= The Lovelock Version =

Novel by Maurice Shadbolt

First edition (publ. Hodder & Stoughton)

The Lovelock Version is a long historical novel by New Zealand writer Maurice Shadbolt that calls into question the interpretation of the past through the narrative process. Published in Auckland and London in 1980 and in New York in 1981, it won the New Zealand Book Award for Fiction and the James Wattie Award.

== Magic realism and history ==
Maurice Shadbolt's novel appeared mid-way through his career and marked a new departure. Until then his fiction had engaged with contemporary New Zealand, although with backward glances as part of the interaction between generations. The Lovelock Version is the first to deal directly with the pioneer years of the 19th century and their aftermath. The Gallipoli Campaign episode, in which sons of his main characters are engaged towards the end of the novel, is later taken up in his play Once on Chunuk Bair (1982). Though the accounts in this later section of Hillary Lovelock's attempted hippy commune on the Porangi River and of Frank Lovelock's withdrawal there to escape police pursuit hark back to Shadbolt's earlier fiction, the Maori Wars episodes near the start of The Lovelock Version were to become the subject of his later trilogy, Season of the Jew (1986), Monday's Warriors (1990) and The House of Strife (1993).

Shadbolt commented on this side of his work that he tried to use native history, tradition, landscape and folklore as active components. In so doing he takes his work out of the sphere of pure historical fiction into the world of Magic realism in a novel indebted in part to Gabriel Marquez's One Hundred Years of Solitude, especially in its sweep over several generations. The novel is no simple glorification of the colonial enterprise but at times becomes a criticism which reflects the author's Left Wing politics.

== Historical and geographical setting ==
The main focus of the novel is on the three Lovelock brothers and their dependents. It begins in South Island, where the Lovelocks have arrived in the 1860s to prospect for gold, but soon moves to North Island, where the brothers settle on the Porangi River to mine coal, fell timber and attempt iron founding. Although the river is fictitious, it is vividly imagined and a clue is given that it is based on the Mokau River, which is 'nearby and has a not dissimilar history'. This appears as one of several literary tricks that Shadbolt plays at the beginning, seemingly quoting from the 'revised' version of The Shell Guide to New Zealand, which Shadbolt had authored earlier (although there is no 1979 revision, as claimed). Also figuring there is a description of the town of Lovelock Junction, where the family settles. They are originally from Devon and so distinct from the family of Jack Lovelock, the best known New Zealander bearing the name, whose father was himself a miner who immigrated from Gloucestershire to South Island at a later date.

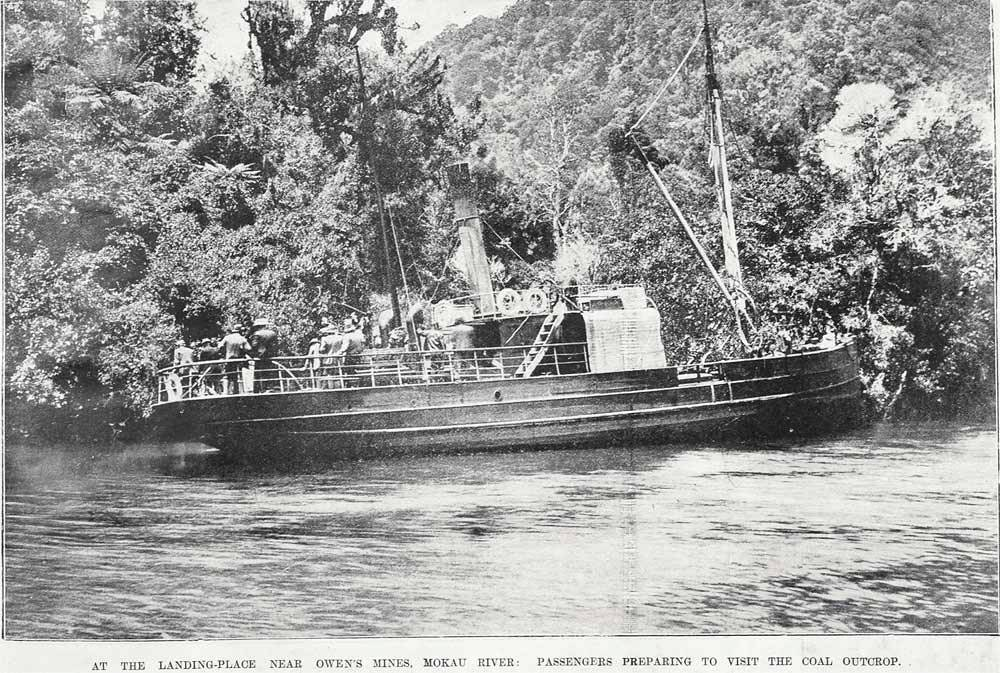
A steamer on the Mokau River, on which the Porangi River and its mines are based

The novel is divided into four sections, the first three of which cover roughly the decades 1860-70 and the next two. The final section is more episodic, covering incidents that involve later family members during the 20th century. The three brothers approach the colonial enterprise with different aspirations. Herman is a Utopian largely insulated from reality; Richard is a compromising capitalist ever watchful for the main chance; James is an idealistic agriculturalist bounded by narrow horizons. It is their womenfolk who are more grounded in reality and interested in relationships, although the persona adopted by the author gives their concerns little sympathy and sees their significance as mainly limited to sexual partnership. Others have observed ‘the predominant focus on male characters in Shadbolt’s fiction’ as a limitation.

The title of the novel seems to be explained by a prefatorial “Author’s Note”, which thanks 'Phillipa Goodyear, of the New Zealand College for Psychic Studies, for her most material help in locating the original Lovelocks’. It suggests that it is they who are his informants, speaking from beyond the grave, setting their story against a spoof piece of scholarship, The Lives of Lovelock Junction, supposedly written by Shadbolt himself. This text is frequently quoted with scorn as a piece of poor psychological speculation that usually gets everything wrong. The succession of authorial metafictional tricks makes it clear that Shadbolt does not believe in official versions, especially of his own country’s history. He suggests instead that history is a combination of personal interpretations, dependent on individual points of view. It is this ironical approach that particularly distinguishes The Lovelock Version from other family chronicles that were appearing in contemporary New Zealand fiction of the period.
