= Kimball Bent =

Soldier and adventurer of New Zealand

Kimble Bent
- Born: Kimball Bent; 24 August 1837; Eastport, Maine, United States
- Died: 22 May 1916 (aged 78); Blenheim, New Zealand
- Burial place: Omaka Cemetery
- Military career
- Allegiance: British Empire
- Branch: British Army
- Service years: 1859–1865
- Rank: Private (rank)
- Unit: 57th (West Middlesex) Regiment of Foot
- Conflicts: Indian Mutiny; New Zealand Wars

Kimball Bent (24 August 1837 – 22 May 1916), also known as Kimble Bent, was a soldier and adventurer, who deserted from the British Army during the New Zealand Wars and lived for several years among the Māori people of New Zealand.

== Biography ==
Bent was born in Eastport, Maine in the United States. He ran away to sea at 17 and spent three years travelling the Atlantic seaboard as a sailor/ gunner in the United States Navy. He returned to Eastport but was restless and sailed to Liverpool, England. Penniless and seeking adventure, on 18 October 1859, he enlisted in the 57th (West Middlesex) Regiment of Foot in the British Army. He served in India and his unit was posted to New Zealand in 1861. His record was dubious, and he was repeatedly disciplined for various military infractions including disobedience and drunkenness. This discipline included a prison sentence in Wellington, and receiving lashes in front of his company. Bent accordingly decided to desert in June 1865 while serving in Taranaki.

Bent was found by a local Māori chief of the Ngāti Ruanui iwi in South Taranaki and eventually became accepted as a part of the local tribe. He fell in with Tītokowaru's followers in 1867 and fought with them against the colonists in what has become known as Tītokowaru's War until their eventual defeat in 1869.

Bent then went into hiding first in the backblocks of Taranaki and later in Wairau, Blenheim. He spent his remaining years working in several trades including as a builder, fisherman, horticulturist, tattooist, traditional healer using Māori medicine and even a confectioner. He remained a wanted deserter with a reward on his head for many years, but eventually the authorities stopped looking for him. In 1903 he was rediscovered, and a book was written about his life by James Cowan. Entitled The adventures of Kimble Bent: a story of wild life in the New Zealand bush, it was something of sensation at the time.

He died in Wairau Hospital on 22 May 1916. and was buried in an unmarked grave in the Omaka Cemetery. The location of his grave in this cemetery is only known to descendants of the family whom he lived with in his final years.

More recently, his tale has been fictionalised by New Zealand author Maurice Shadbolt in his 1990 historical novel Monday's Warriors and in the 2011 graphic novel, Kimble Bent Malcontent: The Wild Adventures of a Runaway Soldier in Old-Time New Zealand by Chris Grosz.
