= Anne Evans =

Anne or Ann Evans may refer to:

- Ann Evans (midwife) (1840–1916), New Zealand nurse
- Anne Evans (poet) (1820–1870), English poet and composer
- Anne Evans (arts patron) (1871–1941), art patron in Colorado
- Anne Evans (soprano) (born 1941), British operatic soprano
- Anne Evans Estabrook, American real estate developer

== See also ==
- Annie Lloyd Evans (1873–1938), Welsh educator
- Mary Ann Evans, writer better known as George Eliot
- Mary Anne Disraeli, née Evans, wife of Disraeli
- Evans (surname)
