= New Zealand Wars =

1845–1872 armed conflicts in New Zealand

New Zealand Wars Ngā pakanga o Aotearoa
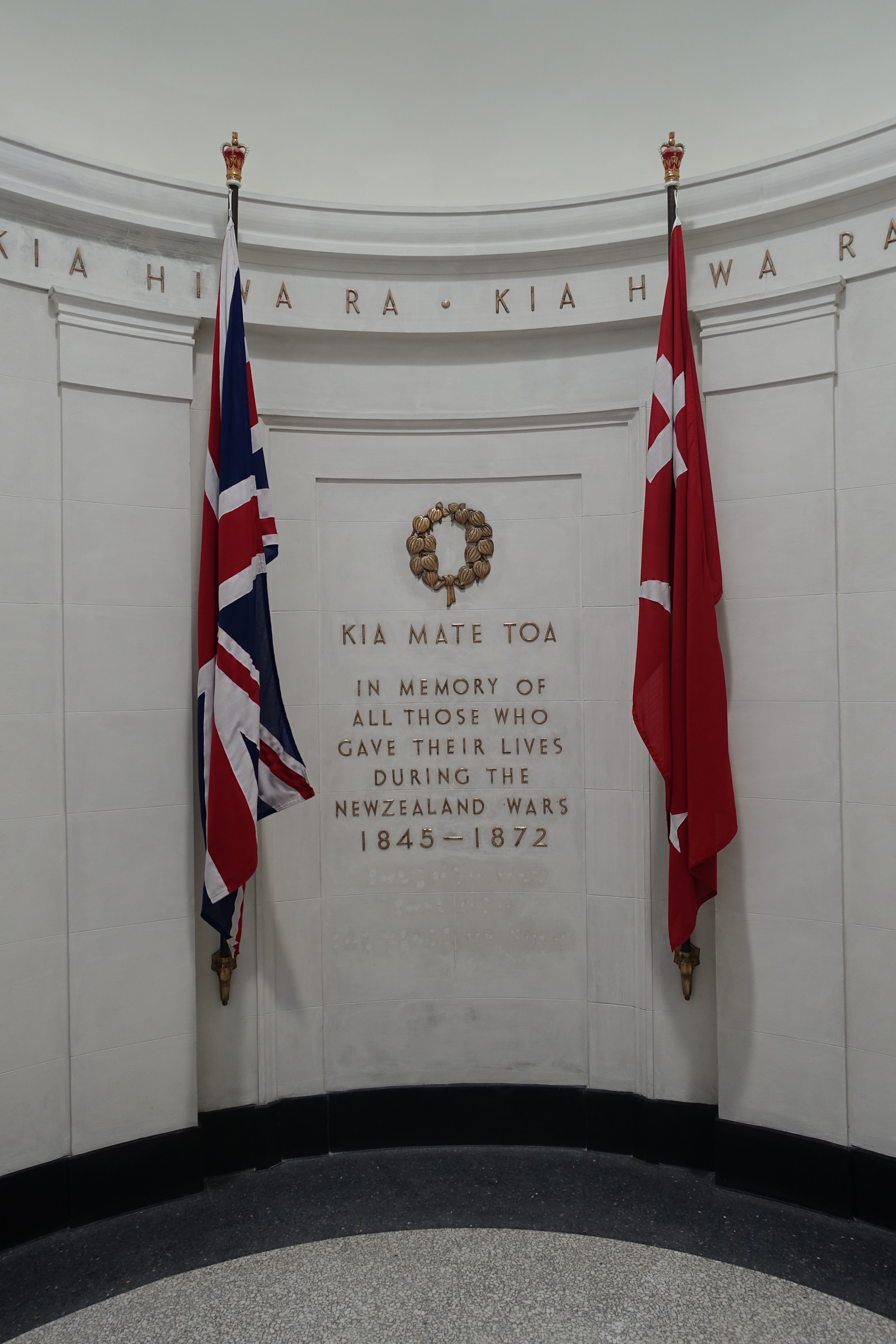
- Memorial in the Auckland War Memorial Museum for all who died in the New Zealand Wars. "Kia mate toa" means to "die bravely", and is the motto of the Otago and Southland Regiment of the New Zealand Army. The flags are the Union Jack and the flag of the Māori defenders of Gate Pā.
Date	1845–1872
Location	New Zealand
Result	Crown victory. Loss of Māori land, the retreat of Kīngitanga to King Country
Territorial changes	New Zealand Settlements Act 1863; confiscation of 16,000 km^{2} (6,200 sq mi) of Māori land

Belligerents
Britain: New Zealand; New South Wales; (Victoria (state)) Victoria; Queensland; Kūpapa Māori iwi	Māori

Strength
18,000 (peak deployment)	5,000 (peak deployment)

Casualties and losses
745 killed (including civilians), 1,014–1,050 wounded	2,154 killed (including civilians), 2,000 wounded

The New Zealand Wars (Māori: ngā pakanga o Aotearoa) took place from 1845 to 1872 between the New Zealand colonial government and allied Māori on one side, and Māori and Māori-allied settlers on the other.

The conflicts did not divide neatly along ethnic lines, as Māori fought on both sides and individuals of European origin also fought alongside Māori forces.

Though the wars were initially localised conflicts triggered by tensions over disputed land purchases (by European settlers from Māori), they escalated dramatically from 1860 as the government became convinced it was facing a united Māori resistance to further land sales and a refusal to acknowledge Crown sovereignty.

Political divisions also existed among people of European descent. Before the establishment of British sovereignty in 1840, New Zealand already contained a small but diverse population of European residents, including traders, whalers, sealers, sailors, missionaries, and migrants from Australia and elsewhere. The interests of the British imperial government, colonial authorities, recently arrived settlers, and some long-established residents did not always coincide. Disputes over land, governance, and the extent of imperial authority contributed to a political environment that was more complex than a simple conflict between "British" and "Māori."

The colonial government summoned thousands of British troops to mount major campaigns to overpower the Kīngitanga (Māori King) movement and also acquire farming and residential land for British settlers. Later campaigns were aimed at quashing the Pai Mārire religious and political movement, which was strongly opposed to the alienation of Māori land and eager to strengthen Māori identity. Māori religious movements that promoted pan-Māori identity played a major role in the wars.

At the peak of hostilities in the 1860s, 18,000 British Army troops, supported by artillery, cavalry and local militia, battled about 4,000 Māori warriors in what became a gross imbalance of manpower and weaponry. Although outnumbered, the Māori were able to withstand their enemy with techniques that included anti-artillery bunkers and the use of carefully placed pā (fortified villages) that allowed them to block their enemy's advance and often inflict heavy losses, yet quickly abandon their positions without significant loss. Guerrilla-style tactics were used by both sides in later campaigns, often fought in dense bush. Over the course of the Taranaki and Waikato campaigns, the lives of about 1,800 Māori and 800 Europeans were lost, and total Māori losses over the course of all the wars may have exceeded 2,100.

Violence over land ownership broke out first in the Wairau Valley in the South Island in June 1843, but rising tensions in Taranaki eventually led to the involvement of British military forces at Waitara in March 1860. The war between the government and Kīngitanga Māori spread to other areas of the North Island, with the biggest single campaign being the invasion of the Waikato in 1863–1864, before hostilities concluded with the pursuits of Riwha Tītokowaru in Taranaki (1868–1869) and rangatira (chief) Te Kooti Arikirangi Te Turuki on the east coast (1868–1872).

Although Māori were initially fought by British Army forces, the New Zealand government developed its own military force, including local militia, rifle volunteer groups, the specialist Forest Rangers and kūpapa (pro-government Māori). As part of broader Australian involvement in the wars, the Colony of Victoria deployed its naval forces, and at least 2,500 volunteers formed contingents that crossed the Tasman Sea and integrated with the New Zealand militia. The government also responded with legislation to imprison Māori opponents and confiscate expansive areas of the North Island for sale to settlers, with the funds used to cover war expenses, punitive measures that on the east and west coasts provoked an intensification of Māori resistance and aggression.

== Name ==
The New Zealand Wars were previously referred to as the Land Wars or the Māori Wars, and an earlier Māori-language name for the conflict was te riri Pākehā ("the white man's anger"). Historian James Belich popularised the name "New Zealand Wars" in the 1980s, although according to Vincent O'Malley, the term was first used by historian James Cowan in the 1920s.

== Background ==
The 1840 English language version of the Treaty of Waitangi guaranteed that individual Māori iwi (tribes) should have undisturbed possession of their lands, and property taonga (Māori for 'treasures') in return for becoming British subjects, selling land to the government only (the right of pre-emption) and surrendering sovereignty to the British Crown. In the Māori language version of the Treaty, however, the word "sovereignty" was translated as kawanatanga which was a new word meaning "governance". This led to considerable disagreement over the meaning of the Treaty. Some Māori wanted to sign to consolidate peace and in hopes of ending the long intertribal Musket Wars (1807–1845) others wanted to keep their tino rangatiratanga, such as Tūhoe in Te Urewera.

All pre-treaty colonial land-sale deals had taken place directly between two parties. In the early period of contact, Māori had generally sought trade with Europeans. The British and the French had established mission stations, and missionaries had received land from iwi for houses, schools, churches, and farms.

Traders, Sydney businessmen and the New Zealand Company had bought large tracts of land before 1840. The Treaty of Waitangi included the right of Crown pre-emption on land sales, and the New Zealand colonial government, pressured by immigrant European settlers, tried to speed up land sales to provide farmland. This met resistance from the Kīngitanga (Māori King) movement that emerged in the 1850s and opposed further European encroachment.

Governor Thomas Gore Browne's provocative purchase of a disputed block of land at Waitara in 1859 set the government on a collision course with the Kīngitanga movement, and the government interpreted the Kīngitanga response as a challenge to the Crown's authority. Governor Gore Browne succeeded in bringing 3,500 Imperial troops from the Australian colonies to quash this perceived challenge, and within four years a total of 9,000 British troops had arrived in New Zealand, assisted by more than 4,000 colonial and kūpapa (pro-government Māori) fighters as the government sought a decisive victory over the "rebel" Māori.

The use of a punitive land confiscation policy from 1865, depriving "rebel" Māori of the means of living, fuelled further Māori anger and resentment, fanning the flames of conflict in Taranaki (1863–1866) and on the east coast (1865–1866).

== History ==
=== Conflicts ===
The various conflicts of the New Zealand wars span a considerable period, and the causes and outcomes differ widely. The earliest conflicts in the 1840s happened at a time when Māori were still the predominant power, but by the 1860s settler numbers and resources were much greater. From about 1862 British troops began arriving in much greater number, summoned by Governor George Grey for his Waikato invasion, and in March 1864 total troop numbers peaked at about 14,000 (9,000 Imperial troops, more than 4,000 colonial and a few hundred kūpapa).

==== Wairau Affray ====
The first armed conflict between Māori and the European settlers took place on 17 June 1843 in the Wairau Valley, in the north of the South Island. The clash was sparked when settlers led by a representative of the New Zealand Company—which held a false title deed to a block of land—attempted to clear Māori off the land ready for surveying. The party also attempted to arrest Ngāti Toa chiefs Te Rauparaha and Te Rangihaeata. Fighting broke out and 22 Europeans were killed, as well as four to six Māori. Nine of the Europeans were slain after being captured. In early 1844, the new governor, Robert FitzRoy, investigated the incident and declared the settlers were at fault. The Wairau Affray—described as the Wairau Massacre in early texts—was the only armed conflict of the New Zealand Wars to take place in the South Island.

==== Northern War ====
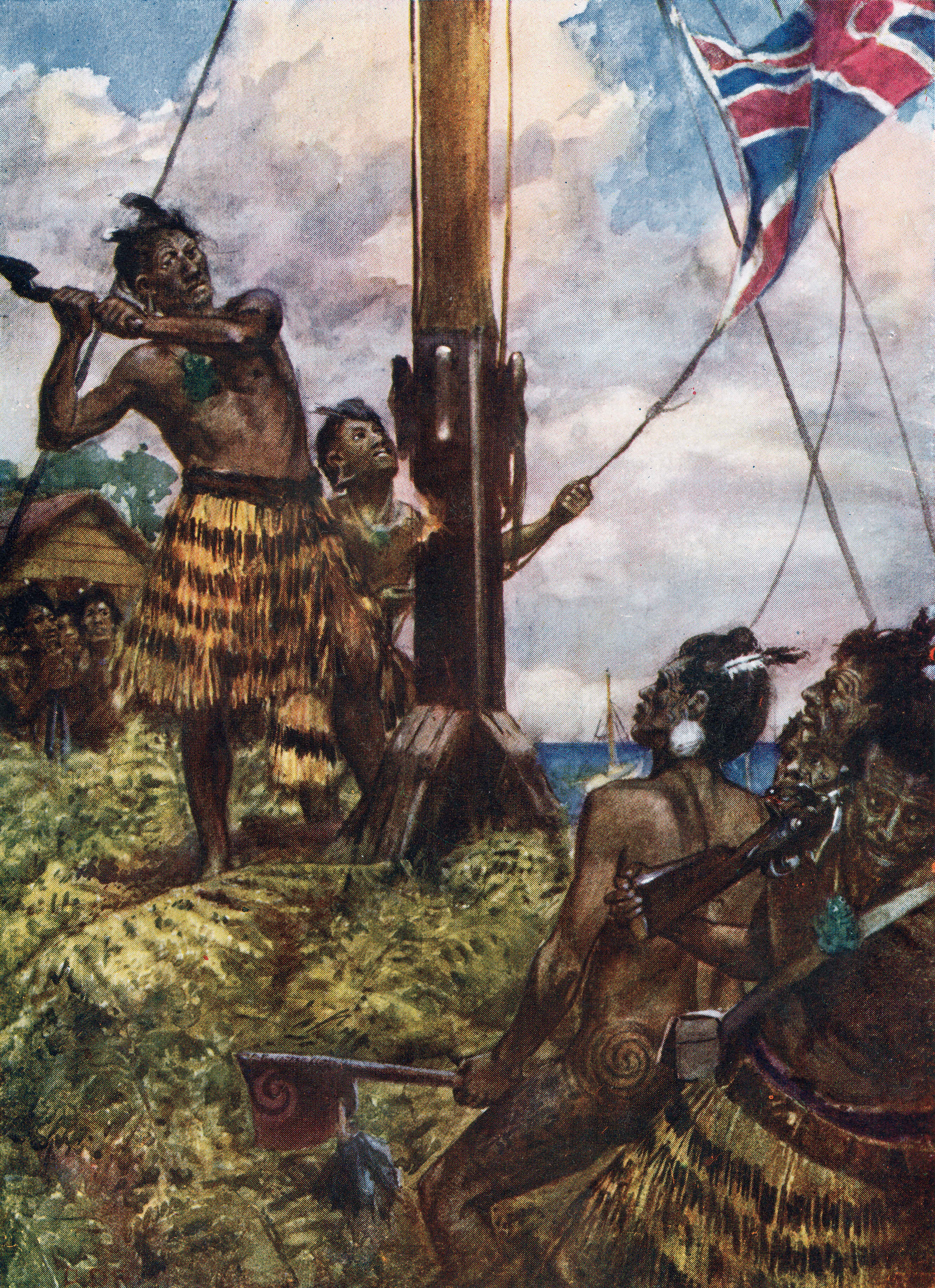
Hōne Heke cuts down the flagstaff on Flagstaff Hill at Kororāreka.

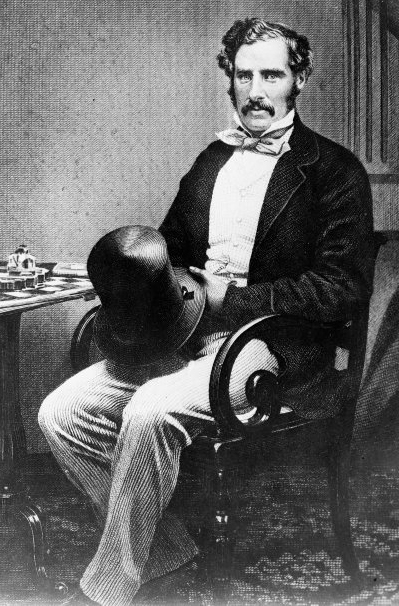
Governor (and later Premier) Sir George Grey in the 1860s.

The Flagstaff War took place in the far north of New Zealand, around the Bay of Islands, between March 1845 and January 1846, and was the first major conflict between the British and Māori people. In 1845 George Grey arrived in New Zealand to take up his appointment as governor. At this time Hōne Heke challenged the authority of the British, beginning by cutting down the flagstaff on Flagstaff Hill at Kororāreka. The flagstaff had previously flown the colours of United Tribes of New Zealand but now carried the Union Jack and therefore symbolised the grievances of Heke and his ally Te Ruki Kawiti, as to changes that had followed the signing of the Treaty of Waitangi.

There were many causes of the Flagstaff War and Heke had a number of grievances in relation to the Treaty of Waitangi. While land acquisition by the Church Missionary Society (CMS) had been controversial, the rebellion led by Heke was directed against the colonial forces with the CMS missionaries trying to persuade Heke to end the fighting. Despite the fact that Tāmati Wāka Nene and most of Ngāpuhi sided with the government, the small and ineptly led British force had been beaten at the Battle of Ōhaeawai. Grey, with the financial support and far more troops armed with 32-pounder cannons that had been denied to FitzRoy, attacked and occupied Kawiti's fortress at Ruapekapeka, forcing Kawiti to retreat. Heke's confidence waned after he was wounded in battle with Tāmati Wāka Nene and his warriors, and by the realisation that the British had far more resources than he could muster, including some Pākehā Māori, who supported the colonial forces.

After the Battle of Ruapekapeka, Heke and Kawiti were ready for peace. They approached Tāmati Wāka Nene to act as the intermediary to negotiate with Governor Grey, who accepted the advice of Nene that Heke and Kawiti should not be punished for their rebellion. The fighting in the north ended and there was no punitive confiscation of Ngāpuhi land.

==== Hutt Valley and Wanganui campaigns ====
The Hutt Valley campaign of 1846 came as a sequel to the Wairau Affray. The causes were similar—dubious land purchases by the New Zealand Company and the desire of the settlers to move on to land before disputes over titles were resolved—and the two conflicts shared many of the same protagonists. The campaign's most notable clashes were the Māori dawn raid on an imperial stockade at Boulcott's Farm on 16 May 1846 in which eight British soldiers and an estimated two Māori died, and the Battle of Battle Hill from 6–13 August as British troops, local militia and kūpapa pursued a Ngāti Toa force led by chief Te Rangihaeata through steep and dense bushland. Ngāti Toa chief Te Rauparaha was also taken into custody during the campaign; he was detained without charge in Auckland for two years.

The bloodshed heightened settlers' fears in nearby Wanganui, which was given a strong military force to guard against attack. In April 1847 an accidental shooting of a minor Wanganui Māori chief led to a bloody revenge attack on a settler family; when the perpetrators were captured and hanged, a major raid was launched on the town as a reprisal, with homes plundered and burned and livestock stolen. The Māori besieged the town before mounting a frontal attack in July 1847. A peace settlement was reached in early 1848.

==== First Taranaki War ====
The catalyst for the First Taranaki War was the disputed sale to the Crown of a 240 hectare block of land at Waitara, despite a veto by the paramount chief of Te Āti Awa tribe, Wiremu Kīngi Te Rangitāke, and a "solemn contract" by local Māori not to sell. Governor Browne accepted the purchase with full knowledge of the circumstances and tried to occupy the land, anticipating it would lead to armed conflict, and a demonstration of the substantive sovereignty the British believed they had gained in the Treaty of Waitangi. Hostilities began on 17 March 1860.

The war was fought by more than 3,500 imperial troops brought in from Australia, as well as volunteer soldiers and militia, against Māori forces that fluctuated between a few hundred and about 1,500. In response to a call from Governor Browne for reinforcements, the Victorian Government sent its first and only warship, HMVS Victoria, to supply men and perform shore bombardments and coastal patrols, while maintaining supply routes between ports. Sailors from the crew served ashore in combat, and in August 1860, the Victoria rescued 100 civilians from the besieged town of New Plymouth. The ship's service in the First Taranaki War marks the first time an Australian military unit committed to active service overseas, and is today recognised by the Royal Australian Navy as its earliest battle honour.

After a series of battles and actions the war ended in a ceasefire, with neither side explicitly accepting the peace terms of the other. Total losses among the imperial, volunteer and militia troops are estimated to have been 238, while Māori casualties totalled about 200. Though there were claims by the British that they had won the war, there were widely held views at the time they had suffered an unfavourable and humiliating result. Historians have also been divided on the result. Historian James Belich has claimed that Māori succeeded in thwarting the British bid to impose sovereignty over them, and had therefore been victorious. Belich also states that the Māori victory was a hollow one, leading to the invasion of the Waikato.

==== Invasion of the Waikato ====
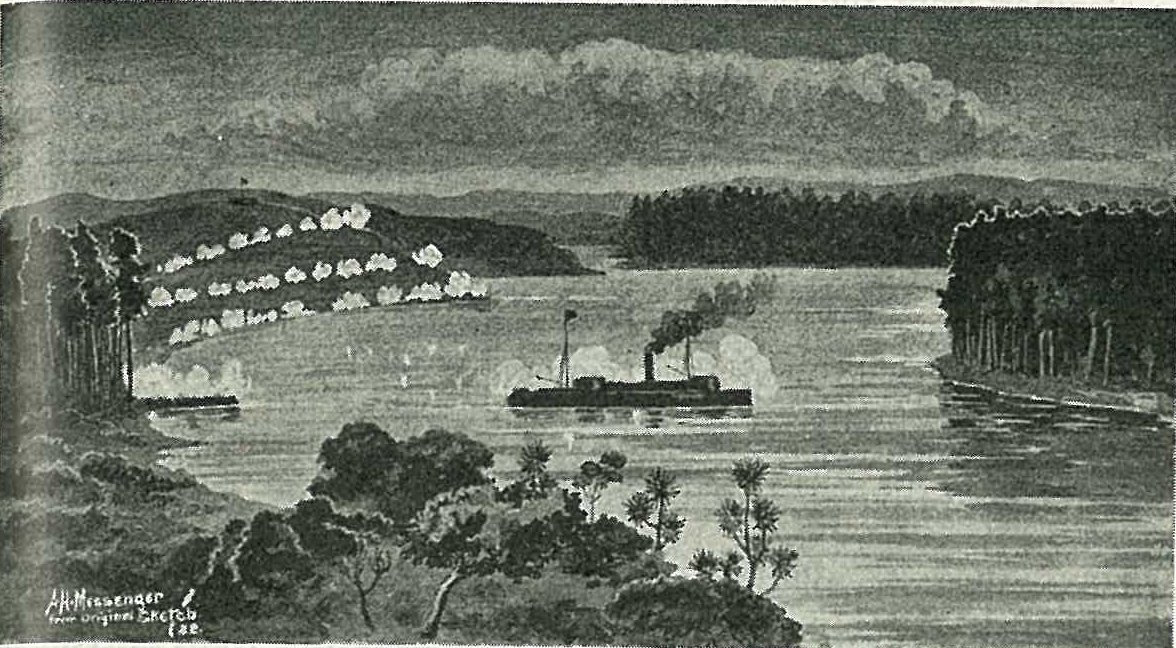
The gunboat Pioneer at Meremere during the Invasion of the Waikato.

Browne began making arrangements for a Waikato campaign to destroy the Kīngitanga stronghold at the close of the First Taranaki War. Preparations were suspended in December 1861 when he was replaced by Sir George Grey, but Grey revived plans for an invasion in June 1863. He persuaded the Colonial Office in London to send more than 10,000 Imperial troops to New Zealand and General Sir Duncan Cameron was appointed to lead the campaign. Cameron used soldiers to build the 18 km-long Great South Road to the border of Kīngitanga territory and on 9 July 1863 Grey ordered all Māori living between Auckland and the Waikato take an oath of allegiance to Queen Victoria or be expelled south of the Waikato River; when his ultimatum was rejected the vanguard of the army crossed the frontier into Kīngitanga territory and established a forward camp. A long series of bush raids on his supply lines forced Cameron to build an extensive network of forts and redoubts through the area. In a continual buildup of force, Cameron eventually had 14,000 British and colonial soldiers at his disposal, including 2,500 volunteers from Australia who were integrated into the 1st, 2nd, 3rd, and 4th Waikato militia regiments; as well as steamers and armoured vessels for use on the Waikato River. They fought a combined Māori contingent of about 4,000.

Cameron and his Kīngitanga foe engaged in several major battles including the Battle of Rangiriri and a three-day siege at Orakau, capturing the Kīngitanga capital of Ngāruawāhia in December 1863, before completing their Waikato conquest in April 1864. The Waikato campaign cost the lives of 700 British and colonial soldiers and about 1,000 Māori.

The Kīngitanga Māori retreated into the rugged interior of the North Island and in 1865 the New Zealand Government confiscated about 12,000 km^{2} of Māori land (4% of New Zealand's land area) for white settlement—an action that quickly provoked the Second Taranaki War.

==== Tauranga campaign ====
The six-month long Tauranga campaign of 1864 was initially launched by Cameron to disrupt Māori supply lines and secure the Bay of Plenty for European settlement. It was marked by strategic maneuvering and intense battles between British Imperial forces and local Māori tribes, primarily Ngāi Te Rangi. The campaign faced internal political divisions early on with Premier Frederick Whitaker supporting an aggressive approach, while Governor Grey advocated a defensive stance to prevent wider rebellion. The conflict culminated in the Battle of Gate Pā in April, where Māori defenders, under the leadership of Rawiri Puhirake, successfully repelled a British assault, inflicting significant casualties and earning a reputation as a humiliating defeat for the British.

Following the setback, efforts to negotiate peace intensified, with Governor Grey seeking to limit land confiscations and reduce Māori resistance, leading to a temporary cessation of hostilities. However, in June, Māori forces, reinforced and commanded by Hoera te Mataatai, chose to engage the British again at Te Ranga. In a decisive battle, the British forces, led by Brigadier George Carey, overcame Māori entrenchments, resulting in substantial casualties on both sides. The Tauranga campaign concluded with the surrender of Ngāi Te Rangi warriors, marking a turning point in the New Zealand Wars and shaping subsequent negotiations between Māori and the colonial government.

==== Second Taranaki War ====
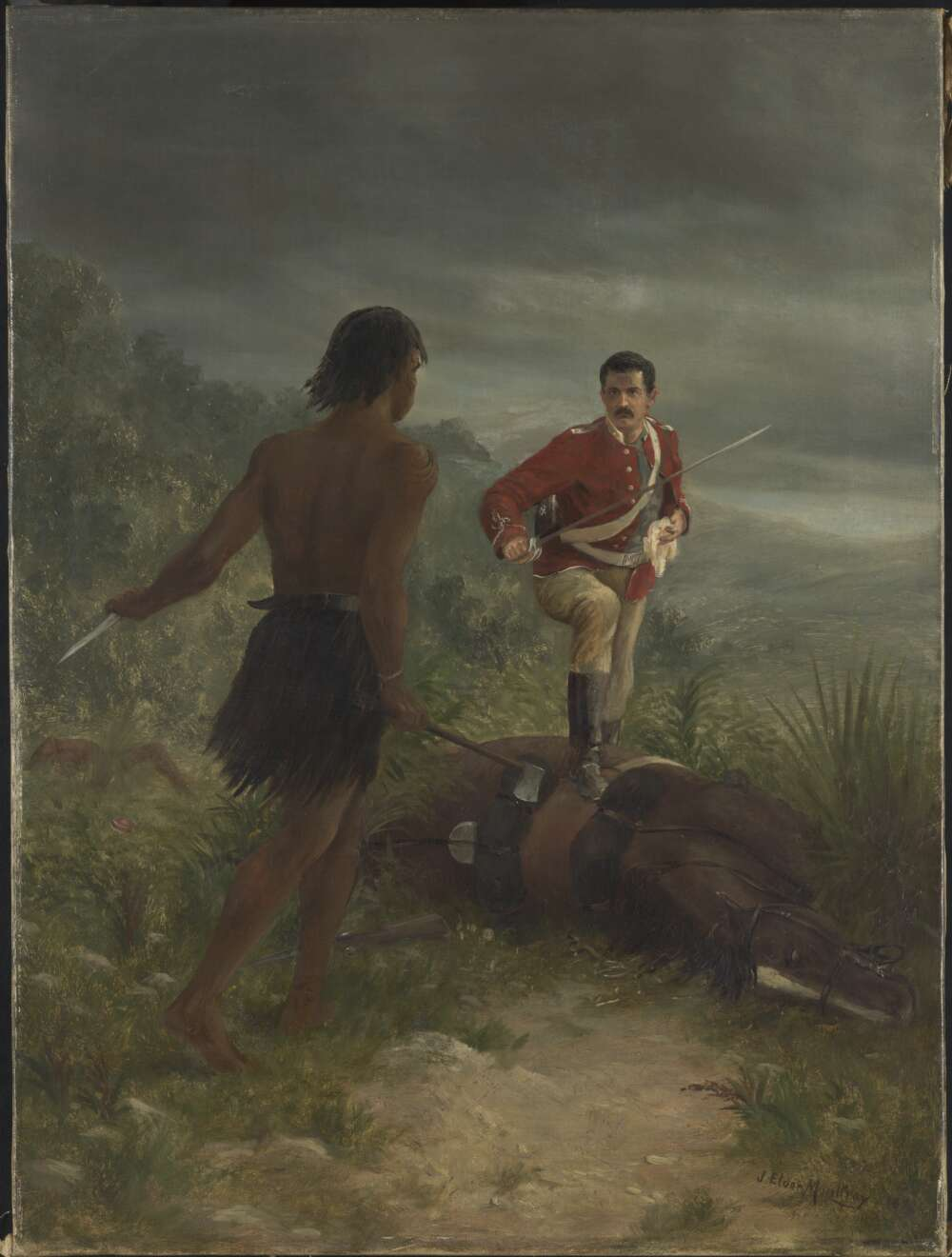
John Moultray's A Trooper of the Wanganui Cavalry Attacked by a Hau-Hau, an oil on canvas executed in 1892

Between 1863 and 1866 there was a resumption of hostilities between Māori and the New Zealand Government in Taranaki, which is sometimes referred to as the Second Taranaki War. The conflict, which overlapped the wars in Waikato and Tauranga, was fuelled by a combination of factors: lingering Māori resentment over the sale of land at Waitara in 1860 and government delays in resolving the issue; a large-scale land confiscation policy launched by the government in late 1863; and the rise of the so-called Hauhau movement, an extremist part of the Pai Marire syncretic religion, which was strongly opposed to the alienation of Māori land and eager to strengthen Māori identity. The Hauhau movement became a unifying factor for Taranaki Māori in the absence of individual Māori commanders.

The style of warfare after 1863 differed markedly from that of the 1860–1861 conflict, in which Māori had taken set positions and challenged the army to an open contest. From 1863, the army, working with greater numbers of troops and heavy artillery, systematically took possession of Māori land by driving off the inhabitants, adopting a "scorched earth" strategy of laying waste to Māori villages and cultivations, with attacks on villages, whether warlike or otherwise. Historian Brian Dalton noted: "The aim was no longer to conquer territory, but to inflict the utmost 'punishment' on the enemy; inevitably there was a great deal of brutality, much burning of undefended villages and indiscriminate looting, in which loyal Maoris often suffered." As the troops advanced, the Government built an expanding line of redoubts, behind which settlers built homes and developed farms. The effect was a creeping confiscation of almost 4,000 km^{2} (1,500 sq mi) of land, with little distinction between the land of loyal or rebel Māori owners. The outcome of the armed conflict in Taranaki between 1860 and 1869 was a series of enforced confiscations of Taranaki tribal land from Māori blanketed as being in rebellion against the Government.

==== East Cape War ====
East coast hostilities erupted in April 1865 and, as in the Second Taranaki War, sprang from Māori resentment of punitive government land confiscations coupled with the embrace of radical Pai Marire expression. The religion arrived on the east coast from Taranaki in early 1865. The subsequent ritual killing of missionary Carl Volkner by Pai Mārire (or Hauhau) followers at Ōpōtiki on 2 March 1865 sparked settler fears of an outbreak of violence and later that year the New Zealand government launched a lengthy expedition to hunt for Volkner's killers and neutralise the movement's influence. Rising tensions between Pai Mārire followers and conservative Māori led to a number of wars between and within Māori iwi, with kūpapa armed by the government in a bid to exterminate the movement.

Major conflicts within the campaign included the cavalry and artillery attack on Te Tarata pā near Ōpōtiki in October 1865 in which about 35 Māori were killed, and the seven-day siege of Waerenga-a-Hika in November 1865. The government confiscated northern parts of Urewera land in January 1866 in a bid to break down supposed Māori support for Volkner's killers and confiscated additional land in Hawke's Bay a year later after a rout of a Māori party it deemed a threat to the settlement of Napier.

==== Tītokowaru's War ====
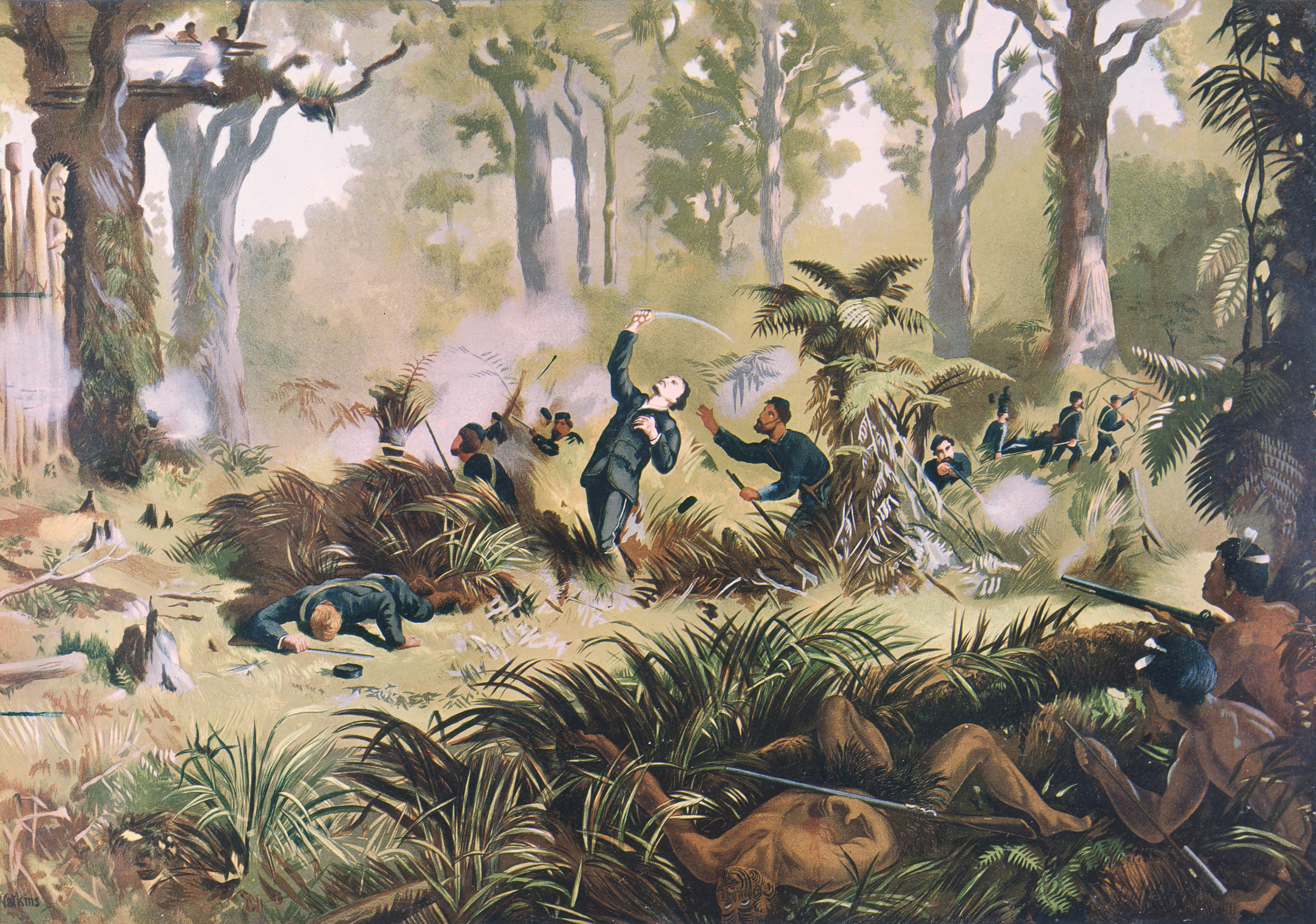
The Armed Constabulary ambushed by Tītokowaru's forces at Te Ngutu o Te Manu

War flared again in Taranaki in June 1868 as Riwha Tītokowaru, chief of Ngāruahine, responded to the continued surveying and settlement of confiscated land with well-planned and effective attacks on settlers and government troops in an effort to block the occupation of Māori land. Coinciding with a violent raid on a European settlement on the East Coast by Te Kooti, the attacks shattered what European colonists regarded as a new era of peace and prosperity, creating fears of a "general uprising of hostile Māoris".

Tītokowaru, who had fought in the Second Taranaki War, was the most skilful West Coast Māori warrior. He also assumed the roles of a priest and prophet of the extremist Hauhau movement of the Pai Mārire religion, reviving ancient rites of cannibalism and propitiation of Māori gods with the human heart torn from the first slain in a battle. Although Tītokowaru's forces were numerically small and initially outnumbered in battle twelve to one by government troops, the ferocity of their attacks provoked fear among settlers and prompted the resignation and desertion of many militia volunteers, ultimately leading to the withdrawal of most government military forces from South Taranaki and giving Tītokowaru control of almost all territory between New Plymouth and Wanganui. Although Tītokowaru provided the strategy and leadership that had been missing among tribes that had fought in the Second Taranaki War and his forces never lost a battle during their intensive campaign, they mysteriously abandoned a strong position at Tauranga-ika Pā and Tītokowaru's army immediately began to disperse. Kimble Bent, who lived as a slave with Tītokowaru's hapū after deserting from the 57th Regiment, told Cowan 50 years later the chief had lost his mana tapu, or sacred power, after committing adultery with the wife of another chief.

Once Tītokowaru was defeated and the East Coast threat minimised, the alienation of Māori land, as well as the political subjugation of Māori, continued at an even more rapid pace.

==== Te Kooti's War ====
Te Kooti's War was fought in the East Coast region and across the heavily forested central North Island and Bay of Plenty between government military forces and followers of spiritual leader Te Kooti Arikirangi Te Turuki. The conflict was sparked by Te Kooti's return to New Zealand after two years of internment on the Chatham Islands, from where he had escaped with almost 200 Māori prisoners of war and their families. Te Kooti, who had been held without trial on the island for two years, asked that he and his followers be left in peace, but within two weeks they were being pursued by a force of militia, government troops and Māori volunteers. The pursuit turned into a four-year guerrilla war, involving more than 30 expeditions by colonial and Māori troops against Te Kooti's dwindling number of warriors.

Although initially fighting defensively against pursuing government forces, Te Kooti went on the offensive from November 1868, starting with the so-called Poverty Bay massacre, a well-organised lightning strike against selected European settlers and Māori opponents in the Matawhero district, in which 51 men, women and children were slaughtered and their homes set alight. The attack prompted another vigorous pursuit by government forces, which included a siege at Ngatapa pā that came to a bloody end: although Te Kooti escaped the siege, Māori forces loyal to the government caught and executed more than 130 of his supporters, as well as prisoners he had earlier seized. Dissatisfied with the Māori King Movement's reluctance to continue its fight against European invasion and confiscation, Te Kooti offered Māori an Old Testament vision of salvation from oppression and a return to a promised land. Wounded three times in battle, he gained a reputation for being immune to death and uttered prophecies that had the appearance of being fulfilled.

In early 1870 Te Kooti gained refuge from Tūhoe tribes, which consequently suffered a series of damaging raids in which crops and villages were destroyed, after other Māori iwi were lured by the promise of a £5,000 reward for Te Kooti's capture. Te Kooti was finally granted sanctuary by the Māori king in 1872 and moved to the King Country, where he continued to develop rituals, texts and prayers of his Ringatū faith. He was formally pardoned by the government in February 1883 and died in 1893.

A 2013 Waitangi Tribunal report said the action of Crown forces on the East Coast from 1865 to 1869—the East Coast Wars and the start of Te Kooti's War—resulted in the deaths of proportionately more Māori than in any other district during the New Zealand wars. It condemned the "illegal imprisonment" on the Chatham Islands of a quarter of the East Coast region's adult male population and said the loss in war of an estimated 43 percent of the male population, many through acts of "lawless brutality", was a stain on New Zealand's history and character.

== Participants ==
The New Zealand campaigns involved Māori warriors from a range of iwi, most of which were allied with the Kīngitanga movement, fighting a mix of Imperial troops, local militia groups, the specialist Forest Rangers and kūpapa, or "loyalist" Māori.

=== Imperial ===
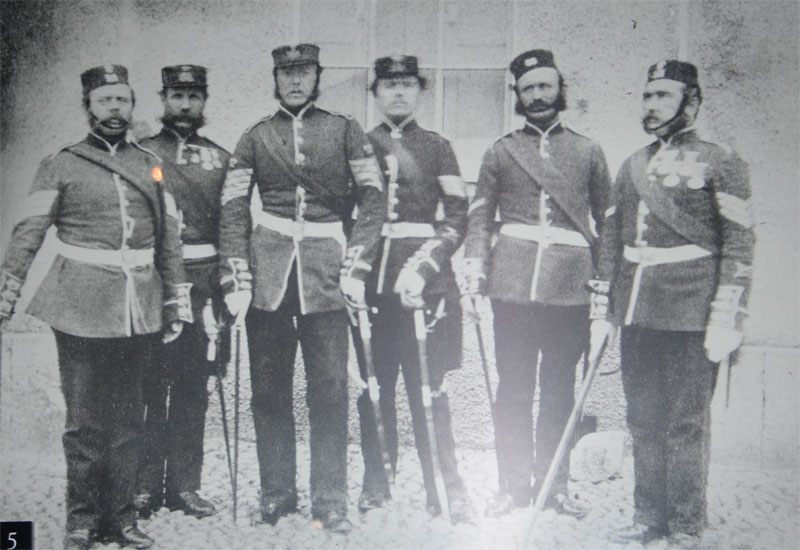
NCOs of the 58th Regiment of the Foot in New Zealand, date unknown.

In 1855 just 1,250 Imperial troops, from two under-strength British regiments, were in New Zealand. Although both were scheduled to depart at the end of the year, Browne succeeded in retaining one of them for use in New Plymouth, where settlers feared the spread of intertribal violence. At the outbreak of Taranaki hostilities in 1860, reinforcements were brought from Auckland to boost the New Plymouth garrison, raising the total force of regulars to 450 and for many months the total number of Māori under arms exceeded the number of troops in Taranaki. In mid-April the arrival of three warships and about 400 soldiers from Australia marked the beginning of the escalation of imperial troop numbers.

The buildup increased rapidly under Grey's term as governor: when the second round of hostilities broke out in Taranaki in May 1863 he applied to the Secretary of State in London for the immediate dispatch of three more regiments and also wrote to the Australian governors asking for whatever British troops that could be made available. Lieutenant-General Duncan Cameron, the Commander-in-Chief of the British troops in New Zealand, began the Waikato invasion in July with fewer than 4,000 effective troops in Auckland at his disposal, but the continuous arrival of regiments from overseas rapidly swelled the force.

==== Imperial regiments and units stationed in New Zealand ====
British infantry regiments stationed in New Zealand during the New Zealand Wars were:

Regiment	Years in New Zealand	Conflicts
12th (East Suffolk) Regiment of Foot	1860–1867	First Taranaki War, Invasion of the Waikato, Tauranga Campaign
14th (Buckinghamshire) Regiment of Foot	1860–1866	First Taranaki War, Invasion of the Waikato, Tauranga Campaign, Tītokowaru's War
18th (Royal Irish) Regiment of Foot	1863–1870	Invasion of the Waikato, Tītokowaru's War
40th (2nd Somersetshire) Regiment of Foot	1860–1866	First Taranaki War, Invasion of the Waikato,
43rd (Monmouthshire) Light Infantry	1863–1866	Invasion of the Waikato, Tauranga Campaign, Second Taranaki War
50th (Queens Own) Regiment of Foot	1863–1867	Invasion of the Waikato, Tītokowaru's War
57th (West Middlesex) Regiment of Foot	1861–1867	First Taranaki War, Second Taranaki War, Tītokowaru's War
58th (Rutlandshire) Regiment of Foot	1845–1858	Flagstaff War, Hutt Valley Campaign
65th (Yorkshire North Riding) Regiment of Foot	1846–1865	Hutt Valley Campaign, Wanganui Campaign, First Taranaki War, Invasion of the Waikato
68th (Durham) Light Infantry	1864–1866	Invasion of the Waikato, Tauranga Campaign, Tītokowaru's War
70th (Surrey) Regiment of Foot	1861–1866	First Taranaki War, Invasion of the Waikato, Second Taranaki War
80th (South Staffordshire) Regiment of Foot	1840–1846	
96th Regiment of Foot	1841–1845	Flagstaff War, Hutt Valley Campaign
99th (Lanarkshire) Regiment of Foot	1844–1847	Flagstaff War, Hutt Valley Campaign
Royal Artillery	1845–1870	Flagstaff War, Hutt Valley Campaign, Wanganui Campaign, First Taranaki War, Invasion of the Waikato, Tauranga Campaign, Second Taranaki War, Titokowaru's War
Corps of Royal Engineers	1840–1870	Flagstaff War, Hutt Valley Campaign, Wanganui Campaign, First Taranaki War, Invasion of the Waikato, Tauranga Campaign, Second Taranaki War, Titokowaru's War
Royal Corps of Sappers and Miners	1845–1870	Flagstaff War, Hutt Valley Campaign, Wanganui Campaign
Army Medical Department	1860–1870	First Taranaki War, Invasion of the Waikato, Tauranga Campaign, Second Taranaki War, Titokowaru's War
Army Hospital Corps	1861–1870	First Taranaki War, Invasion of the Waikato, Tauranga Campaign, Second Taranaki War, Titokowaru's War
Purveyors Department	1860–1870	First Taranaki War, Invasion of the Waikato, Tauranga Campaign, Second Taranaki War, Titokowaru's War
Commissariat Staff Corps	1861–1870	First Taranaki War, Invasion of the Waikato, Tauranga Campaign, Second Taranaki War, Titokowaru's War
Military Train and Horse Transport Corps	1861–1867	Invasion of the Waikato, Tauranga Campaign, Second Taranaki War, Titokowaru's War
Ordnance Department	1845–1859	Flagstaff War, Hutt Valley Campaign Wanganui Campaign,
Military Store Department	1859–1870	First Taranaki War, Invasion of the Waikato, Tauranga Campaign, Second Taranaki War East Cape War, Titokowaru's War
Royal Marines	1845–1866	Flagstaff War, Hutt Valley Campaign Wanganui Campaign, First Taranaki War, Invasion of the Waikato, Tauranga Campaign
Naval brigade	1845–1866	Flagstaff War, Hutt Valley Campaign Wanganui Campaign, First Taranaki War, Invasion of the Waikato, Tauranga Campaign

=== Colonial Defence Force ===
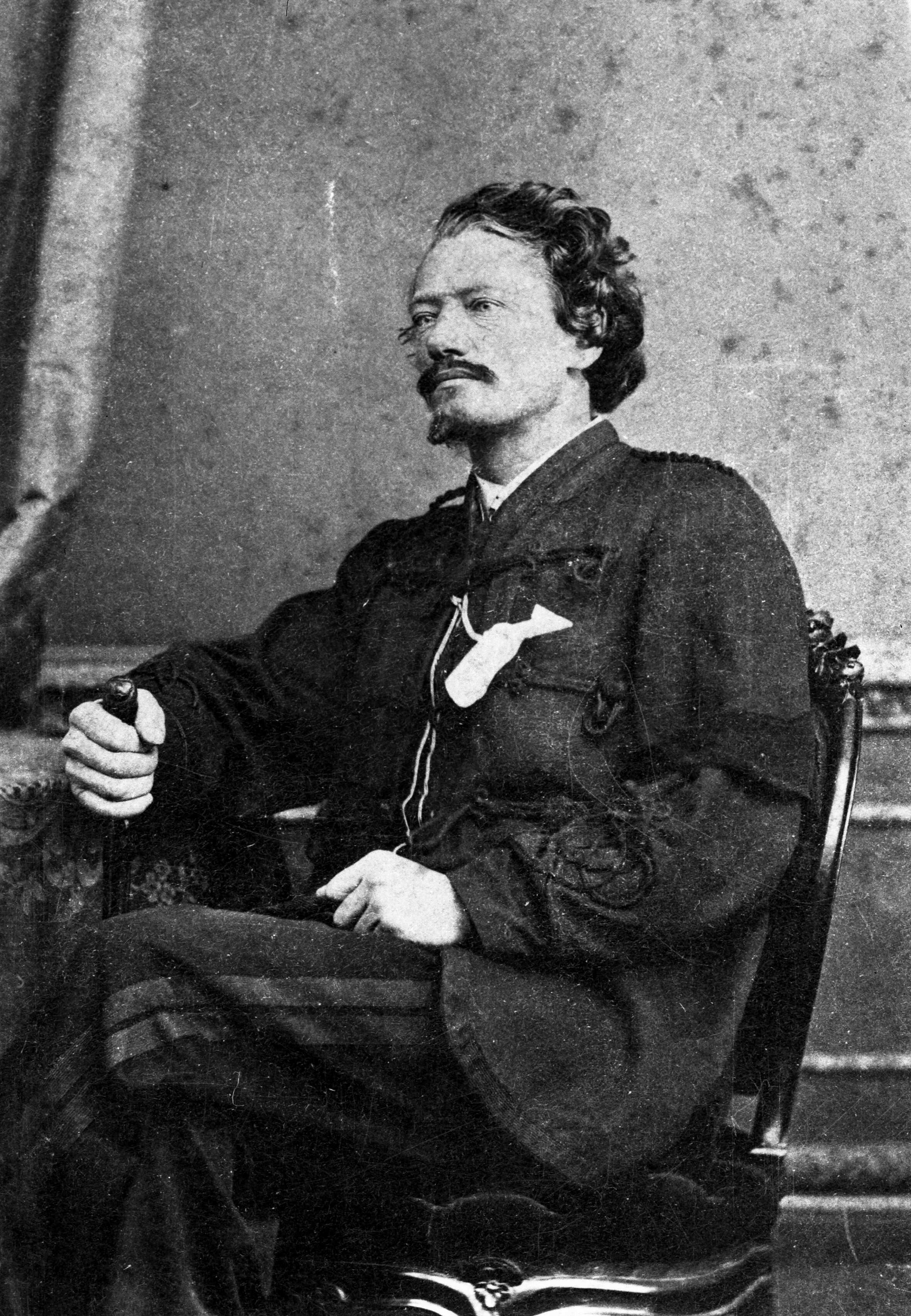
Gustavus Von Tempsky, captain of the Forest Rangers.

The Colonial Defence Force, a cavalry unit of about 100 men, was formed by Colonel Marmaduke Nixon in May 1863 and served in Waikato and militia forces were also used throughout the New Zealand wars. The Militia Ordinance 1845 provided for the compulsory training or service within 40 km of their town by all able-bodied European men aged between 18 and 60; the Auckland Militia and Volunteers reached a peak of about 1650 on active service in the early stages of the Waikato campaign; and the last force—the Taranaki Militia—was released from service in 1872.

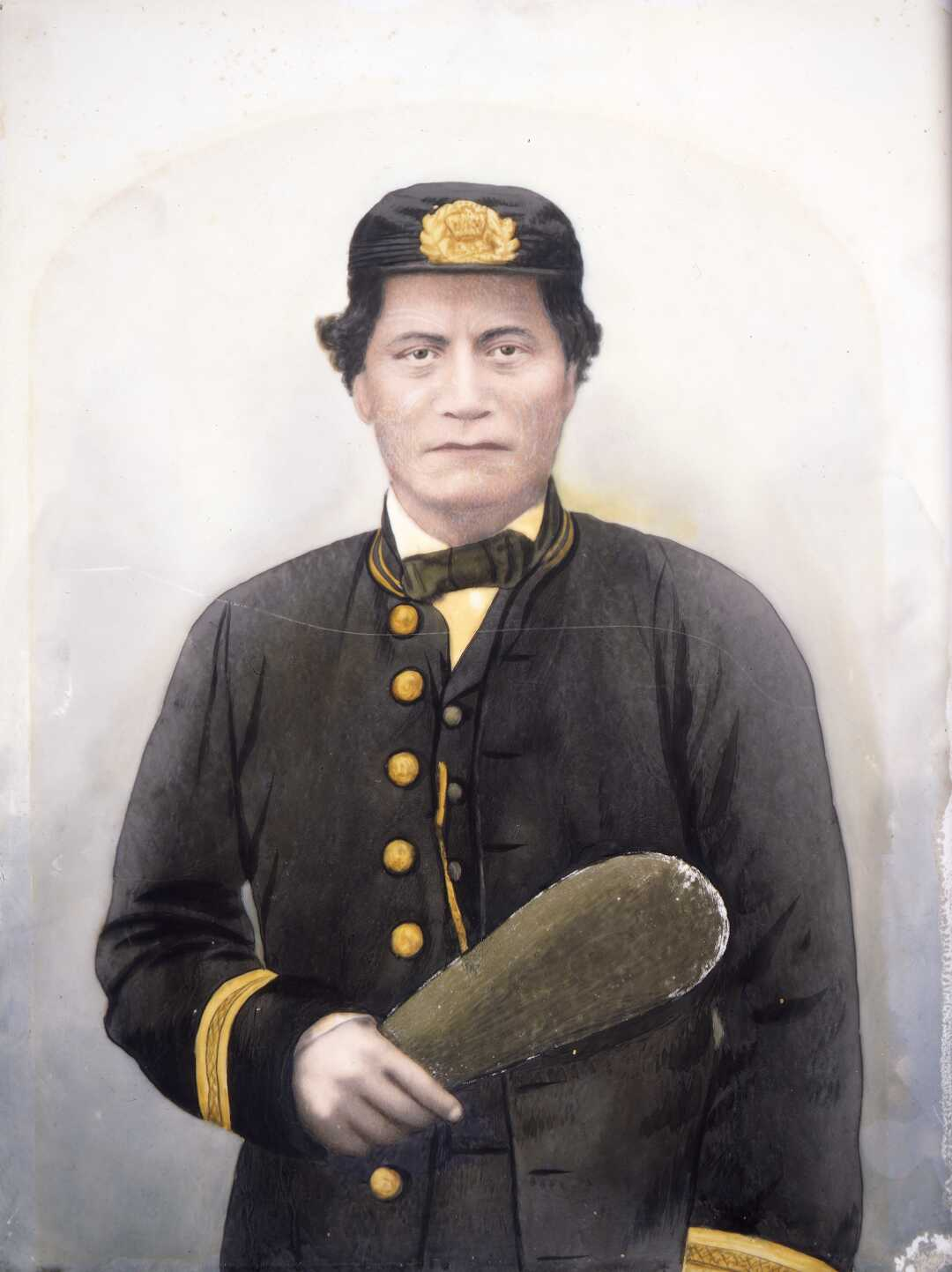
Chief Rawiri Puaha of Ngāti Toa who fought alongside Colonial forces at the Battle of Battle Hill.

A special 65-man bush-scouring corps, the Forest Rangers, composed of local farmers who were familiar with the bush, had proven guerrilla techniques and were capable of "roughing it", was formed in August 1863; the Forest Rangers split into two separate companies in November, with the second led by Gustavus von Tempsky and both served in Waikato and Taranaki. Other rangers corps during the New Zealand wars included the Taranaki Bush Rangers, Patea Rangers, Opotiki Volunteer Rangers, Wanganui Bush Rangers and Wellington Rangers. From September 1863 the first contingents of what was planned as 5,000 military settlers—recruited on the goldfields of Australia and Otago with promises of free grants of land confiscated from "rebel" Māori—also began service in the Waikato. By the end of October the number of military settlers, known as the Waikato Militia, had reached more than 2,600, the majority having come from Australia. By March 1864 troop numbers peaked at 9,000 Imperial troops, 4,000 Colonial troops (3,600 of them Australians), a few hundred kūpapa (Māori that fought for the British) for a combined force of about 14,000.

In November 1864 Premier Frederick Weld introduced a policy of "self-reliance" for New Zealand, which included the gradual but complete withdrawal of Imperial troops, who would be replaced by a colonial force of 1,500. The move came at a time of rising conflict between Grey, who sought more extensive military operations to "pacify" the west coast of the North Island between Taranaki and Wanganui, and Cameron, who regarded such a campaign as unnecessary, impractical and contrary to Imperial policy. Grey blocked Cameron's attempts to dispatch the first regiments from New Zealand in May 1865 and the first regiment finally embarked in January 1866. By May 1867 only the 2/18th Regiment remained in the country, their departure delayed by political pressure over the "peril" still facing settlers; the last soldiers finally left in February 1870.

=== Māori ===
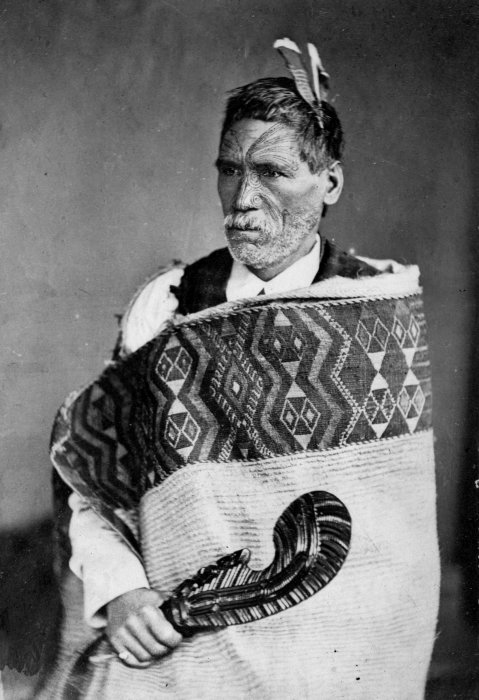
Rewi Maniapoto in 1879

About 15 of the 26 major North Island tribal groups sent contingents to join the Waikato campaign, although sometimes they represented a single hapū (clan) within the tribe. Continual presence on battlefields remained difficult for most, however, because of the constant need for tribal labour in their home community, so there was a constant turnover of small tribal groups. At Meremere, Paterangi, Hangatiki and Maungatatauri, between August 1863 and June 1864 Māori maintained forces of between 1,000 and 2,000 men, but troops were forced to disperse after each campaign because of labour and domestic needs at home. Belich has estimated that the total Māori mobilisation was at least 4,000 warriors, representing one-third of the total manpower available.

Although they were not part of a structured command system, Māori generally followed a consistent strategic plan, uniting to build skilfully engineered defensive lines up to 22 kilometres (14 mi) long. Māori united under proven military commanders, including Rewi Maniapoto and Tikaokao of Ngāti Maniapoto and Wiremu Tamihana of Ngāti Hauā.

== Strategy and tactics ==
Campaigners on both sides of the New Zealand wars had developed distinctive war strategies and tactics. The British set out to fight a European-style war, based on engaging with the opposing forces, besieging and then capturing fortified positions. The British Army were professional soldiers who had experience fighting in various parts of the Empire, many from India and Afghanistan and were led by officers who were themselves trained by men who had fought at Waterloo.

Many of the Māori fighters had been raised during the Musket Wars, the decades-long bitter intertribal fighting during which warriors had perfected the art of building defensive fortifications around a pā. During the Flagstaff War, Kawiti and Heke appear to have followed a strategy of drawing the colonial forces into attacking a fortified pā, from which the warriors could fight from a strong defensive position that was secure from cannon fire.

The word pā means a fortified strong point near a Māori village or community. They were built with a view to defence, but primarily they were built to safely store food. The pā at Puketutu and Ōhaeawai were the first of the so-called "gunfighter pā", built to engage enemies armed with muskets and cannons. A strong, wooden palisade was fronted with woven flax leaves (Phormium tenax) whose tough, stringy foliage absorbed much of the force of the ammunition. The palisade was lifted a few centimetres from the ground so muskets could be fired from underneath rather than over the top. Sometimes there were gaps in the palisade, which led to killing traps. There were trenches and rifle pits to protect the occupants and, later, very effective artillery shelters. They were usually built so that they were almost impossible to surround completely, but usually presented at least one exposed face to invite attack from that direction. They were cheap and easily built—the L-Pa at Waitara was constructed by 80 men overnight—and they were completely expendable. The British repeatedly mounted often lengthy expeditions to besiege a pā, which would absorb their bombardment and possibly one or two attacks, and then be abandoned by the Māori. Shortly afterwards, a new pā would appear in another inaccessible site. Pā like these were built in the dozens, particularly during the First Taranaki War, where they eventually formed a cordon surrounding New Plymouth, and in the Waikato campaign.

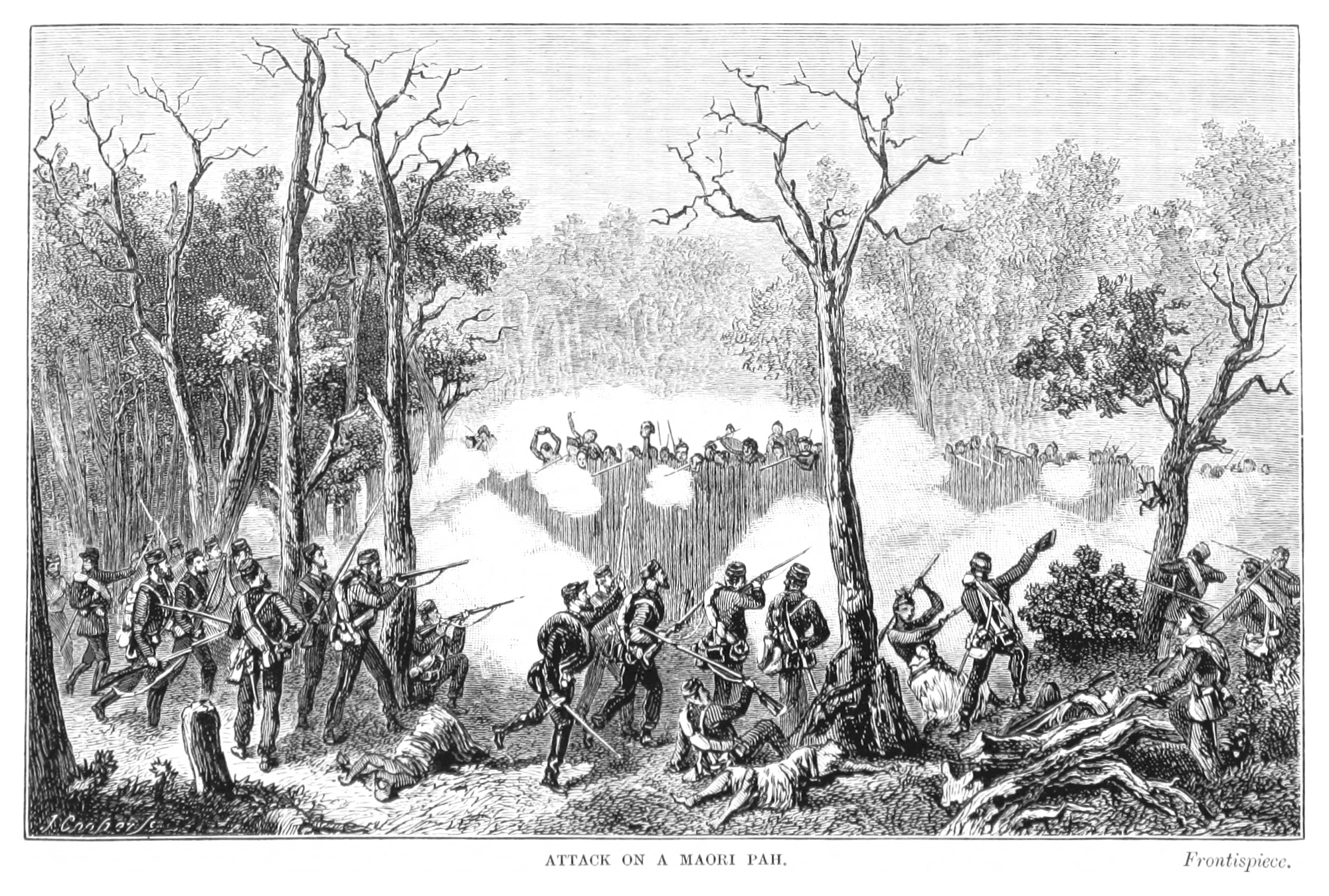
Attack on a Māori pā by Sir James Edward Alexander, Commander of the West Yorkshire Regiment.

For a long time, the modern pā effectively neutralised the overwhelming disparity in numbers and armaments. At Ōhaeawai Pā in 1845, at Rangiriri in 1863 and again at Gate Pā in 1864, British and colonial forces discovered that frontal attacks on a defended pā were extremely costly. At Gate Pā, during the 1864 Tauranga Campaign, Māori withstood a day-long bombardment in their underground shelters and trenches. The palisade destroyed, the British troops rushed the pā, whereupon Māori fired on them from hidden trenches, killing 38 and injuring many more in the most costly battle for the Pākehā of the New Zealand Wars. The troops retired and Māori abandoned the pā.

While the British could defeat Māori in battle, the defeats were often not decisive. For example, the capture of Ruapekapeka Pā can be considered a British tactical victory, but it was purpose-built as a target for the British, and its loss was not damaging; Heke and Kawiti managed to escape with their forces intact.

However the British force consisted of professional soldiers supported by an economic system capable of sustaining them in the field almost indefinitely, in contrast, the Māori warrior was a part-time fighter who also needed to work on producing food. The biggest problem for the Māori was that their society was ill-adapted to support a sustained campaign. A long campaign would disrupt food supplies and epidemics resulted in significant numbers of deaths among the Māori.

The British soon realised this was an easier way to neutralise a pā. Although cheap and easy to build, a gunfighter pā required a significant input of labour and resources. The destruction of the Māori economic base in the area around the pā made it difficult for the hapū to support the fighting men. This was the reasoning behind the bush-scouring expeditions of Chute and McDonnell in the Second Taranaki War.

== Weapons ==
The main weapon used by the British forces in the 1860s was the Pattern 1853 Enfield. Properly described as a rifled musket, it was loaded down the barrel like a conventional musket but the barrel was rifled. While muskets were accurate to about 60–80 m, an 1853 Enfield was accurate to about 300 m to 400 m in the hands of an experienced soldier; at 100 m an experienced soldier could easily hit a human target. The rifle was 1.44 m long, weighed 4 kg and had a 53 cm socket bayonet. This rifle was also commonly used in the American Civil War by both sides.

The Calisher and Terry carbine (short rifle) was ordered by the New Zealand Government from Calisher and Terry, Birmingham gunsmiths in 1861 after earlier fighting against Māori showed the need for a carbine suited to fighting in heavy bush. This was the favoured weapon of the New Zealand Forest Rangers because of its shortness, its lightness, and its ability to be reloaded while the marksman lay down—unlike the Enfield, which required the soldier to stand to load the powder—and could be loaded on the run. This feature led to a decisive victory for the Forest Rangers at Orakau: several groups of soldiers harried the fleeing Māori but only the Forest Rangers, equipped with carbines, were able to follow them 10 km to the Puniu River shooting as they went.

Revolvers were mainly used by officers but were a general issue for the Forest Rangers. The most common revolver appears to have been the five-shot Beaumont–Adams .44 percussion revolver. Other revolvers in use were the Colt Navy .36 1851 model with open top frame. The Colt was favoured by the Forest Rangers because it was light and accurate being a single-action revolver. Von Tempsky's second company of the Forest Rangers also used the Bowie knife.

== Aftermath ==
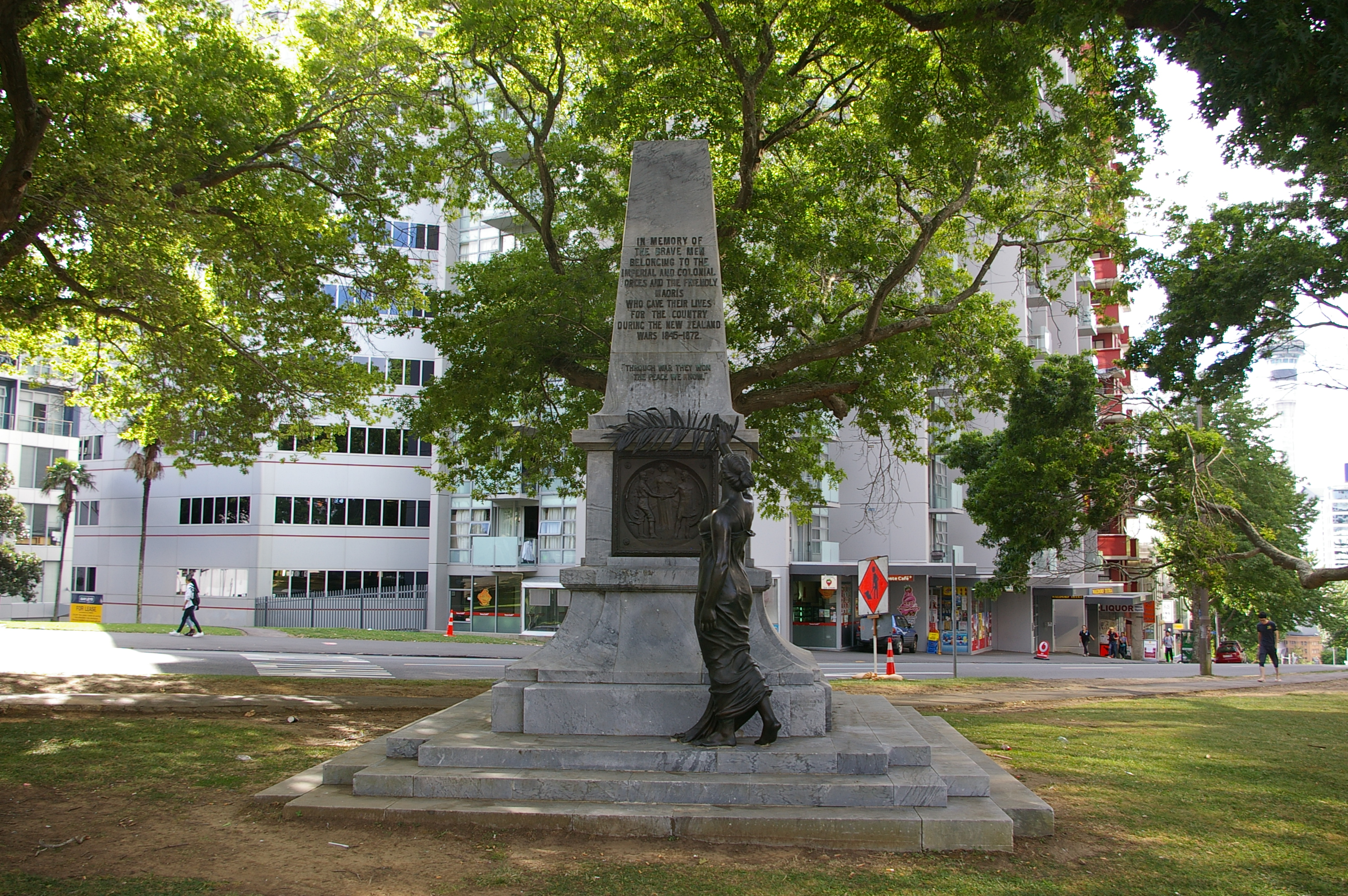
New Zealand Wars Memorial in Symonds Street, Auckland. The bronze statue at the base of the memorial is Zealandia.

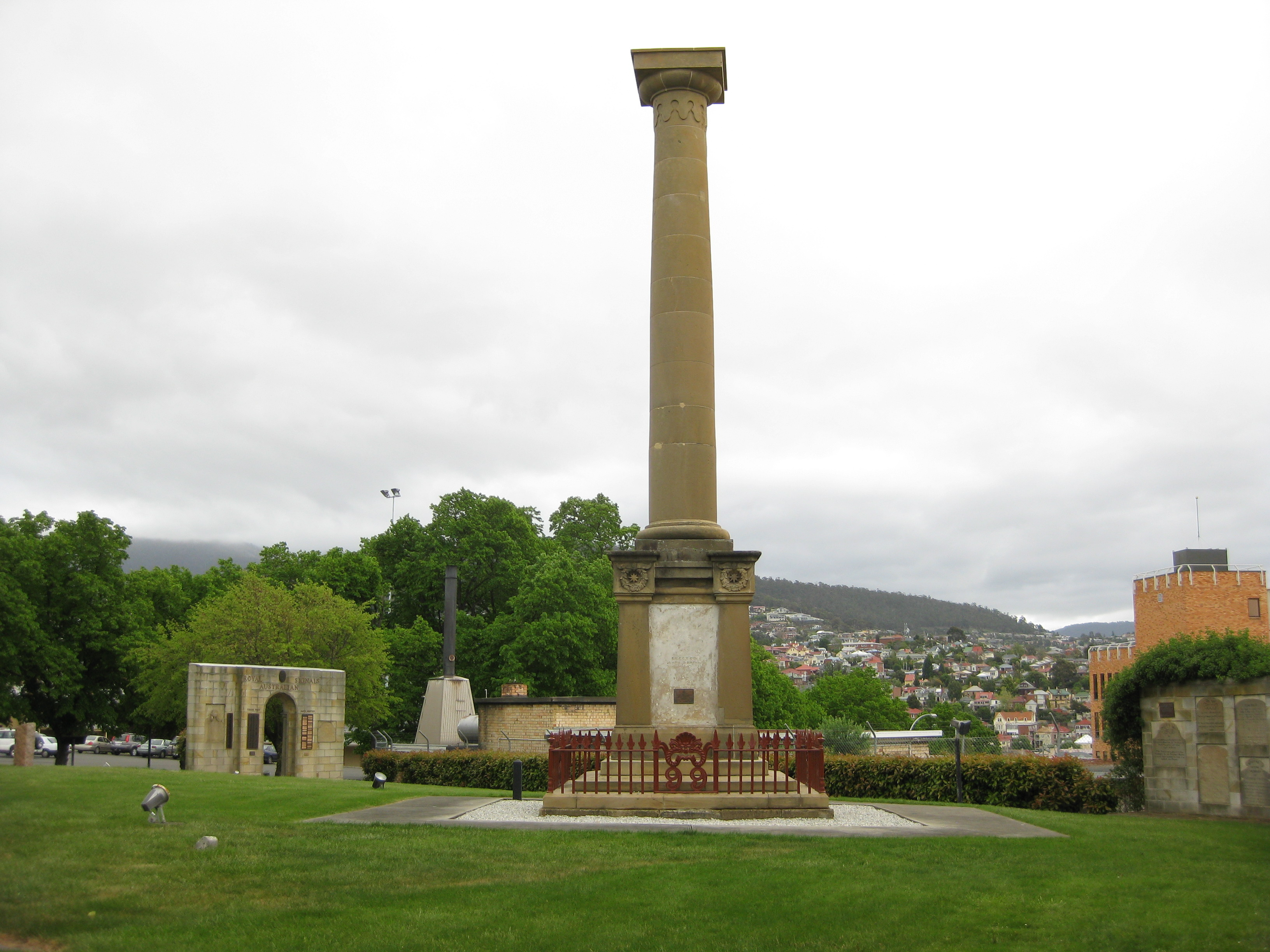
Monument erected at Anglesea Barracks, Hobart, Tasmania, Australia in 1850, in memory of the soldiers of the 99th Regiment of Foot who were killed during the New Zealand campaign of 1845–46

Large areas of land were confiscated from the Māori by the government under the New Zealand Settlements Act in 1863, purportedly as punishment for rebellion. In reality, land was confiscated from both "loyal" and "rebel" tribes alike. 1.5 million hectares of land were confiscated from tribes in Taranaki, Waikato, Tauranga and the Bay of Plenty. At the time it represented about 15% of land in Māori customary ownership. Much was returned, but not always to the original owners.

In the immediate aftermath of the wars in Taranaki, and land confiscations, a new town Parihaka was founded by Te Whiti o Rongomai, based on principles of non-violent resistance. Parihaka's population grew to over 2,000 before the government sent the constabulary to arrest Te Whiti and his supporters on 5 November 1881. Another incident in the aftermath of the New Zealand Wars was the so-called Dog Tax War of 1898.

The legacy of the New Zealand Wars continues, but these days the battles are mostly fought in courtrooms and around the negotiation table. Numerous reports by the Waitangi Tribunal have criticised Crown actions during the wars, and also found that the Māori, too, had breached the treaty. As part of the negotiated out-of-court settlements of tribes' historical claims (Treaty of Waitangi claims and settlements), as of 2011 the Crown is making formal apologies to tribes.

== Commemoration ==
The National Day of Commemoration for the New Zealand Wars was inaugurated in 2017 and is held on 28 October. In 2019, a commemorative plaque was unveiled for the New Zealand Wars in the New Zealand House of Representatives.

== The New Zealand history curriculum ==
The Day of Commemoration came about after a group of students from Otorohanga College in New Zealand had presented a petition to parliament in 2015 asking for more recognition of the Wars as an example of New Zealand history that should be taught in the country's schools. This was agreed to by the government and Jacinda Ardern, the Prime Minister announced in 2019 that within a revised curriculum, the teaching of history would be compulsory in New Zealand. A draft curriculum document was developed and trialled in 2021, and in March 2022 Aotearoa New Zealand Histories and Te Takanga o te Wa, English- and Māori-medium were officially launched.

== In popular culture ==
A number of fictionalised accounts of the New Zealand Wars have been adapted for film and literature:

- Rewi's Last Stand, silent film (1925), Remake with sound (1940) based on the last stand of Rewi Maniapoto at the Battle of Ōrākau.
- The Earthquake Shakes the Land (1944) a radio play by Douglas Stewart
- The Governor, docudrama television miniseries (1977) based on Governor Sir George Grey.
- Utu, film (1983) based on Te Kooti's War.
- Season of the Jew, novel (1987) based on Te Kooti's War.
- River Queen, film (2005) based on Tītokowaru's War in Whanganui.

== Last veterans ==
- Edwin Bezar (1838–1936), last surviving British soldier (and possibly last combatant)

== See also ==
- Early naval vessels of New Zealand
- History of New Zealand
- American Indian Wars
- Australian Frontier Wars
- Māori culture
- Military history of New Zealand
- New Zealand land confiscations
- Siege warfare
- Trench warfare
- Vincent O'Malley
