= Tītokowaru =

19th-century Māori leader; opponent of British colonisation of New Zealand

Riwha Tītokowaru
- Born: c. 1823; Okaiawa, Te Takiwā-a-Ngāti Ruanui, Taranaki
- Died: 18 August 1888 (aged 65); Ōkaiawa, Hāwera County, Colony of New Zealand
- Burial: Unknown (secret burial)

Riwha Tītokowaru (born Riwha, c. 1823 – 18 August 1888) was a Taranaki Māori rangatira, military commander, general and religious leader. He is considered to be one of the most capable and influential military strategists in New Zealand history. He waged a war against invading settlers and Crown forces which became known as Tītokowaru's War. His reputation has stayed largely the same for 150 years; James Belich has described him as "perhaps the greatest war leader either of New Zealand's peoples has ever produced".

After the period of warfare he again became an advocate for peace and made diplomatic efforts between Māori, colonial settlers and the government. He was arrested and jailed after a peaceful occupation of land near Manaia in 1886 and he died two years later in 1888.

== Early life ==
Riwha was a subtribal leader, having succeeded his father Tītokowaru the Elder (died 22 February 1848) of the Ngāti Ruanui and Ngāruahine iwi in South Taranaki. A lot of what was accomplished by his father had been wrongly attributed to the son; being events of intertribal warring during his time of preadolescence. There is some mystery about his early life, but he is known to have become a Methodist in 1842 having been baptised and given the name of Hohepa Otene (named after the missionary). He joined the Kīngitanga movement and fought in the First Taranaki War in 1860 and 1861.

In 1865 and 1866, British troops conducted a punitive campaign throughout Taranaki, though they were unable to force a decisive result.

In 1867, the year was declared by Tītokowaru to be a year of peace, "the year of the daughters...the year of the lamb", and he led over 100 of his followers on a peace march during the winter of 1867 from Waihi, near Hāwera, down to Pātea and Whanganui and ending at Pipiriki on the upper Whanganui River.

However, continuing disputes with settlers proved intolerable and in 1868 Tītokowaru went to war.

== Tītokowaru's War (1868–69) ==
In June 1868 Tītokowaru's forces destroyed a colonist blockhouse at Turuturumokai, inland of Hāwera. The colonial response was to send a large contingent to destroy Tītokowaru's stronghold. On 7 September 1868 the colonial forces were defeated with heavy casualties. The stronghold was then abandoned. Amongst the dead was the famous Prussian adventurer Gustavus von Tempsky. Turuturumokai was, previous to becoming a Pākehā garrison, a small Māori encampment, which had been found to be abandoned. Later after careful surveying, it was also discovered that, contrary to appearances, Turuturumokai was not as inconquerable as thought by British troops. The Māori decision to leave Turuturumokai was a strategic move.

Tītokowaru then advanced southward and defeated a second colonial force at Moturoa. He then stopped at Tauranga Ika and proceeded to build another fortress pā. This diamond-shaped fortress is considered the strongest ever constructed in New Zealand according to James Belich. It had numerous underground bunkers and tunnels, which could withstand heavy bombardment. There were three types of firing positions: trenches, loopholed palisades and European-style bastions from which fire could be directed along the frontages of the diamond. On the north-west corner was a tall lookout tower. At 5 am, on 2 February 1869, the advance party moved to within a few hundred meters of the stronghold and artillery opened fire. Māori returned rifle fire from within. Under cover of darkness, the colonial force closed the fort to within shouting distance. Both sides shouted and sang to encourage themselves until at 3 am the fighting reached a peak, gradually dying away until daybreak. At dawn, the army noticed the pā had gone very quiet. Three men approached the pā with great caution and found it deserted.

== Later life ==
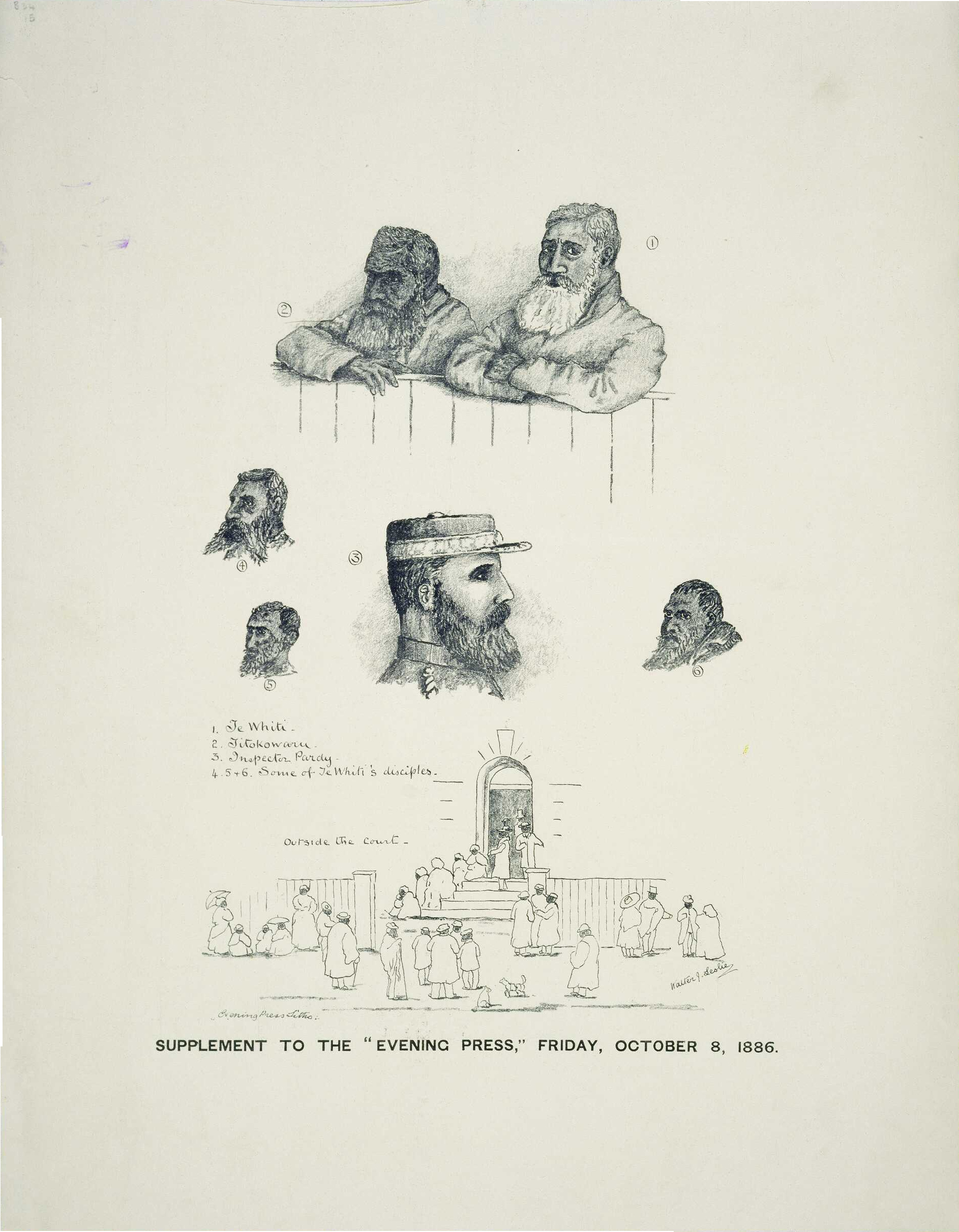
Tītokowaru (left) and Te Whiti during a trial of the latter in Wellington, 1886

His later understanding of the needed union of two peoples (Māori and settler) was incomparable. He advocated peace and diplomacy between the British and Māori. He practised his own message, demonstrating great tolerance that was noted by many settlers and authority figures of his time.

In 1886, he was part of a peaceful occupation of land near Manaia. Tītokowaru and nine others were taken to Wellington and, after being held in jail for two and a half months, were tried and sentenced to jail.

Tītokowaru suffered from pneumonia and was cared for by a nurse named Ann Evans. He died on 18 August 1888 at his home in Ōkaiawai.

Hailed as a war leader, prophet and peacemaker, Tītokowaru's story lapsed into obscurity before being popularised by New Zealand historian James Belich in his works on the New Zealand Wars. He is also the subject of a Maurice Shadbolt novel Monday's Warriors. The character, Te Kaipo, in the 2005 film River Queen, played by Temuera Morrison, is closely based on Tītokowaru.

== See also ==
- Tītokowaru's War
- New Zealand Wars
- Marian Maguire, artist whose series Titokowaru's Dilemma depicts a dialogue between Tītokowaru and Socrates
