= Ann Evans (midwife) =

New Zealand nurse and midwife (1840–1916)

Ann Evans (c.1840–4 July 1916) was a New Zealand nurse, midwife and refreshment rooms proprietor. She was born in Manchester, Lancashire, England on c.1840. She nursed the chief Tītokowaru while he was in hiding.
