= Season of the Jew =

1987 novel by Maurice Shadbolt

- Author: Maurice Shadbolt
- Language: English
- Genre: Novel
- Publisher: Hodder & Stoughton (UK) & W.W. Norton (USA)
- Publication date: 1 February 1987
- Publication place: New Zealand
- Media type: Print (Hardback & Paperback)
- Pages: 384 pp (hardback edition)
- ISBN: 0-340-39931-7 (hardback); 0-87923-753-8 (paper)
- OCLC: 14134229

Season of the Jew is a historical novel by Maurice Shadbolt, published in 1987. Set in mid-nineteenth-century New Zealand, it is a semi-fictionalized account of the story of the Māori leader Te Kooti, told from the perspective of one of his pursuers, an officer in the colonial army.

== Explanation of the title ==
The brief preface quotes Shakespeare's Shylock: “If a Christian wrong a Jew, what should his suffrance be by Christian example? Why, revenge. The villainy you teach me I will execute; and it shall go hard, but I will better the instruction.” This lays the moral ground for the resistance of the band of New Zealand natives under their leader Te Kooti, who synthesized a new religion from Christian and Māori traditions combined with his study of the Old Testament. His unique contribution was to declare his followers the latter-day embodiment of the Israelites escaping from Egypt. In the novel the rebels are often simply referred to as “the Jews.” The religion Te Kooti created, the Ringatu Church, still claims around 15,000 adherents in New Zealand today.

== Plot summary ==
In this story of New Zealand and Te Kooti's War during the year beginning November 10, 1868, the narrative coalesces around the development of its protagonist, George Fairweather, who in Shadbolt's historical epilogue is described as “A composite character ... yet still far from fictional.” Fairweather is a competent but cynical former British officer in his early forties, who leaves the service under a cloud, turns landscape painter and cultivates an air of worldly detachment. Yet he finds himself drawn by love and humanity back into the world of colonial New Zealand and the maelstrom of the New Zealand Wars, is not altogether disagreeable, as he finds to his surprise.

Pursuing Te Kooti as an officer and commander in the colonial militia, while perfecting his ability to destroy Te Kooti's rebellious “Jews” Fairweather paradoxically finds his feelings of humanity expanding to include Englishmen, colonials and Māoris, coupled with a growing resentment of racism and injustice. In the end, he almost throws his future away by struggling to save a Māori boy, Hamiora, who, like Melville's Billy Budd, was unjustly charged with treason.

With the hanging of Hamiora, November 10, 1869, and the conclusion of Fairweather's desperate attempts first to prevent and then to mitigate it, the book ends. The problem of Te Kooti is not resolved, except in the brief epilogue, further revealing the depths of Fairweather's (and Shadbolt's) ambivalence about the historical figure of Te Kooti, Fairweather's hated and admired nemesis and one-time friend.

== Awards and nominations ==
In 1987, the book received a first-place Goodman Fielder Wattie Book Award.
