= Monday's Warriors =

1990 historical novel by Maurice Shadbolt

- Author: Maurice Shadbolt
- Publisher: Godine
- Publication date: February 1, 1992
- ISBN: 0-87923-915-8

Monday's Warriors is a 1990 historical novel by New Zealand author Maurice Shadbolt. It is part two of his New Zealand Wars trilogy.

Set in mid-nineteenth century New Zealand, the story is a semi-fictionalized account of Titokowaru's War, told from the perspective of Kimball Bent. Bent was an historical individual born in the United States, but had enlisted in the British army, where he was eventually posted to the Taranaki region of colonial New Zealand. Bent deserted and joined up with a local Māori chief of the Ngā Ruahine iwi, where he became accepted as a member of the local tribe. In 1867, Bent joined other Ngāti Ruanui led by Tītokowaru in their war against the colonists in Taranaki.
