= Te Kooti =

New Zealand Māori leader

Portrait of Te Kooti, from 1889 or 1891

Te Kooti Arikirangi Te Tūruki (c. 1832–1893) was a Māori leader and guerrilla fighter who was the founder of the Ringatū religion.

While fighting alongside government forces against the Hauhau in 1865, he was accused of spying. Exiled to the Chatham Islands without trial along with captured Hauhau, he experienced visions and became a religious leader. In 1868 he led the escape of 168 prisoners, seizing the schooner Rifleman and sailing back to the North Island where he began a series of raids. A resultant military reprisal campaign became known as Te Kooti's War. He was pardoned in 1883 but continued to be active in spreading the Ringatū message of peace and reclaiming land from European settlers.

== Early life ==
Te Kooti's early years are obscure. He was born at Te Pā-o-Kahu in the Gisborne region as a son of Hōne Rangipātahi (father) and Hine Turākau (mother), of the Rongowhakaata tribe (iwi). Their sub-tribe (hapū) was Ngāti Maru, whose villages were situated near the Awapuni lagoon, where the Waipaoa River runs into the ocean. Arikirangi is thought to be the original name of Te Kooti. His birth date is thought to be approximately 1832.

Toiroa Ikariki (Ikarihi), a matakite (visionary) of Nukutaurua on Māhia Peninsula, prophesied the birth of Te Kooti (as well as the coming of white people, the Pākehā):

Tiwha tiwha te pō.
Ko te Pakerewhā
Ko Arikirangi tenei ra te haere nei.

Dark, dark is the night.
There is the Pakerewhā
There is Arikirangi to come.

The song is dated 1766. The Pakerewhā were strangers with red or white skin and Arikirangi was a grandchild of Toiroa, still to be born.

Te Kooti is understood to be his Christian baptismal name.

Te Kooti was apparently a very troublesome boy to his father, who tried to kill him. In 1852, he became notorious as one of a group of young Māori causing trouble in the Gisborne district. He took on the role of a "social bandit", breaking into settlers' homes and stealing goods as part of a plunder party. He was sent to the Mission School at Whakatō, near Manutūkē. In 1846–1847 he was taught by Samuel Williams. Samuel and his uncle, William Williams "helped the boy to find a new world in the Bible".

But his reputation was still suffering, also after contacts with the Reverend Thomas Samuel Grace, who was to replace William Williams for a few years (1850–1853). Local chiefs were asked by settlers to work with the local rūnanga (Māori council) to solve problems with Te Kooti, but Te Kooti's men persisted in taking pigs, horses, cattle and alcohol, angering the rūnanga run by senior chiefs. As a result, Te Kooti's pā was attacked by Te Aitanga-a-Māhaki. Many prisoners were taken but Te Kooti escaped.

He had to leave home and went to sea on different ships that traded along the coasts of the North Island.

== Exile ==
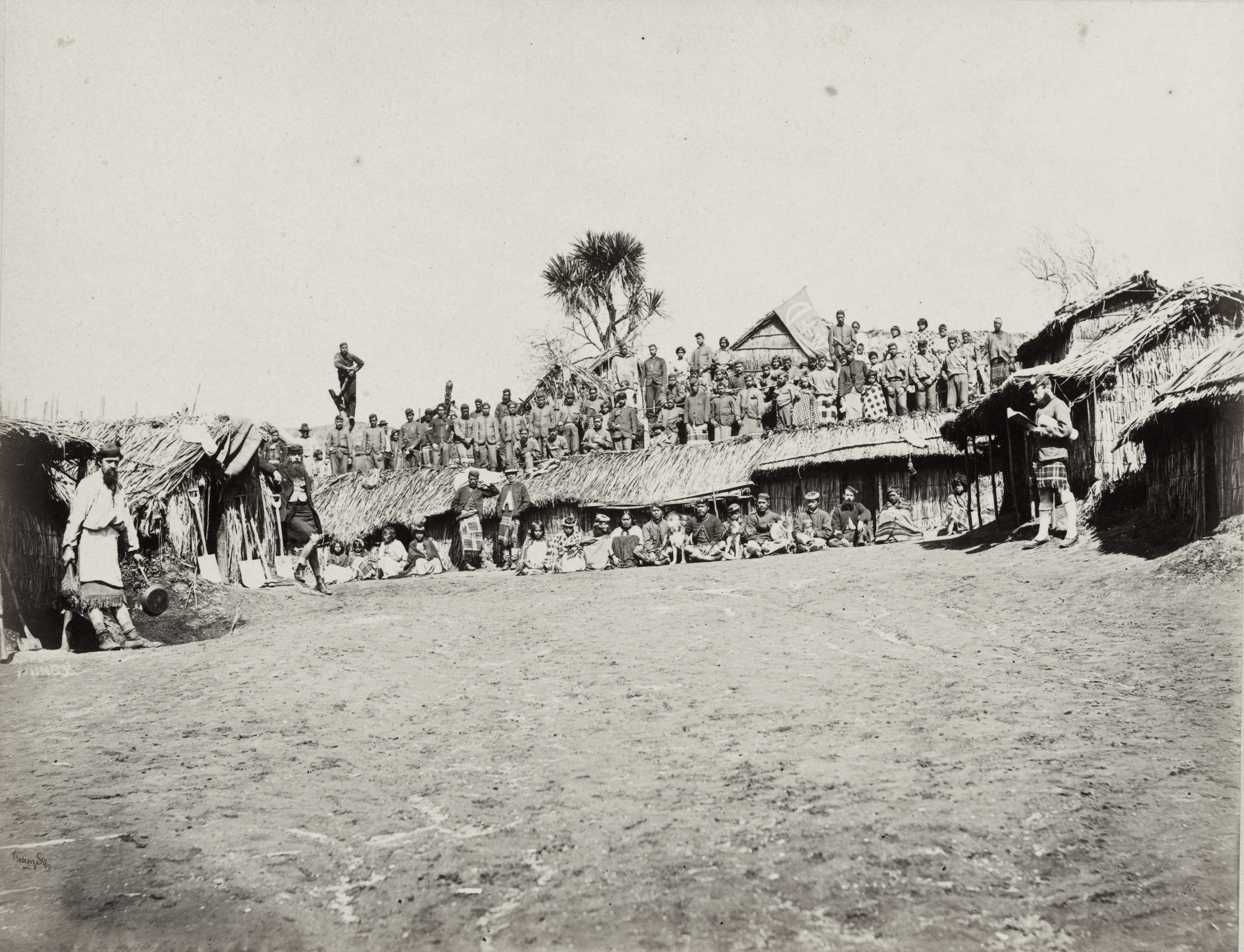
The Arawa fighting contingent, Rotokākahi (Green Lake), Aotearoa-New Zealand, 1870

In 1865 while fighting with government forces to suppress the Pai Mārire (or Hauhau cult), he was arrested as a spy while trying to contact his brother who was fighting with the Hauhau, and exiled to the Chatham Islands, together with the rebels he had been fighting against. He was never tried and took every opportunity to demand a trial. Some say he got his name from this, "Kooti" (pronounced [kɔːti] like "Courty"), others that it was a Māori version of the last name "Coates". If he did supply the Pai Mārire with guns as is alleged, he also took part in a battle against them. There are allegations he fired blanks on this occasion.

While on the Chatham Islands Te Kooti experienced visions and became a religious leader. Te Kooti was referred to by other prisoners as Tawhaki, the twice born, after his unexpected survival from tuberculosis. He also performed some sleight of hand, such as using matchheads to set his hand on fire above the altar during a church service. These tricks swayed the Māori prisoners on Chatham Islands, and when some of the chiefs present on the island were sent back to the mainland, Te Kooti took advantage of the situation to become the local leader. Only Te Kooti's uncle was not impressed by these tricks, which he saw right through. Nevertheless, Te Kooti established a faith named Ringatū ("upraised hand") which gained many followers, and is still present in New Zealand society today.

During this time on the Chatham Islands, Te Kooti (or Te Koti as he signed in the documents) was married in a civil marriage to Maata Te Owai on 27 July 1867. The marriage documents reveal that he was born in 1832.

== Escape ==
In 1868, expecting a resupply boat, Te Kooti prophesied that two boats would soon arrive to take them off the island. Normally the prisoners worked on a farm but using the excuse of rain a number of convicts were able to enter the redoubt. There were actually only 6 guards on the whole Island as the majority had been removed in April to Hokitika where a Fenian uprising was feared. On 4 July 1868, Te Kooti led an escape, and with 168 other prisoners seized the schooner Rifleman, with supplies and rifles, scuttled another vessel the Florence so that the alarm could not be raised and set off back to the North Island. One Chatham Island sergeant was killed because of a personal grievance. The Pākehā sailors were allowed to live and set sail for the coast of New Zealand with help from the Māori hijackers. The sailors attempted to sail towards Wellington, but with Te Kooti's expertise at sailing were caught and told they would be thrown overboard if they did not keep a course for the East Coast. On the fourth day at sea, the ship was becalmed and Te Kooti declared that a sacrifice was needed. Te Kooti had his uncle, Te Warihi Otini, thrown overboard and soon afterwards the ship made headway again.

Upon their arrival at Whareongaonga in Poverty Bay, Te Kooti asked the Māori King Movement and the Tūhoe tribes for refuge. Crown forces (most of which were Ngāti Porou, Ngāti Kahungunu, and Whanganui kāwanatanga) invaded Te Urewera in May 1869 in pursuit of Te Kooti, who was briefly given sanctuary by Tūhoe. He also sought dialogue with the colonial government but was rebuffed. He sent a statement to the effect that if the government wanted a war, he would give it to them in November.

== At war ==
On 10 November 1868, Te Kooti and his followers attacked the township of Matawhero on the outskirts of Gisborne. Some 60 people were slaughtered, including women and children. The dead included 30 local Māori as well as European settlers. This was probably a revenge attack, motivated by Te Kooti's imprisonment as a spy.

Te Kooti was then pursued by colonial and sympathetic Māori forces. His community was surrounded at Ngātapa and besieged, but Te Kooti and his warriors managed to escape.

From there, Te Kooti was chased to Te Pōrere where he set up a pā. He was defeated at the subsequent Battle of Te Pōrere. While Te Kooti escaped, he left many dead and wounded. Te Kooti himself was shot in the finger on his escape.

From there, Te Kooti escaped into the Urewera and made an alliance with the Tūhoe leadership.

From 1869 to 1872, Te Kooti and his followers raided throughout the central North Island while being pursued by their colonial and Māori enemies. His power was only broken once his Tūhoe allies were systematically conquered by his enemies. But once again Te Kooti managed to escape, this time to the King Country where he spent the next decade under the protection of King Tāwhiao. Te Kooti used this time to develop his religion.

== Pardon and later life ==
In 1878 Te Kooti was thrown out of a hui at Hikurangi, which had been called by the government, because he had broken the ban on alcohol that was enforced by King Tāwhiao. Te Kooti stormed out of the meeting and went into a wild rage. In the morning he returned covered in albatross feathers, shuffling and bent over, having taken on the persona of a shuffling old man. Te Kooti is portrayed in this narrative as Tāwhaki, the twice born. He threw off his disguise and lightning flashed from his armpits. The feathers were to show divinely inspired peace, according to the story.

In 1883, Te Kooti was pardoned by the government and began to travel New Zealand. His followers grew and he decided to return to his old home. However, his past violence had not been forgotten and the local magistrate arrested him and imprisoned him, citing an anticipatory breach of the peace. Te Kooti was released on the condition that he never again try to return to his old home. Te Kooti appealed this decision, and was initially successful, but in 1890 the Court of Appeal ruled that the terror and alarm that Te Kooti's reappearance would have entailed justified the magistrate's decision.

== Notes ==
=== Bibliography ===
- Beaufoy, Betty – Conflict: The Story of Te Kooti and the Settlers. Publ. Dorset Enterprises, Wellington 2006. ISBN 0-473-11015-6
- Binney, Judith. Redemption Songs: A life of Te Kooti Arikirangi Te Turuki, Auckland: Auckland University Press, 1995. ISBN 978-1-86940-131-3.
- Binney, Judith. Stories Without End. Wellington: Bridget Williams Books, 2010.
- Churchill, Winston S. (1958). The Great Democracies. A History of the English-Speaking Peoples. Vol. 4.
- King, Michael. Being Pakeha Now. Penguin, 2004
- King, Michael (2000). Moriori. Viking. ISBN 0140103910.
- Mitcalfe, Barry. "The Tohunga and the testament: Te Kooti – with a Bible in one hand, a gun in the other", pp 45–40 in Nine New Zealanders. Christchurch: 1963.

=== In fiction ===
- Shadbolt, Maurice – Season of the Jew. Publ. Hodder & Stoughton, London & W.W. Norton, New York, 1987
