= Maurice Shadbolt =

New Zealand writer (1932–2004)

Maurice Shadbolt CBE
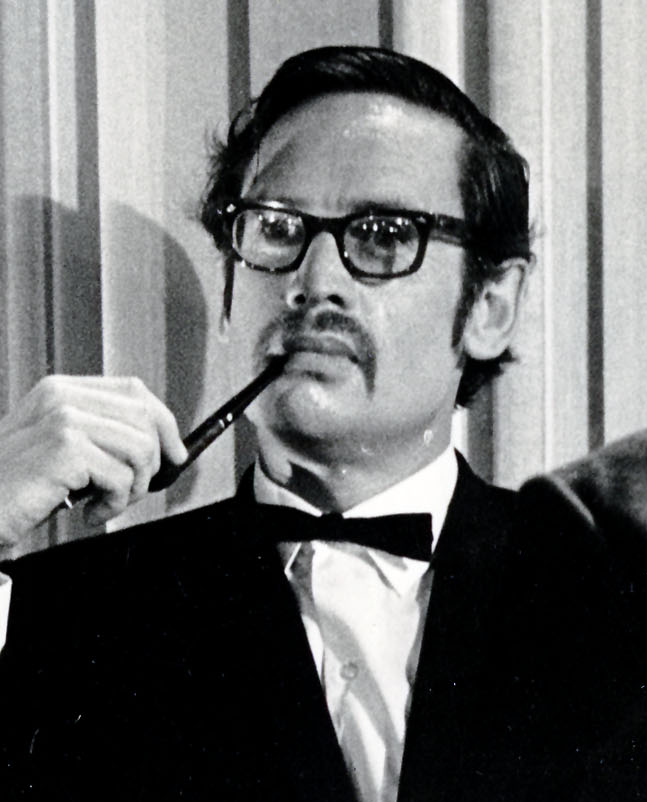
- Shadbolt, c. 1970
- Born: 4 June 1932; Auckland, New Zealand
- Died: 4 October 2004 (aged 72); Taumarunui, New Zealand
- Occupations: Novelist; short-story writer; journalist; playwright
- Children: 5
- Writing career
- Notable work: Season of the Jew

Maurice Francis Richard Shadbolt (4 June 1932 – 10 October 2004) was a New Zealand writer and occasional playwright.

== Biography ==
Shadbolt was born in Auckland, and was the eldest of three children. He had a younger brother and sister, Peter and Julia. Shadbolt was educated at Te Kuiti High School, Avondale College and Auckland University College. Shadbolt began writing for local West Auckland community newspapers. In the 1960s, he moved to Titirangi with his family, buying a house that overlooked Little Muddy Creek, where he spent the next 42 years writing.

In total, Shadbolt wrote 11 novels, four collections of short stories, two autobiographies, a war history, and a volume of journalism, as well as plays. He won the Katherine Mansfield Memorial Award for a short story three times: in 1963, 1967 and 1995. His first collection of short stories, The New Zealanders, was published in the United Kingdom and New Zealand. His most famous book is probably Season of the Jew (1987), which recounts the story of Te Kooti.

In the 1989 New Year Honours, Shadbolt was appointed a Commander of the Order of the British Empire for services to literature.

Shadbolt suffered from what was thought to be Alzheimer's disease, which during his autopsy was found to be Lewy body dementia. He died on 10 October 2004 in a Taumarunui rest home, surrounded by his children. Shadbolt had five children: Sean, Brendan and twins Tui and Daniel from his first marriage to journalist and author Gillian Heming, and Brigid from his second marriage to television presenter Barbara Magner. Shadbolt was also married to actress Bridget Armstrong. His cousin Tim Shadbolt was Mayor of Invercargill for nearly 20 years until 2022.

== Bibliography ==
His works were often published in the UK and United States as well as in New Zealand, sometimes in different years. Dates are for the first appearance.

- New Zealanders: a Sequence of Stories (1959).
- Western Samoa: The Pacific's Newest Nation (1962).
- Summer Fires and Winter Country (short stories, 1963).
- New Zealand: Gift of the Sea (1963, revised 1973).
- Among the Cinders (1965, revised 1984). A film version was released in 1983.
- The Presence of Music: Three Novellas (1967).
- New Zealand's Cook Islands: Paradise in Search of a Future (1967).
- The Shell Guide to New Zealand (1968, revised 1973).
- Isles of the South Pacific (1968).
- This Summer's Dolphin (1969). Short novel inspired by the story of Opo the dolphin.
- An Ear of the Dragon (1971). Fictional novel based on the life of Renato Amato.
- Strangers and Journeys (1972).
- A Touch of Clay (1974). Part one of a projected trilogy.
- Danger Zone (1975). Part two of the unfinished trilogy.
- Love and legend: Some 20th century New Zealanders (1976).
- Figures in Light: Selected Stories (1979).
- The Lovelock Version (1980).
- Season of the Jew (1986). Part one of the New Zealand Wars trilogy.
- Guide to New Zealand (1988).
- Voices of Galipoli (television documentary, 1988).
- Monday's Warriors (1990). Part two of the New Zealand Wars trilogy.
- Once on Chunuk Bair (1982), a play. A film version Chunuk Bair was released in 1991.
- The House of Strife (1993). Part three of the New Zealand Wars trilogy.
- One of Ben's: A New Zealand Medley (autobiography, 1993).
- Ending the Silences: Critical Essays (1994)
- Dove on the Waters (novellas, 1996).
- Selected Stories of Maurice Shadbolt, edited by Ralph Crane (1998).
- From the Edge of the Sky: A Memoir (1999).

== See also ==
- New Zealand literature
