= Samuel Austin (soldier) =

Samuel Austin NZC
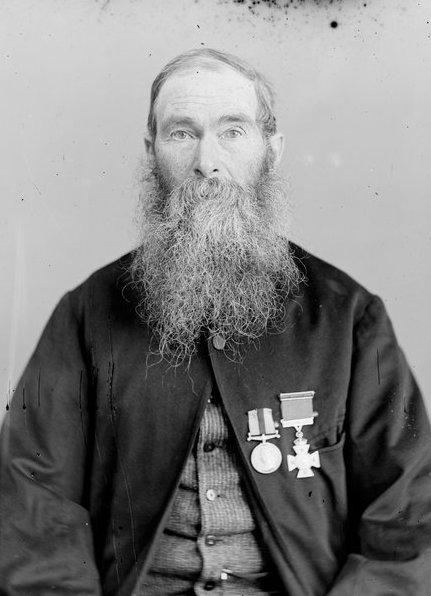
- Born: 8 June 1831; Tandragee, County Armagh, Northern Ireland
- Died: 25 January 1903 (aged 71); Whanganui, New Zealand
- Military career
- Service years: 1844–1859 (British Army); 1865–1870 (New Zealand militia)
- Rank: Sergeant
- Units: Whanganui Native Contingent; 65th Regiment of Foot
- Conflicts: New Zealand Wars: Hutt Valley campaign; Second Taranaki War; Tītokowaru's War; Te Kooti's War

Samuel Austin NZC (8 June 1831 – 25 January 1903) was an Irishman who served with the British Army and the New Zealand colonial militia. He was a recipient of one of the world's rarest gallantry decorations, the New Zealand Cross.

Born in County Armagh, Austin joined the British Army in 1844 and was posted to the 65th Regiment of Foot. He served in Ireland, Australia and in New Zealand, where he fought in the Hutt Valley campaign. He lived in Whanganui after his discharge, taking up labouring work to support his family. He was called up for service in militia during the Second Taranaki War and was posted to the Whanganui Native Contingent (WNC) as the unit's quartermaster. He was involved in several engagements during the conflict and on two instances rescued wounded officers while under fire. He was later awarded the New Zealand Cross for these actions. He was part of the WNC's involvement in the pursuits of Tītokowaru and Te Kooti. Returning to civilian life in 1870, he worked as a labourer. He died in January 1903.

== Early life ==
Born on 8 June 1831 at Tandragee, in County Armagh, Northern Ireland, Samuel Austin was the younger of two boys born to James Austin, a weaver, and his wife Hannah née Greenaway. In August 1844, having received some basic schooling, he was working as a weaver when he decided to join the British Army.

== Service with the British Army ==
Claiming to be 15 years of age, Austin was posted as a private to the 65th Regiment of Foot, then serving at Mullingar, in the Irish Midlands. At the time, the regiment was helping to control increasing unrest in the Midlands. It shortly moved to Castlebar, fulfilling a similar function. During this time Austin became ill and had to be hospitalised for several weeks. In 1845, Austin's company was sent to Sheerness, where it was to guard convicts on prison ships destined for Australia. At the end of the year, he was part of a detachment of the 65th Regiment that provided guards for the China, which carried 200 convicts to Norfolk Island. After transporting the convicts to their destination, the China and Austin's detachment went onto Sydney, arriving in June 1846.

== New Zealand ==
The following month, Austin's detachment was sent to New Zealand, in response to a request from its governor, Sir George Grey, for British troops to assist in putting down unrest in the country. In early August, he was involved in the Battle of Battle Hill, an attack on a pā (fortress) of Te Rangihaeata, a Māori war chief, during the Hutt Valley campaign. He was then part of a detachment engaged in patrolling duties in the bush area around Pāuatahanui before joining a garrison at a blockhouse in Paremata. For several months, he was engaged in road construction for several months before being sent to Whanganui in June 1847 along with 150 other soldiers of the 65th Regiment. He fought in the Whanganui campaign against the forces of Te Mamaku.

On 30 May 1851, Austin married Lavinia née Newport, the daughter of an English settler and his wife, at the mission church in Putiki. In August 1854, he was posted to Wellington, to serve in the headquarters of the 65th Regiment. The following year he was promoted to corporal. After a period of service in Napier as a medical orderly, in July 1859, he was discharged from the British Army with the rank of sergeant, having completed his period of service.

Returning to Whanganui, Austin took up labouring work to supplement the financial grant that he received upon his discharge. He was also due a land grant for his military service. In May 1860, he joined the local militia, the Whanganui Volunteers, serving as an officer and then as the drill instructor for the Whanganui District. His land grant was allocated at the end of the following year, and this was an allotment of 84 acres to the northeast of Whanganui. He took up farming, running cattle and poultry. This, along with his growing family for he had three children by 1863, impacted the amount of time he was able to spend on militia duties.

=== Service with the Whanganui Native Contingent ===
For much of 1864 and 1865, the area around Whanganui and the Taranaki experienced increasing tensions due to the growth of the Hauhau movement. There was increasing violence between followers of the Hauhau and British troops and colonists and thus lead to the Second Taranaki War. When a neighbour was murdered by the Hauhau, Austin moved his family into Whanganui and was called up for the militia. Much to his frustration, his stock was confiscated for food for the militia. He was deployed to Parikino, on attachment to the 57th Regiment of Foot from March to June 1865 as its pay clerk. He then returned to Whanganui and was posted to the Whanganui Native Contingent (WNC), a unit of around 100 Māori kūpapa (Māori allied to the New Zealand Government), under the command of Te Keepa Te Rangihiwinui. One of the few pākehas (European New Zealanders) in the WNC, he served as its quartermaster, controlling supplies for the unit, and also drilled its soldiers. He was involved in an attack on Weraroa pā, held by the Hauhau, on 21 July, leading a party of WNC although it was largely empty by the time they arrived.

Around 300 men of the WNC, including Austin, were involved in Major General Trevor Chute's campaign against the Taranaki tribes and on 30 December, along with other colonial units and elements of the 14th, 18th and 50th Regiments, departed from Whanganui on an expedition into Southern Taranaki. On 4 January 1866, the British forces captured Okotuku pā and then three days sought to capture Pūtahi pā. During this action, the commander of the WNC, Major Thomas McDonnell, was wounded. Despite being under heavy fire, Austin rescued McDonnell and moved him to cover. Later in the year, he performed a similar action at Keteonetea, rescuing another wounded soldier; this happened to be Captain William McDonnell, the brother of Major McDonnell.

The WNC was later involved in a followup campaign in the Taranaki from August to November, led by McDonnell, and the hunt for Kereopa Te Rau, who had murdered the missionary Carl Völkner at Ōpōtiki in March 1865 and who was hiding in the Urewera ranges. From June 1868, they were part of further campaigning in the Taranaki, this time against Tītokowaru, a prophet agitating against colonial forces in the area and the following year was dispatched to the East Coast in pursuit of Te Kooti, another prophet who had attacked settlers in the Poverty Bay region. Their last major engagement was at the Battle of Te Pōrere, where Te Kooti was defeated but escaped. While the WNC returned to Whanganui while Austin briefly was in charge of stores in Auckland before going to Wellington to await clearance to pay the WNC their outstanding wages. During this time his wife died in child birth. He went to Whanganui to see to the funeral before going back to Wellington, leaving his teenage daughter in charge of the family. The funds for wages were eventually released and after organising its distribution to the soldiers of the WNC, he ended his military career.

== Later life ==
Returning to civilian life, Austin performed labouring work in Whanganui but struggled for money and had to mortgage his house in October 1872. The same year he was involved in a dispute with the Defence Department in relation to not being awarded the New Zealand War Medal for his time in the militia. The medal was originally limited to military personnel of the British Army and Royal Navy who had served in New Zealand but in 1869, eligibility was extended to the colonial militia. Although Austin had received the medal in relation to his service with the 65th Regiment, he believed he was entitled to a second medal for the period of time he was with the WNC. The Defence Department did not agree with him and declined to issue another medal, which remained a sore point with Austin for the rest of his life.

=== New Zealand Cross ===
The following year, Austin was nominated by Keepa for an award of the New Zealand Cross (NZC) for his service during the campaign in the Taranaki and the fighting against Te Kooti. The NZC was instituted in 1869 to recognised acts of gallantry performed by the country's colonial military forces and four years later, nominations were invited for scrutiny by a commission. Keepa's efforts to have Austin receive the NZC were supplemented by Major McDonnell, who wrote to the Secretary of Defence explaining the events that occurred at Keteonetea. Chute, who had witnessed Austin's actions at Pūtahi pā where he had rescued McDonnell under fire, also wrote in support. On 15 May 1876, the award was approved by George Phipps, the Governor of New Zealand. The citation for Austin's NZC, published in the New Zealand Gazette, read:

For gallant and distinguished conduct on the 7th January, 1866, when, at the capture of the Putahi Pa, Lieutenant Colonel McDonnell was severely wounded and Sergeant Austin carried him during a great part of the engagement under raking fire, and finally off the field, which action was witnessed by General Chute, who then thanked him for his fearless and heroic conduct not only in this instance, but on all occasions during the campaign on the West Coast. Also on 17th October, 1866 at the capture of the village of Keteonetea, Captain William McDonnell leading a small advance guard of Maoris, came upon an ambush, and fell severely wounded; his men leaving him, retired on the main body, who commenced to retreat, when Sergeant Austin, assisted by another man (since dead), returned to where Captain McDonnell lay, on the point of being tomahawked by the enemy, and at all risks carried him off under a heavy fire.

— New Zealand Gazette, No. 27, 11 May 1876

Austin was presented with the NZC in March 1876 in a ceremony at Wanganui, with Keepa and Thomas Adamson also being awarded the medal at the same time. Only 23 awards of the NZC were made, all for actions that took place during the New Zealand Wars, making it one of the rarest gallantry awards in the world.

== Final years ==
The award of the NZC entitled Austin to a small annual pension of £10. In late 1876, he began to receive a daily allowance as an out-pensioner, qualifying as a result of his service with the 65th Regiment, from the Royal Hospital at Chelsea; this amounted to £6 a year. By this time he was a farm worker. Socially, he was involved in the Orange Order, rising to Worshipful Master in the Whanganui Lodge by 1876, and helping establish a second Lodge the next year.

In February 1879, Austin married 26-year-old Alice Arnold, a servant from Lincolnshire who had emigrated to Whanganui the previous year. The couple would have four children. Life became easier for Austin, who was no longer labouring but instead was selling vegetables grown on land surrounding his property while his wife worked as a midwife. His health was in serious decline by 1895, and the same year he transferred ownership of his land to his wife. Austin died on 25 January 1903 at his home. He was given a military funeral and buried in the town's Old Cemetery, survived by his wife and the eight children of his two marriages.
