= Battle of Te Pōrere =

1869 battle in Te Kooti's War

- Part of Te Kooti's War
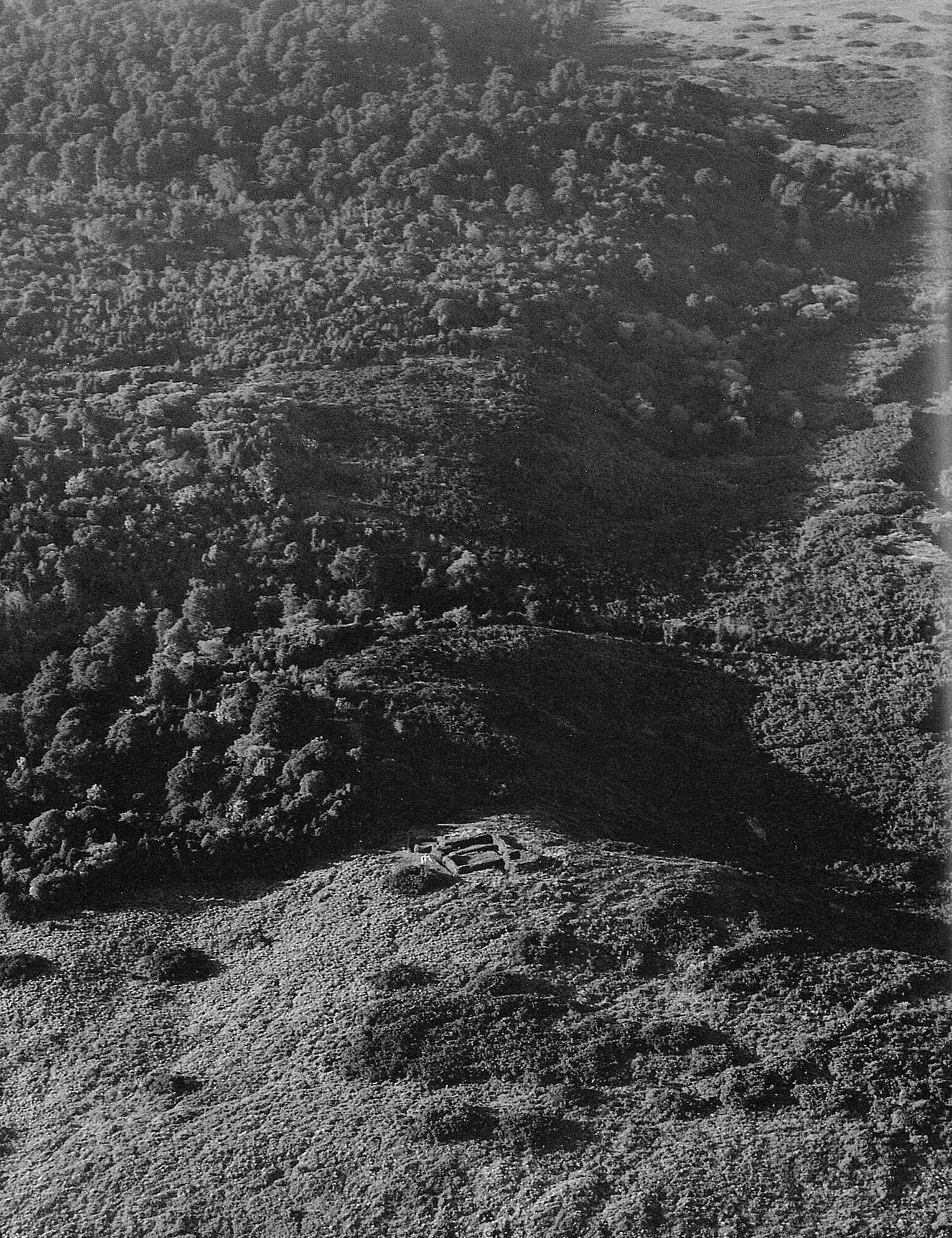
- A view, looking north, of the upper redoubt at Te Pōrere
Date	4 October 1869
Location	Te Pōrere, Tongariro, New Zealand 39°2′47″S 175°35′10″E
Result	Government victory

Belligerents
New Zealand: Armed Constabulary; Kūpapa	Ringatū

Commanders and leaders
Thomas McDonnell	Te Kooti

Strength
600–650	200–300

Casualties and losses
4 killed	37 killed

The Battle of Te Pōrere was an engagement that took place at Te Pōrere on 4 October 1869 in the Central Plateau region of New Zealand's North Island during Te Kooti's War. It was the last major engagement of the New Zealand Wars, a series of conflicts between the British, the local authorities and their Māori allies on one side, and several Māori iwi (tribes) on the other, that took place from 1843 to 1872.

Te Kooti, the founder of the Ringatū religion, gathered a following of disenfranchised Māori who like himself had been exiled in 1866 to the Chatham Islands by the government. In July 1868, he and his followers escaped to the mainland, landing on the East Coast. Over the next several months, Te Kooti and his adherents skirmished with the local militia, the Armed Constabulary and Māori aligned with the government—known as kūpapa. After a defeat at Ngatapa in January 1869, Te Kooti moved into the interior of the central North Island, finding refuge initially in the Te Urewera ranges before moving to the Central Plateau later in the year.

Te Pōrere was a pā (hillfort) that was constructed in the style of a redoubt and garrisoned by Te Kooti and his Ringatū warriors in September. A force of Armed Constabulary and kūpapa, commanded by Lieutenant Colonel Thomas McDonnell, was still in pursuit of Te Kooti and on 4 October, attacked Te Pōrere. Te Kooti's skirmishers quickly fell back from outlying fortifications to the poorly designed main redoubt. This was quickly overwhelmed by the attackers with relatively few losses. The battle was a major defeat for Te Kooti and at least 37 of his followers were killed and many others taken prisoner. Wounded during the engagement, he escaped into the bush along with other survivors. Te Kooti never again fought from a prepared defensive position and instead reverted to a guerilla campaign until 1872, when he found refuge in the King Country. He was pardoned several years later.

== Background ==
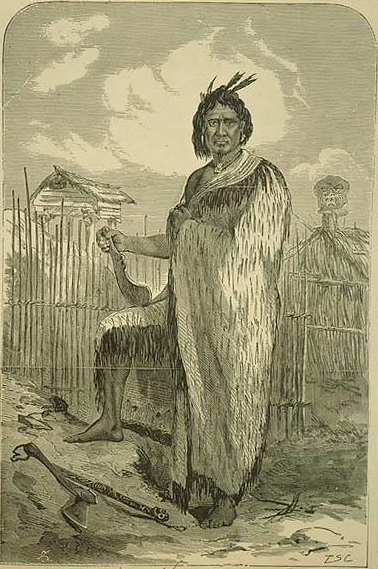
A drawing purported to be of Te Kooti, though there are doubts about this

From 1843 to 1872, there were a series of conflicts in New Zealand between some local Māori people on one side, and British imperial and colonial forces and their Māori allies on the other. These clashes are collectively termed the New Zealand Wars. While some of the wars of this period were as a result of land confiscations or clashes with the Māori King Movement, many of the later conflicts were due to the rise of prophetic Māori leaders and religious movements which threatened the autonomy of the government. These movements also subverted tribalism so often were met with hostility by the leaders of many iwi (tribes) as well. Te Kooti's War was the last of these later wars, and marked the final field engagements of the New Zealand Wars.

The earliest conflicts of the New Zealand Wars saw Māori warriors using muskets in addition to their traditional weapons, such as striking staffs—or taiaha—and war clubs—or mere. By the time of Te Kooti's War, they were equipped with modern Snider–Enfield rifles; either captured in battle or purchased from arms dealers. They still retained their close combat weapons and were also known to use shotguns. Their opponents also used Snider-Enfield rifles but could rely on more reliable and robust supplies of ammunition compared to the Māori, who would have to rely on what they captured or scavenged.

=== Te Kooti ===
Te Kooti was a Māori warrior of the Rongowhakaata iwi (tribe) who in 1865 had fought on the side of the New Zealand colonial government against the Pai Mārire religious movement during the siege of Waerenga-a-Hika in Poverty Bay. Afterwards, already regarded as a troublemaker by the settlers in the region and some local Māori, he was arrested on the grounds of being a spy after communications between Te Kooti and a Pai Mārire leader was intercepted. In March 1866 he was exiled without a trial to the Chatham Islands along with 200 Pai Mārire warriors and their families. While there he developed his own religion, Ringatū. In 1868, he and his followers escaped from captivity and commandeered a vessel to take them to the East Coast region, landing back at Poverty Bay in July.

=== Pursuit of Te Kooti ===
Te Kooti and his Ringatū warriors were pursued by the local militia in order to prevent them moving inland. A series of defeats followed for the militia and Te Kooti was able to establish a base at Puketapu in the mountains bordering Poverty Bay. On the night of 9–10 November, Te Kooti and his Ringatū men mounted a surprise attack on a number of communities in Poverty Bay, massacring community leaders and settlers, their families, and some local Māori in revenge—or utu—for Te Kooti's banishment to the Chathams. Te Kooti remained in control of the area for a week, taking prisoners and gathering weapons and supplies.

As a result of the massacre at Poverty Bay, the government were now determined to deal with Te Kooti, placing a bounty for his capture and sending a force of Armed Constabulary to the region. The Armed Constabulary was a paramilitary law enforcement agency commanded by Lieutenant Colonel George Whitmore and formed New Zealand's main defence force at the time. In the interim, the militia and kūpapa—Māori warriors aligned with the government—chased Te Kooti. In December Te Kooti withdrew to a pā (hillfort) at Ngatapa, and by the end of the month was surrounded and besieged there by the Armed Constabulary and kūpapa. Te Kooti and his followers escaped during the night of 4 January 1869 although, once it was realised that he had slipped away, many of his men were captured and executed in the subsequent pursuit through the bush the next morning.

Te Kooti found shelter with the Tūhoe iwi in the Urewera ranges and regathered over the next several weeks, mounting raids on communities to the east in March and April. In reply, a punitive invasion by 1,300 Armed Constabulary and kūpapa was launched into the Ureweras in May and although this did not result in Te Kooti's capture, he lost the support of the majority of the Tūhoe iwi. In early June, he and his Ringatū followers, which now included some Tūhoe people, moved westwards towards the Central Plateau region around Lake Taupō. His movements in this direction were detected when Te Kooti attacked a patrol of militia cavalry at Opepe on 7 June, killing nine. There was a temporary halt in the pursuit of the Ringatū, due to a change of government; the incoming Minister of Defence, Donald McLean, needed to reassess the strategy for dealing with Te Kooti following his move to the Central Plateau.

In the interim, Te Kooti sought the support of the Kīngitanga (Māori King Movement) for a campaign to take back land confiscated by the government but was rebuffed. He also worked to build up his following, gathering some followers among the local iwi, Ngāti Tūwharetoa, but at least some of these were as a result of duress which alienated others of the tribe.

== Prelude ==
By August, McLean now resolved to deal with Te Kooti by relying primarily on a force of kūpapa. Some members of the Armed Constabulary had mutinied which meant he did not have as many as he would have liked available for engagements in the Central Plateau. The force was to be commanded by Lieutenant Colonel Thomas McDonnell, who was conversant in the Māori language. He had about 100 Armed Constabulary under his command with the balance of his force being kūpapa. McLean recruited from Te Arawa iwi, and a force of 50 kūpapa, commanded by Captain John St George and Lieutenant George Preece, duly arrived at Lake Taupō, assembling with McDonnell's Armed Constabulary at a camp at Poutu. Here they joined at least 130 warriors of Ngāti Tūwharetoa, the local iwi, who had joined the government forces to fight against Te Kooti. Later in the month, about 230 Ngāti Kahungunu, led by Henare Tomoana and Rēnata Kawepō, from the East Coast region, also joined the hunt as did a contingent of around 120 to 160 Whanganui kūpapa commanded by Major Te Keepa Te Rangihiwinui. The latter party was the last to join the government forces, on 1 October. Having travelled some distance, McDonnell deferred taking action against Te Kooti until the Whanganui kūpapa had rested.

Aware of the build up of the forces against him, Te Kooti mounted disruptive attacks during September; one, mounted on 12 September against a force of mounted Kahungunu at Tauranga Taupō caused the loss of some of its horses and three wounded kūpapa. His own losses were three killed and several wounded. Te Kooti attacked a separate force of Kahungunu on 26 September and again incurred greater losses than the kūpapa; five killed and at least twice this number wounded.

Through the efforts of his scouts, McDonnell believed that Te Kooti and his followers had gathered at the village of Papakai. McDonnell now moved his force to Kotukutuku, which was at the northern side of Lake Rotoaira, to the west of Lake Taupō, departing on 2 October. Te Keepa's Wanganui contingent and the Kahungunu kūpapa were ordered to move in behind Papakai, leaving on 3 October. McDonnell intended for this force to cut off Te Kooti's escape from Papakai while his own party attacked from the opposing direction. However, the progress of the Whanganui and Kahungunu was slow and they made camp for the evening partway through the journey.

Te Keepa's force reached Papakai on the morning of 4 October, at around 7:00 am, and was joined shortly afterwards by McDonnell. The village had been abandoned and so the government forces commenced breakfast. However, about 2 miles (3.2 km) to the west, was Te Kooti's pā of Te Pōrere, clearly visible to McDonnell and his men. Scouts shortly reported that a skirmish party of Ringatū was heading towards Papakai.

=== Te Pōrere ===
Te Pōrere had been built in September, most likely by Te Kooti and his followers although it is possible that it was constructed by local Tūwharetoa. Ormond Wilson, writing in 1961, considers this doubtful, noting the source for the involvement of Tūwharetoa were the unreliable memoirs of Thomas Porter, a former officer in the Armed Constabulary. Manning Te Pōrere were some 300 or so Ringatū; about 100 were Tūwharetoa, led by the chief Te Heuheu Horonuku.

The defensive works at Te Pōrere consisted of three distinct fortifications. The first was the main pā, which was actually constructed in the style of a redoubt as used by the British Army on an elevated site; this was subsequently referred to as the upper redoubt. Formed with earthen walls, an entrance was provided to its western side, close to the bush line, and this offered a line of escape while the east side faced a swampy plain leading towards Lake Rotoaira. The surrounding ditches were incomplete, particularly on the north facing wall and the southeast corner. The days leading up to the fighting at Te Pōrere had been very cold and may have slowed the construction of the fortifications. A major flaw in the upper redoubt was the construction of the loop holes provided to the walls; these lacked any declination such that the defenders needed to fire their weapons over the top of the parapet when shooting at attackers sheltering in the ditches.

The second fortification was referred to as the lower redoubt; this was positioned on the west or left bank of the upper reaches of the Whanganui River, which flowed from the western side of Tongariro mountain. It was a complex of several trenches and while providing cover nearly all round, the position lacked depth and had a limited field of view. The last fortification was a rifle pit located on the east or right bank of the Whanganui River; some distance to the southeast from the main redoubt, it may have served as an observation post. The main portion of the rifle pit was about five feet deep, with a wall thrown up on its eastern front for protection.

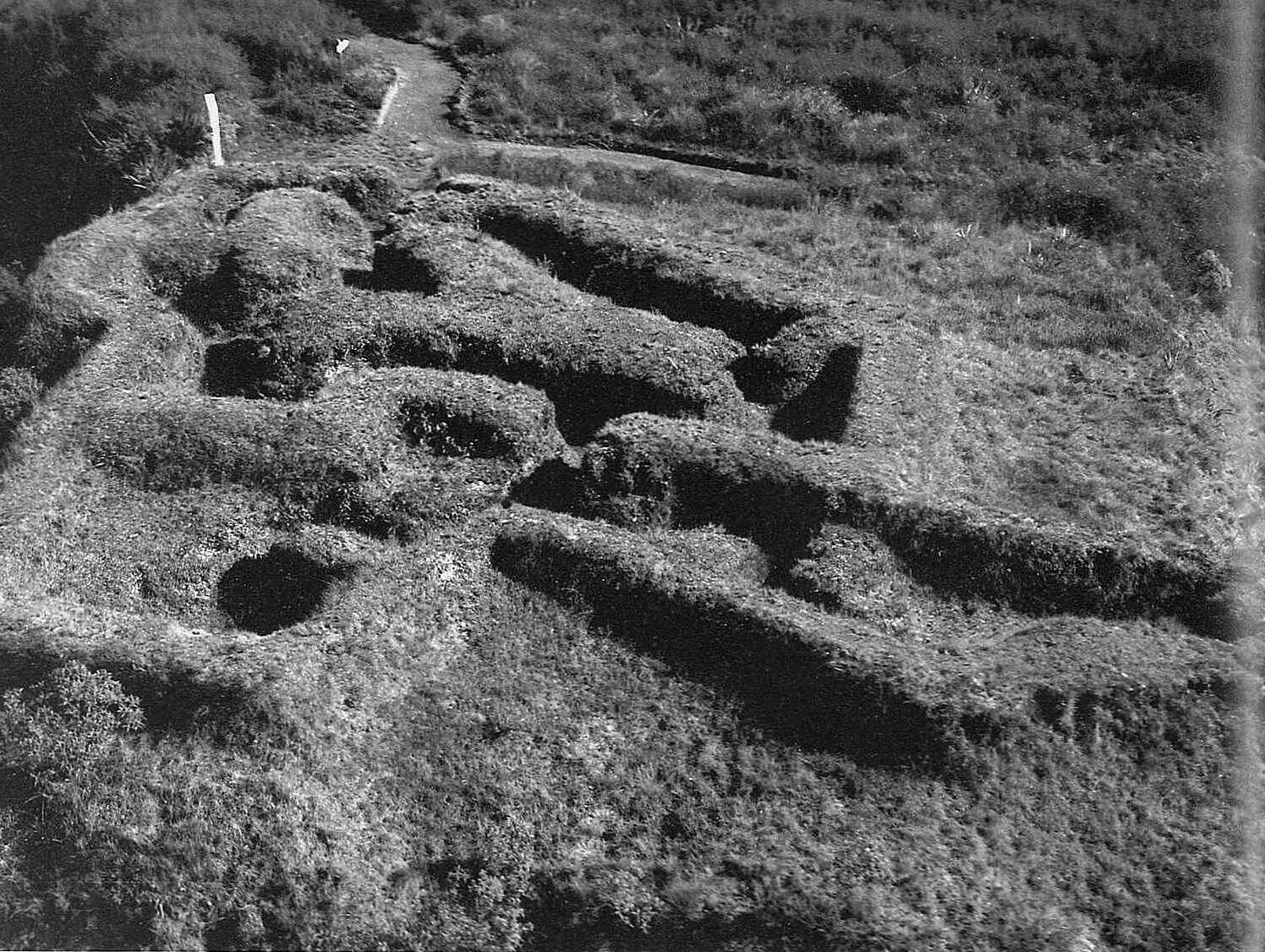
A view of the lower redoubt; this was quickly captured by the attacking government and kūpapa forces in the early stages of the fighting

== Battle ==
At 10:00am, having decided to deal with the approaching Ringatū skirmishers and attack Te Pōrere, McDonnell dispersed his forces. Keepa's men was placed on the left flank along with the majority of the Armed Constabulary and about 100 of the Kahungunu kūpapa. This party, tasked with dealing with the skirmishers, was commanded by Lieutenant Colonel Jasper Herrick, of the Armed Constabulary, although Keepa actually led the men in the attack. On the right flank McDonnell placed himself, the balance of the Armed Constabulary, the Te Arawa kūpapa, the Tūwharetoa party and the remaining 120 Kahungunu kūpapa. Herrick's party was to deal with the outlying rifle pit and any skirmishers therein, before pushing onto the upper redoubt. McDonnell meanwhile was to attack the lower redoubt, and then link up with Herrick at the upper redoubt.

Keepa's Whanganui force was the first of the attackers to engage Te Kooti's skirmishers, who opened fire. Disregarding this, the Whanganui kūpapa continued to advance, holding their fire until they were closer to their opponents. The Ringatū retreated back to the upper redoubt. Some Ringatū, led by Te Heuheu Horonuku, were in the bush line adjacent the line of advance of the left flanking party and opened fire. A force was detached from the latter to deal with these Ringatū, who were actually those recruited from Tūwharetoa. They withdrew from the field and Keepa's men continued up to the upper redoubt.

Meanwhile, St George's Te Arawa kūpapa and the Kahungunu contingent allocated to the right flank engaged with the Ringatū on the banks of the Whanganui River, pushing past the rifle pit, fording the river itself and going onto the lower redoubt. Several Ringatū were killed here before the position was cleared and the right flanking party moved up to the upper redoubt. As they moved forward, St George ordered Preece, leading the Te Arawa kūpapa, to veer away to the right and move alongside that side of the upper redoubt. St George was killed, shot through the head, as he closed up to the fortification. In subsequent years, Peita Kotuku, one of Te Kooti's lieutenants, claimed to have fired the fatal shot.

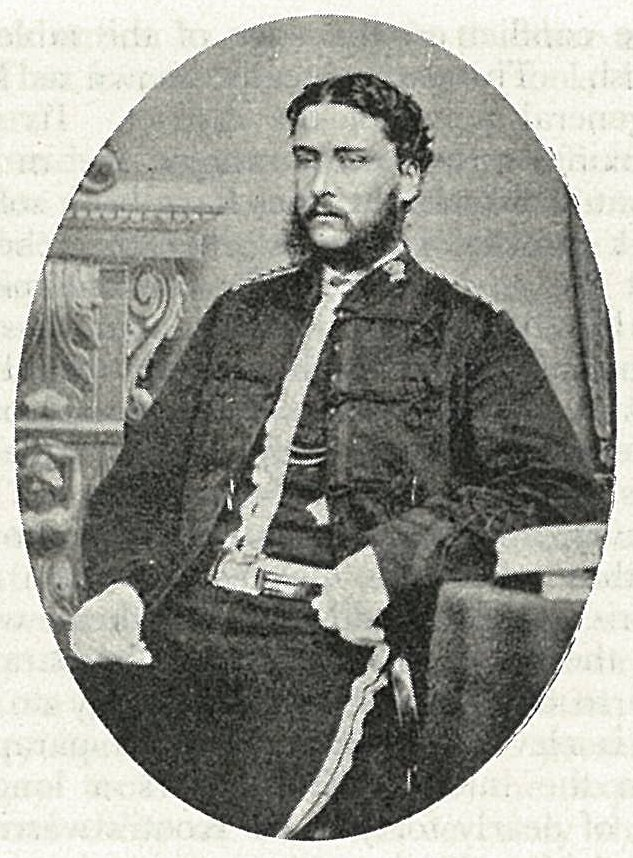
Captain John St George, killed during the attack on Te Kooti at Te Pōrere

The upper redoubt, and Te Kooti, were now surrounded on three sides. However, the northern side was exposed to gunfire from Te Kooti's men disposed in the neighbouring bush which prevented the attackers from gaining a foothold there. Additionally, some Ringatū were positioned on elevated ground to the west and directed some gunfire on that side of the redoubt. Despite this the attackers were able to locate themselves in the ditch surrounding the redoubt. Once there, they were relatively safe from its defenders who were unable, due to the angle of the loop holes, to fire directly into the ditch. Instead, Te Kooti's men had to aim their weapons over the walls but this exposed them to the gunfire of the attackers.

The attackers blocked up the loop holes with lumps of pumice and debris and worked to dig out the underside of the walls. Before long, they ascended the walls in order to fire directly into the redoubt. The defenders began to abandon the position, making their way out via the access point on the western wall and escaping into the bush. Led by the Whanganui kūpapa, the government forces then began moving into the interior of the redoubt. Te Kooti, who was protected by a number of female followers, was wounded in the hand as he escaped; one of his fingers was severed entirely. Once the redoubt was breached, all of Te Kooti's men still present within were killed, either by being shot or bayoneted. The Ringatū were pursued into the bush and some prisoners were taken.

== Aftermath ==
At least 37 of Te Kooti's warriors were killed at Te Pōrere and over 20 prisoners were taken. The most strenuous of the defenders had been some of the women, and several had severe wounds. Only one prisoner, Te Wiripo Tohiraukura, of the Tūwharetoa iwi, was male. The Ringatū dead, 37 in total, were buried within the upper redoubt. (Note: The government claimed that 52 Ringatū had been killed, on the basis of having found this number of bodies after the fighting. However, only 37 were known to be interred at Te Pōrere.) Of the attackers, four, including St George, were killed and four wounded. One of the latter was Rēnata Kawepō, a leader of the Kahungunu, who lost an eye in hand-to-hand combat that occurred during the final stages of the fighting.

Using the captured Te Wiripo as a mediator, the government secured the surrender of Te Heuheu Horonuku a few days later. His argument that he only followed Te Kooti under duress was accepted on face value. Several of the Tūwharetoa women prisoners alleged that they had been hostages of Te Kooti, incentivising the men to fight. The government, keen to cut off support for Te Kooti in the Taupo area, treated Horonuku and other Tūwharetoa leniently.

The Battle of Te Pōrere was the last time Te Kooti fought from a prepared defensive position. It also marked the last major engagement of the New Zealand Wars. Te Kooti continued elude his kūpapa pursuers by moving westwards and in January 1870 he reached the village of Tapapa, in the south Waikato. He evaded the government's attempt to capture him there and after further skirmishes, went back into the Te Urewera ranges. For the next two years, he and his followers were hunted by kūpapa of Ngāti Porou, Te Arawa, Whanganui and Kahungunu. Eventually in May 1872 he was granted safety in the King Country. Ten years later, legislation was introduced that allowed for Maori that had fought against the government on political grounds to be pardoned. Te Kooti was granted a pardon and allowed to leave the King Country to spread his gospel, although he never returned to Poverty Bay due to opposition from the locals, both settlers and Maori.

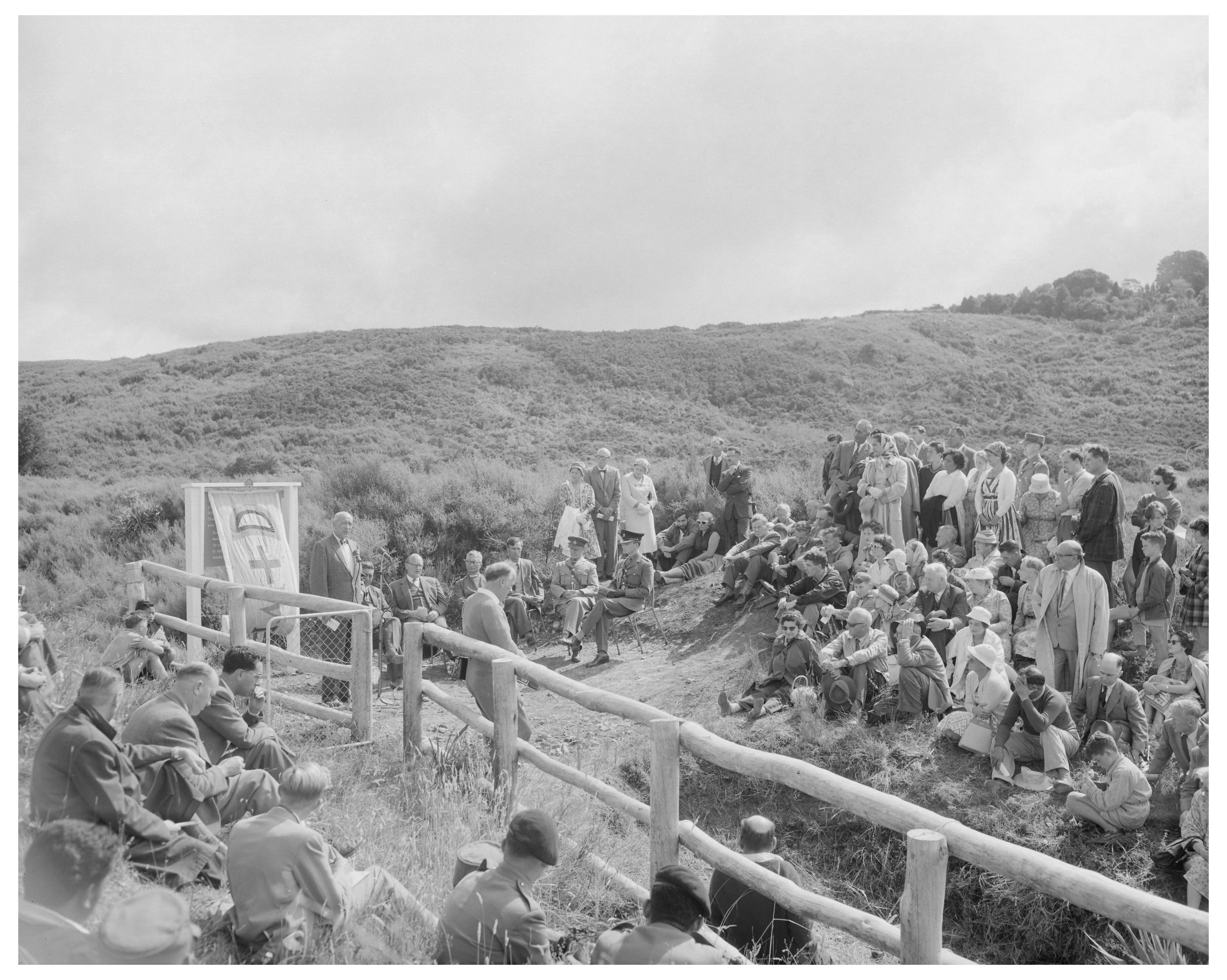
The ceremony at which the site of the Battle of Te Pōrere was declared to be a National Historic Place

The land on which the Battle of Te Pōrere took place was declared to be a National Historic Place on 18 February 1961 and is now a historic reserve administered by Heritage New Zealand. Both the upper redoubt and the lower fortification were reconstructed and are considered to be the best preserved pā site in New Zealand, although not the best example due to not being representative of a traditional pā.
