= George Preece =

New Zealand Armed Constabulary officer

George Augustus Preece NZC
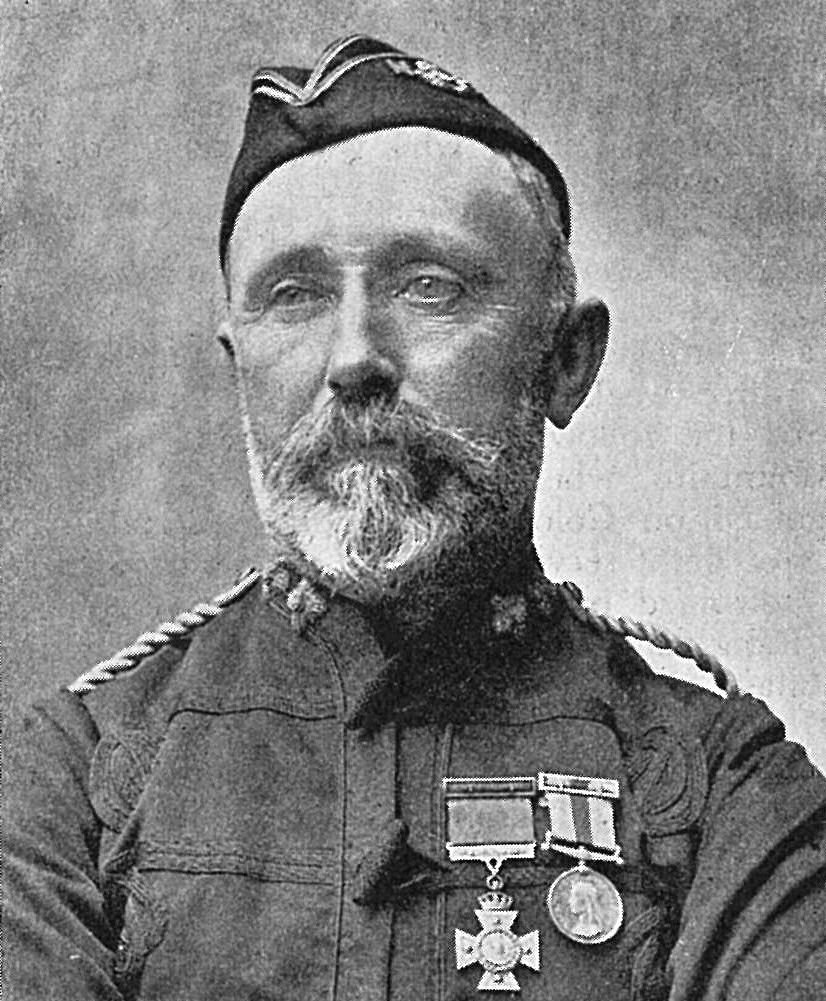
- Born: c. 1845; Coromandel, New Zealand
- Died: 10 July 1925; Palmerston North, New Zealand
- Military career
- Allegiance: British Empire
- Branch: Armed Constabulary
- Service years: 1865–1866; 1868–1876
- Rank: Sub-inspector
- Commands: Arawa Flying Column No. 2
- Campaigns: New Zealand Wars; East Cape War; Te Kooti's War; Siege of Ngatapa; Tītokowaru's War
- Awards: New Zealand Cross
- Other work: Magistrate; Businessman

George Augustus Preece NZC (c. 1845 – 10 July 1925) was an officer in New Zealand's Armed Constabulary who rose to prominence during Te Kooti's War. He was awarded the New Zealand Cross for his actions during the siege of Ngatapa.

The son of a Church Missionary Society worker, Preece was born at Coromandel in New Zealand. Able to speak the Māori language he worked as an interpreter during legal proceedings and then, during the East Cape War, for the military. Following the outbreak of Te Kooti's War in 1868, he became an officer in the Armed Constabulary and was heavily involved in the pursuit of Te Kooti, a militant Māori religious leader. In 1870 he was given command of a force of Armed Constabulary of Te Arawa Māori and led this for the next two years in expeditions in the rugged Urewera ranges, hoping to capture Te Kooti. In 1876 he became a magistrate and several years later a businessman in Palmerston North. He died there in 1925, aged 80.

== Early life ==
George Augustus Preece was born in c. 1845 at Coromandel, New Zealand, to James Preece, a missionary, and his wife Mary Ann née Williams. His father, who arrived in New Zealand in 1829, was part of the Church Missionary Society and based at mission stations in the area around the Firth of Thames. Preece was raised at Ahikeruru and became well versed in te reo, the Māori language. In 1864, he was employed at the magistrate's court in Wairoa as a clerk and interpreter.

The following year, the East Cape War broke out. This war was one of a series of conflicts in New Zealand between some local Māori people on one side, and British imperial and colonial forces and their Māori allies on the other. These clashes are collectively termed the New Zealand Wars. Preece was attached to a contingent, commanded by Colonel James Fraser, of the Colonial Defence Force as an interpreter and served in this capacity until the end of the war in 1866, at which time he returned to his legal career.

== Te Kooti's War ==
In July 1868, Te Kooti's War, another conflict of the New Zealand Wars, broke out. Te Kooti was a Māori warrior of the Rongowhakaata iwi (tribe) who in 1865 had fought on the side of the New Zealand government against the Pai Mārire religious movement during the East Cape War in Poverty Bay. He was later deemed to be a spy and was exiled without a trial to the Chatham Islands along with 200 Pai Mārire warriors and their families. He became their leader and in July 1868 escaped captivity with his followers, landing back in Poverty Bay in July 1868, triggering what was subsequently known as Te Kooti's War.

At the start of Te Kooti's War, Preece assisted in raising a force of volunteers to combat Te Kooti. He was part of a party that skirmished with Te Kooti's followers on 24 July. The volunteers had to retreat and Preece formed part of the rearguard that successfully covered the withdrawal. He was subsequently commissioned into the Armed Constabulary. This was a paramilitary law enforcement agency that formed New Zealand's main defence force at the time and which was led by Colonel George Whitmore. He participated in the pursuit of Te Kooti and was present at engagements with Te Kooti's forces in late July.

=== Attack at Ngatapa ===
Following a massacre carried out by Te Kooti in October of colonists in Poverty Bay, Preece was promoted to lieutenant and was given command of a force of around 170 Ngāti Kahungunu warriors from Wairoa, which he led in pursuit of Te Kooti. At Makaretu, a pā (hillfort) where Te Kooti positioned a rearguard, Preece and his men linked up with a contingent of Ngāti Porou kūpapa—Māori who were aligned with the government— commanded by Ropata Wahawaha. On 3 December they mounted an attack and defeated Te Kooti's rearguard. However, Te Kooti and the bulk of his forces had withdrawn undetected to a nearby pā at Ngatapa.

Together with Ropata's men, Preece and his Wairoa warriors attacked Ngatapa the next day. They were able to make it up close to the pā and during the course of the afternoon small groups of warriors were able to join them. Eventually, they breached the outer defensive trench. As night fell, more reinforcements joined them but ammunition was low. Ropata requested some be brought up, but night had fallen and no one wanted to make the climb up in the dark. Ropata and Preece abandoned the position early the following morning as their men had run out of ammunition. They then withdrew from Ngatapa altogether, fatigued from the marching and fighting of the past several days, and retreated to Tūranga. For their actions at Ngatapa, Ropata and Preece were subsequently awarded the New Zealand Cross (NZC), the recommendation coming from Whitmore. The NZC had recently been established as a gallantry award for colonial personnel, and was regarded as being equivalent to a Victoria Cross (VC); those serving in New Zealand's colonial militia were ineligible for the VC unless they were under the command of British officers.

Ngatapa was besieged by Whitmore's Armed Constabulary and allied kūpapa at the end of the month and the pā fell on 5 January 1869. Te Kooti, who lost about half of his men in the engagement, escaped along with the surviving warriors. This negated the threat of Te Kooti for the short term, allowing Whitmore to focus on another prominent Māori warrior fighting against the colonial forces: Tītokowaru, in the South Taranaki. Whitmore transferred his Armed Constabulary to South Taranaki, and Preece, who would be mentioned in despatches on multiple occasions, served with him in the campaign against Tītokowaru.

=== Pursuit of Te Kooti ===
Te Kooti reemerged as a threat on the East Coast with raids on population centres in March and April 1869, prompting Whitmore, who had suppressed Tītokowaru's forces in South Taranaki to return to the region with his Armed Constabulary. Te Kooti, along with his followers, was sheltering in the rugged Urewera ranges with the support of the Tūhoe iwi. Whitmore mounted an invasion of the Urewera in May, with Preece on his staff as interpreter. Te Kooti avoided capture by escaping to the Taupō region, to the west, in June.

Lieutenant Colonel Thomas McDonnell led a force of Armed Constabulary and kūpapa to Taupō in August, seeking out Te Kooti and his followers. Preece was one of the officers in charge of a contingent of kūpapa from the Te Arawa iwi. There were skirmishes with Te Kooti in the following weeks. On 25 September Preece led a successful charge against a party of Te Kooti's followers that were dug in at Te Pononga and had fired upon some scouts. He was personally commended by McDonnell for his efforts. He was present at the Battle of Te Pōrere on 4 October, which was a major defeat for Te Kooti although he again managed to escape, eventually making it back to the Urewera ranges. Preece meanwhile, now the senior officer leading the Te Arawa kūpapa, continued to campaign and engage in minor skirmishes with Te Kooti's warriors in the region until early 1870.

Promoted to captain, Preece was given command of a force of Armed Constabulary of Te Arawa in March 1870. His force, known as Arawa Flying Column No. 2, was one of two parties that would be active in the Urewera ranges from 1870 to 1872. Operating from a base at Te Teko he and his 90 men patrolled the western edges of the Ureweras in the hopes of capturing Te Kooti. His force fired the last shots of the New Zealand Wars on 14 February 1872, when they caught sight of Te Kooti and a party of his men and pursued them for a distance up the Waiau Valley. Preece and his men were withdrawn from the field three months later after Te Kooti found shelter in the King Country with the forces of the Māori King Movement.

== Later life ==
Promoted to sub-inspector, Preece continued to serve in the Armed Constabulary until May 1876 at which time he became a magistrate at Ōpōtiki. He subsequently fulfilled similar roles in Napier and Christchurch. In 1892 he retired from the judiciary and became a businessman. He moved to Palmerston North, where he died on 10 July 1925. He was survived by his wife and four children.
