= List of wars involving New Zealand =

This might be a list of wars involving New Zealand. New Zealand has participated in many armed conflicts, often alongside its allies such as the United Kingdom.

New Zealand victory
New Zealand defeat
Another result (e.g. a treaty or peace without a clear result, status quo ante bellum, result of civil or internal conflict, result unknown or indecisive, inconclusive)
Ongoing conflict

== List ==
=== Colonial New Zealand (1841–1907) ===
Conflict	New Zealand	Opposing Combatant	Result	Casualties
Flagstaff War (1845–1846) The bombardment of Ruapekapeka, January 1846.	British Empire: United Kingdom; New South Wales; Colony of New Zealand; Māori Kupapa	Māori	Inconclusive: Kawiti and Heke's rebellion defeated; British claimed a tactical victory; British negotiate peace with Kawiti in 1846; British negotiate peace with Heke in 1848.	60–94 killed
First Taranaki War (1860–1861) British troops defending their positions during the Battle of Waireka.	British Empire: New South Wales; Colony of New Zealand	Taranaki Māori Kīngitanga	Ceasefire: Truce agreed to after the surrender of the Te Ārei pā; Waikato Invasion plans made; Māori remained in possession of the European-owned; Tātaraimaka	200 killed and wounded
Second Taranaki War (1863–1866)	British Empire: New South Wales; Colony of New Zealand	Taranaki Māori	Inconclusive: Tribes either surrendered or withdrew towards the mountain.	~34 killed
Waikato Wars (1863–1864) Ngāti Maniapoto survivors of the war, at the jubilee gathering on the battlefield of Orakau, 1 April 1914. All but Hekiera shared in the defence of Orakau pa, and fought through to the Puniu River in the retreat.	British Empire: New South Wales; Colony of New Zealand	Kīngitanga North Island allies	Victory: Kingite power crushed; Waikato Māori expelled south of the Waikato River.; Occupation and settlement of European colonists on conquered land	1000 killed and wounded
East Cape War (1865–1866)	British Empire: Colony of New Zealand; Arawa Ngāti Porou Ngāti Kahungunu	Whakatohea Māori Urewera Māori Ngai Tama Māori	Victory––––––––––––––––––––––––	35 killed
Titokowaru's War (1868–1869) The death of Gustavus von Tempsky at Te Ngutu o Te Manu by Tītokowaru's forces.	British Empire: United Kingdom; New South Wales; Colony of New Zealand; Māori Kupapa	Ngāti Ruanui Iwi Ngāruahine tribes	Victory: Ngāti Ruanui and Ngaruahine withdrawal	11 killed
Te Kooti's War (1868–1872) Poverty Bay Massacre (Battles of the nineteenth century, no. 3, 1901).	British Empire: United Kingdom; New South Wales; Colony of New Zealand; Māori Kupapa Ngāti Porou Ngāti Kahungunu	Māori Iwis: Ngāi Tūhoe; Ngati Hineuru; Rongowhakaata; Ringatū adherents Pai Mārire adherents	Victory: End of New Zealand Wars; Territory ceded by Māori iwi	~60 killed
Second Boer War (1899–1902) The first contingent of New Zealand soldiers embarking for South Africa, October 1899.	British Empire: United Kingdom; Canada; Australia; Colony of New Zealand; India; Ceylon; Cape Colony; Natal Colony; Rhodesia	Orange Free State; South African Republic	Victory: British sovereignty over the Orange Free State and the Transvaal in accordance with the Treaty of Vereeniging	230 killed
Boxer Rebellion (1900–1901)	British Empire: United Kingdom; Canada; Australia; Colony of New Zealand; India; Japan; Russia; France; United States; Germany; Austria-Hungary; Italy	Yihetuan; Qing China	Victory Boxer Protocol: Anti-foreign societies banned in China	?

=== New Zealand (1907–Present) ===
Conflict	New Zealand	Opposing Combatant	Result	Casualties
World War I (1914–1918) New Zealand WWI Troops in Trench - Front line of the Somme.	France; British Empire: United Kingdom; Canada; Newfoundland; Australia; New Zealand; India; South Africa; Russia; United States; Italy; Serbia; Montenegro; Belgium; Japan; China; Romania; Portugal; Brazil; Hejaz; Greece; Armenia (Saudi Arabia) Nejd and Hasa (Thailand) Siam	Germany; Austria-Hungary; Ottoman Empire; Bulgaria	Victory: End of the German, Russian, Ottoman, and Austro-Hungarian empires; Formation of new countries in Europe and the Middle East; Transfer of German colonies and regions of the former Ottoman Empire to other powers; Establishment of the League of Nations	16,711 to 18,060 killed
Armenian–Azerbaijani War (1918–1920)	FR Armenia; RM Armenia; British Empire: United Kingdom; Canada; Australia; New Zealand; Centrocaspian Dictatorship	Azerbaijan; Ottoman Empire Russian SFSR (Turkey) Turkish Revolutionaries; Azerbaijan SSR	Defeat: Sovietization of Armenia and Azerbaijan; Disputes over Karabakh and Nakhichevan settled in favor of Soviet Azerbaijan; Zangezur gained by Soviet Armenia	?
World War II (1939–1945) Members of the 28th Battalion performing a haka, Egypt (July 1941).	United States; Soviet Union; United Kingdom; China; France; Poland; Yugoslavia; Greece; Netherlands; Belgium; Luxembourg; Denmark; Norway; Czechoslovakia; Canada; Australia; New Zealand; India; South Africa; Philippines; Ethiopia; Brazil; Mexico; Mongolia	Germany; Japan; Italy; Hungary; Romania; Bulgaria; Slovakia; Croatia; Finland; Iraq; Thailand	Victory: Collapse of the Third Reich; Fall of Japanese and Italian Empires; Creation of the United Nations; Emergence of the United States and the Soviet Union as superpowers; Beginning of the Cold War	11,700 killed
Malayan Emergency (1948–1960)	United Kingdom: Federation of Malaya; Southern Rhodesia; Rhodesia and Nyasaland; Fiji; Australia; New Zealand	MCP: MRLA	Victory: Chin Peng exiled from Malaya	15 killed
Korean War (1950–1953) New Zealand gunners providing artillery support for Australian forces across the Imjin River, April 1951.	South Korea; United States; United Kingdom; Canada; Australia; New Zealand; Turkey; Philippines; Thailand; Ethiopia; Greece; France; Colombia; Belgium; South Africa; Netherlands; Luxembourg	North Korea; China; Soviet Union	Ceasefire: North Korean invasions of South Korea repelled; United Nations invasion of North Korea repelled; Chinese–North Korean–Soviet invasion of South Korea repelled; Korean Armistice Agreement signed; Korean Demilitarized Zone established	45 killed
Borneo Confrontation (1963–1966)	Malaysia; Singapore; United Kingdom; Australia; New Zealand	Indonesia	Victory: Suharto replaced Sukarno as the Supreme Commander of the Indonesian Armed Forces; Normalisation of diplomatic relationship; Indonesia accepts the formation of Malaysia; Peace treaty	12 killed
Vietnam War (1965–1973) New Zealand soldier with an Australian M113 in South Vietnam during 1968.	South Vietnam; United States; South Korea; Australia; New Zealand; Thailand; Philippines; Laos; Cambodia; Khmer Republic	North Vietnam (Provisional Revolutionary Government of the Republic of South Vietnam) Viet Cong (Laos) Pathet Lao (Cambodia) Khmer Rouge; China; Soviet Union; North Korea	Defeat: Withdrawal of American forces from Indochina in 1973; Dissolution of the Republic of Vietnam; Communist governments take power in South Vietnam, Laos and Cambodia in 1975; South Vietnam is annexed by North Vietnam	37 killed
Gulf War (1990–1991)	Kuwait; United States; United Kingdom; Saudi Arabia; France; Canada; Egypt; Syria; Qatar; New Zealand	Iraq	Victory: Iraqi withdrawal from Kuwait; Emir Jaber III restored; Sanctions against Iraq; Heavy casualties and destruction of Iraqi and Kuwaiti infrastructure; Establishment of Iraqi no-fly zones	?
War in Afghanistan (2001–2021) Two members of the New Zealand Provincial Reconstruction Team provide security in Shebar district, Bamyan province, July 23.	Afghanistan; ISAF: United States; United Kingdom; Canada; Australia; New Zealand; Germany; France; Italy; Georgia; Poland; Romania; Turkey	Taliban al-Qaeda; IMU; HI-Gulbuddin; HI-Khalis; Haqqani network Lashkar-e-Taiba; JeM; ETIM; TTP; IEW; TNSM; IJU Islamic Emirate of Afghanistan	Defeat: Initial defeat of the Taliban government in Afghanistan; Destruction of al-Qaeda camps; Killing of Osama bin Laden; Long running Taliban insurgency; Taliban resurgence in 2021 culminating in the Fall of Kabul (2021); Fall of the Islamic Republic of Afghanistan and re-instalment of Islamic Emirate of Afghanistan	10 killed
Iraq War (2003–2004)	Iraq; Iraqi Kurdistan; United States; United Kingdom; South Korea; Italy; Poland; Australia; New Zealand; Georgia; Ukraine; Netherlands; Spain; Romania; Bulgaria; Denmark; Thailand	SCJL; Naqshbandi Army ISI al-Qaeda; Ansar al-Islam; IAI Mahdi Army; Badr Brigades; Kata'ib Hezbollah Ba'athist Iraq	Victory: Invasion and occupation of Iraq; Overthrow of Ba'ath Party government; Execution of Saddam Hussein; Iraqi insurgency, emergence of al-Qaeda in Iraq, and sectarian violence; Subsequent reduction in violence and depletion of al-Qaeda in Iraq; Establishment of parliamentary democracy and formation of new Shia-led government; Withdrawal of U.S. forces from Iraq in 2011	?
East Timorese Crisis (2006–2013) A New Zealand ISF soldier patrols Dili on polling day. Support for candidate Horta is displayed in background.	Australia; New Zealand; Malaysia; Portugal; East Timor	(Timor-Leste) FTDL Rebels	Victory: Violence ends	5 killed
War on ISIL (2014–present)	United States; Iraq; United Kingdom; Canada; Jordan; Morocco; Australia; Belgium; Denmark; France; Germany; Italy; Netherlands; New Zealand; Norway; Portugal; Spain; Bahrain; Saudi Arabia; United Arab Emirates; Egypt	Islamic State of Iraq and the Levant; Boko Haram al-Qaeda	Ongoing: Coalition airstrikes on ISIL and al-Qaeda affiliates positions in Iraq, Syria, Libya, and Nigeria; Multinational humanitarian effort conducted by various nations.; ISIL loses 30% of its territory in Iraq; Over 350 Christians are in ISIL captivity.; Hundreds of thousands of civilians in Iraq and Syria flee from their homes to escape advancing ISIL forces.; Thousands of Syrian and Iraqi civilians killed by ISIL forces.; Boko Haram joins ISIL, establishing a presence in Nigeria and surrounding African countries.; Arming and support for Iraq and the Syrian Opposition along with various militias opposed to ISIL.; ISIL controls over 50% of Syria by May 2015.; ISIL presence in Afghanistan, Pakistan, Yemen and the Philippines.	?

== See also ==
- Military history of New Zealand
