= Thomas Adamson (soldier) =

New Zealand soldier and farmer (1845–1913)

Thomas Adamson NZC
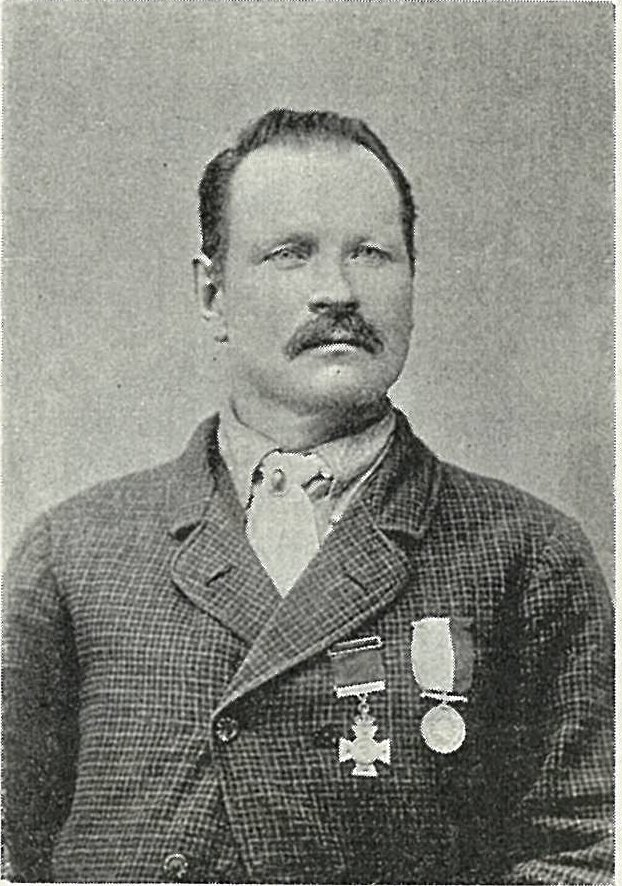
- Born: 9 September 1845; Whanganui, New Zealand
- Died: 30 December 1913 (aged 68); Whanganui, New Zealand
- Burial place: Heads Road Cemetery, Whanganui
- Military career
- Allegiance: British Empire
- Units: Wanganui Militia; Wanganui Cavalry Volunteers; Corps of Guides
- Conflicts: New Zealand Wars: Tītokowaru's War; Te Kooti's War

Thomas Adamson NZC (9 September 1845 – 29 December 1913) was a New Zealand yeoman soldier, awarded New Zealand Cross in 1876.

== Life ==
Born in Wanganui, New Zealand in 1845, Adamson was celebrated for his skill and hardihood in bush scouting and warfare after the Maori manner, and was awarded the New Zealand Cross in recognition of several daring expeditions in Hauhau country. He served with Kepa's Wanganui Maori Contingent and in Whitmore's Corps of Guides 1869–70, and was wounded at Manawa-hiwi Urewera Country on 7 May 1869.

== See also ==
- New Zealand Cross
