= Ben Biddle =

New Zealand Cross recipient

Ben Biddle NZC
- Born: Benedict Benjamin Biddle; 24 October 1843; Auckland, New Zealand
- Died: 10 March 1933 (aged 89); Whakatāne, New Zealand
- Burial place: Domain Road Cemetery, Whakatāne
- Military career
- Allegiance: British Empire
- Rank: Constable
- Conflicts: New Zealand Wars

Benedict Benjamin Biddle NZC (24 October 1843 – 10 March 1933) was a constable in the Armed Constabulary during the New Zealand Wars. He was awarded the New Zealand Cross for his acts of bravery at Ngātapa Pā, Gisborne, in January 1869. Biddle was among the first to receive the award and was the last of its 23 recipients to die.

== Origins ==
Biddle was born in Auckland, New Zealand, on 24 October 1843, the son of an English regular soldier, Edward Biddle, and his wife Anne Leach. The Biddles were originally from Alveston, Gloucestershire, England, before migrating on the settlers' ship, the Katherine Stewart Forbes on 1 February 1841, arriving in New Zealand in June that year. Ben grew up on the shores of the Waitemata Harbour and worked on Captain Jones' cutters as a youngster, sailing between Auckland and the Bay of Plenty. Following his time at sea, he worked on a cattle farm where he broke in horses.

== New Zealand land wars ==
As a 21-year-old, Biddle enlisted in the New Zealand Colonial Forces as a constable in the 1st Division of the Armed Constabulary (Military Police). He soon saw action and was involved in a number of notable conflicts. According to Cowan: "He made a name in the Hauhau wars for his enterprise and disregard of danger. He was sometimes in trouble with military officers who had incurred his contempt by their ignorance of bush warfare or their excessive caution, but when men were needed for the fighting line the call was always for Biddle and men of his kind."

=== Siege of Ngātapa ===
Following their defeat at Makaretu on 3 December 1868, Te Kooti and his followers withdrew to an ancient Māori pā, named Ngātapa, northwest of Gisborne, where they made a stand against the colonial forces and the kupapa (colonial-aligned Māori). Ngātapa was a single cone-shaped mountain and was around 2,000 feet high with two sharp cliffs to the sides and a narrow precipice to the rear of the mountain.

On 5 December, an attempt to storm the pā was commanded by Major Wahawaha and Lieutenant Preece, but they were not successful owing to a lack of ammunition and the defection of a number of men.

On 24 December, Colonel Whitmore set out from Patutahi with a stronger and better prepared force of men, including the Armed Constabulary. By 31 December, Whitmore's men had gained a position on the same ridge as the pā and two days later, began their assault upon Ngātapa. The colonial forces and the kupapa attempted to take the pā but Te Kooti's men succeeded in slowing them down and Whitmore ordered an artillery bombardment on the pā. The colonial and kupapa forces had only enough men to surround three of the four sides of the pā, but believed that this was adequate as the fourth side was a 200-foot cliff and that it was not possible for Te Kooti's forces to escape in that direction.

In the late hours of 4 January and early hours of 5 January, Te Kooti and a large number of his party escaped by tying blankets and flax ropes together and letting themselves down the unguarded section of cliff. After the pā was taken and a short pursuit was mounted, a number of Hauhau were stripped, shot and thrown from the cliffs atop Ngātapa. Te Kooti had escaped and would go on to cause more havoc for the colonial forces.

Biddle's citation reads:

For his gallant conduct at the siege of Ngatapa, in January, 1869. The rear of the enemy's position was assigned to the attack under Major Fraser, consisting of Nos 1 and 3 Armed Constabulary and Hotene's Ngatiporous. The extreme right, on a scarped stony ridge, was commanded from the enemy's rifle-pits and works, and lodgement was only effected by cutting out standing room with a pick axe. The enemy made several determined sorties against this point, and it became extremely difficult to maintain the position - which was essential to the success of the operations. A party of twelve Volunteers were at length placed there, and they succeeded, with some loss, in holding the position till the end of the siege, and in repelling several resolute attacks. One of the most conspicuous for his bravery was Constable Biddle.

== Marriage and post war ==
While serving in the land wars, Biddle married a Māori woman, Mauri Poiakino (Pakohai), who was of Ngāi Tūhoe and Ngāti Pāhauwera origins. Mauri accompanied her husband on a number of his military missions, acting as both a guide and cook.

Following the land wars, Biddle and Mauri had a large family and lived in Wainui in the Bay of Plenty, an odd location as Biddle's nemesis, Te Kooti, resided and built his marae there. One of Biddle's sons, Robert (Rapata) Biddle, become a minister and secretary within the Ringatū Church, set up by Te Kooti. Robert Biddle also designed the Ringatū crest or logo in 1926.

Although Ben Biddle found himself at odds with some of his superior officers and faced a court martial on one occasion, he got his own back by naming his most troublesome bullock Lambert after his equally troublesome former officer, Colonel Lambert.

Biddle died in Whakatāne on 10 March 1933. He was the last surviving holder of the New Zealand Cross.
