= Henare Kepa Te Ahururu =

New Zealand troop in Tītokowaru's War

Henare Kepa NZC
- Born: Henare Kepa Te Ahururu
- Other name: Henare Kepa Te Ahuru
- Military career
- Allegiance: British Empire
- Rank: Constable
- Units: 1st Division, Armed Constabulary
- Conflicts: New Zealand Wars: Tītokowaru's War

Henare Kepa Te Ahururu NZC was a constable in the Armed Constabulary who was awarded the New Zealand Cross for his gallant conduct during the attack at Moturoa during Tītokowaru's War.

== New Zealand Cross ==
Kepa was awarded the New Zealand Cross for his actions on 7 November 1868 at Moturoa. Under command of Te Keepa Te Rangihiwinui, his company attempted to find an entrance to Moturoa Pā to infiltrate it. Unable to get a clear view, "Constable Kepa climbed to the top of the palisades erected around the fortifications to reconnoiter the position, and in doing so was shot through the lungs, yet he nevertheless walked out of action and brought his arms into camp".
