= Rowley Hill (soldier) =

Rowley Hill NZC
- Born: George Rowland Hill; 1836–1837; Devon, England
- Died: 15 February 1930 (aged 93); Auckland, New Zealand
- Burial place: O'Neills Point Cemetery, Bayswater, Auckland
- Military career
- Allegiance: British Empire
- Branch: Royal Navy; Armed Constabulary
- Service years: 1851–1897
- Units: Forest Rangers; 1st Division, Armed Constabulary
- Conflicts: Crimean War; Siege of Sevastopol (1854–1855); Indian Rebellion of 1857; Siege of Lucknow; New Zealand Wars; Invasion of the Waikato; East Cape War; Tītokowaru's War; Te Kooti's War
- Awards: Baltic Medal; Crimea Medal; Turkish Crimea Medal; Indian Mutiny Medal; New Zealand War Medal

George Rowland Hill NZC (c. 1837 – 15 February 1930) was a British sailor and soldier who was awarded the New Zealand Cross for his actions at Mohaka during Te Kooti's War. Throughout the Crimean War, he served in the Royal Navy, obtaining the Sebastopol bar before having involvement in the Expedition of the Thousand while serving on board HMS Hannibal. After jumping ship near Auckland, Hill fell in with Von Tempsky's Forest Rangers in 1863, serving with them until joining the Armed Constabulary.
