= John Mackintosh Roberts =

New Zealand soldier, resident magistrate and administrator

John Mackintosh Roberts NZC (31 December 1840 – 12 October 1928) was a New Zealand soldier, resident magistrate and administrator.

John Mackintosh Roberts was born in the city of Bombay, India, on 31 December 1840, the eldest child of George Roberts and Mary née Mackintosh. His father was an official in the Supreme Court of India, who died in 1844. This left Roberts and a sister, just an infant at the time, to be raised by his mother. An aunt soon joined the family in India but they eventually moved to Inverness in Scotland. Here Roberts attended the Royal Academy. The family, which included Robert's aunt and her husband, who she had met in India, migrated to New Zealand in late 1855, aboard the Carnatic.

On 12 March 1872 in a ceremony at Cambridge, Roberts married Jessie née Clare, who was his cousin. Her father, Robert's uncle by marriage, was an officer in the New Zealand militia.

After seeing considerable action across the North Island in the New Zealand wars, Roberts was appointed commander of the new New Zealand Permanent Militia in February 1887. After retiring as a soldier in 1888, he was a magistrate in Masterton and Tauranga and two Royal Commissions.

Roberts died on 11 October 1928 in Rotorua at the age of 88. Buried in the Tauranga cemetery, he was survived by two sons and two daughters. His wife had predeceased him several years previously.
