= Frank Mace =

New Zealand settler and soldier

Frank Mace NZC
- Born: Francis Joseph Mace c. 1837; Madeira, Portugal
- Died: 7 August 1927; Ōakura, Taranaki, New Zealand
- Burial place: Okato Cemetery
- Military career
- Allegiance: British Empire
- Branch: New Zealand Military Forces
- Rank: Captain
- Unit: Taranaki Mounted Volunteers
- Conflicts: New Zealand Wars
- Awards: New Zealand Cross

Francis Joseph Mace NZC (c. 1837 – 7 August 1927) was a Taranaki settler whose exploits during the Taranaki Wars earned him much praise. Chief among his awards was the New Zealand Cross, the highest colonial gallantry award available in New Zealand.

== Military career ==
Mace's military career began in the Taranaki Rifle Volunteers. At the Battle of Waireka on 28 March 1860 Mace's service as a dispatch rider drew a lot of attention. In July 1862 he was given a presentation revolver for his services during the battle. His bravery in numerous other engagements was widely acknowledged.

== New Zealand Cross ==
Mace was presented with a New Zealand Cross on 23 January 1877. He eventually gifted his cross to New Plymouth Museum (now Puke Ariki) in 1927 and it was termed a "rare and valuable addition" to the collection.

== Civilian life ==
After the war Mace took an active part in the community. He married, raised a family and farmed in the Omata district and served on Taranaki's provincial council and then Ōakura Roads Board among other positions. Mace died at Ōakura on 7 August 1927, aged 90, and was lauded in a glowing obituary, which noted he was "a brave and gallant officer and gentleman."

== Legacy ==
More recently, Mace's contribution was cast in a different context in Puke Ariki’s ‘Taranaki War 1860–2010 – Our Legacy Our Challenge – Te Ahi Ka Roa, Te Ahi Katoro’. A panel in the 2010 exhibition observed that ‘by admiring and glorifying his actions, settlers and their descendants could celebrate their victories over Māori, and see them as right and good’.
