= New Zealand Cross (1869) =

Military decoration introduced in 1869

Original New Zealand Cross

The New Zealand Cross was introduced in 1869 during the New Zealand Wars in New Zealand. The wars were fought between natives of New Zealand, the Māori, and forces raised by European settlers known as Pākehā assisted by British troops.

Many acts of bravery, gallantry and devotion to duty were recorded among the local militia, armed constabulary and volunteers, but there was one militia Victoria Cross awarded to Charles Heaphy in 1867 for action in 1864.

On 10 March 1869, without checking the facts and under the mistaken impression colonial troops were not eligible for the Victoria Cross unless under command of British troops, the Governor of New Zealand, Sir George Bowen, instituted the New Zealand Cross as the highest New Zealand award.

He was widely criticised in England, and accused of usurping the prerogative of Queen Victoria, but she eventually ratified his action.

Only 23 New Zealand Crosses were awarded with first six published in the New Zealand Gazette in 1869. There was one award gazetted in 1870 and the remaining 16 awards gazetted between 1875 and 1910, from six to 44 years after the actions commended.

It has the form of a silver cross pattée. The obverse contains the words 'NEW ZEALAND' in the centre, gilded in gold, which are encircled by a laurel wreath. Each limb of the cross has a six-point star, in gold. The cross is surmounted by a gold Imperial State Crown. The reverse of the medal has two concentric circles with the name of the recipient engraved between the circles, and the date of the action engraved within the inner circle. A crimson ribbon passes through a silver suspender clasp with small gold laurel leaves. For the first 20 medals cast in 1871, the reverse of the suspender clasp contains the cartouche of the goldsmith Messrs Phillips Brothers and Son of Cockspur Street, London; which was omitted from a further five medals cast in 1886.

== Recipients ==
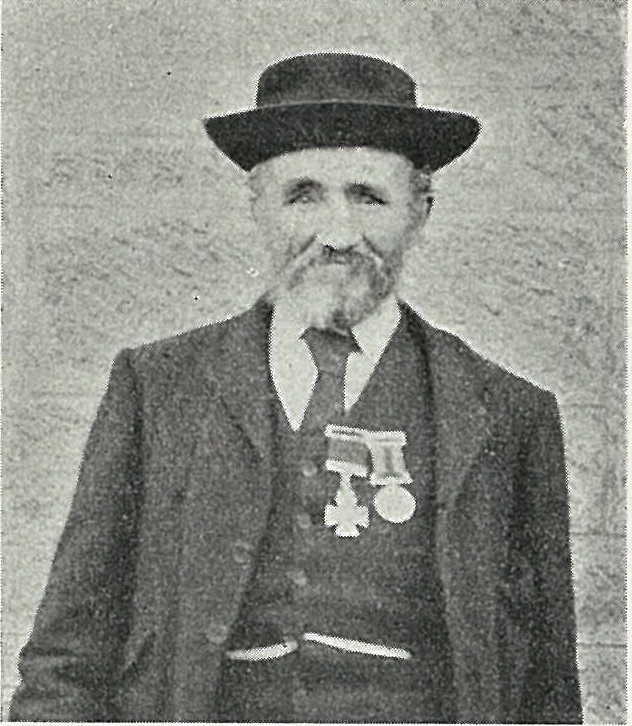
Sergeant Solomon Black

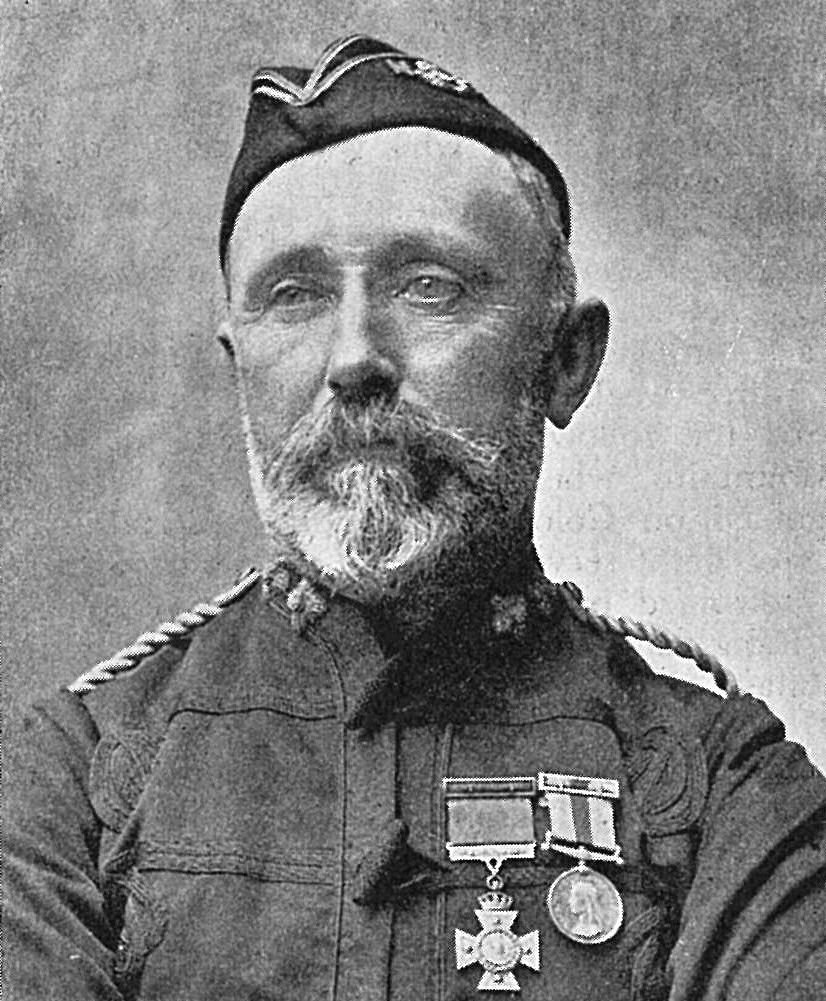
Captain George Preece

Recipients of the original New Zealand Cross were:

- Private Thomas Adamson, Corps of Guides, Ahikereru, 1869.
- Constable Henare Kepa Te Ahururu, 1st Division, Armed Constabulary, Moturoa, 1868.
- Sergeant Samuel Austin, Wanganui Contingent, Putahi Pa and Keteonetea, 1866.
- Constable Solomon Black, 1st Division, Armed Constabulary, Ngatapa, 1869.
- Constable Benjamin Biddle, 1st Division, Armed Constabulary, Ngatapa, 1869.
- Sergeant Arthur Wakefield Carkeek, Armed Constabulary, Ohinemutu, 1870.
- Dr Isaac Earl Featherston, Native Contingent, Otapawa Pa, 1866.
- Sergeant George (Rowley) Hill, 1st Division, Armed Constabulary, Hiruharama Pa, Mohaka, 1869.
- Trooper William Lingard, Kai Iwi Cavalry Volunteers, Tauranga-ika, 1868, originally from Ruan, County Clare.
- Captain Frank Mace, Taranaki Militia, Kaitikara River, 1863.
- Captain Gilbert Mair, NZ Militia, Rotoma, 1870.
- Sergeant Christopher Louis Maling, Corps of Guides, Tauranga-ika, 1868.
- Lieutenant-Colonel Thomas McDonnell, NZ Militia, Paparatu, 1863 and Putahi Pa, 1866.
- Ensign Henry William Northcroft, Patea Rangers, Pungarehu and Tirotiro Moana, 1866.
- Sub-inspector George Augustus Preece, Armed Constabulary, Ngatapa, 1869.
- Major Kepa Te Rangihiwinui, NZ Militia (Native Contingent), Moturoa, 1868, and Otauto 1869.
- Inspector John Mackintosh Roberts, Armed Constabulary, Moturoa, 1868.
- Trooper Antonio Rodrigues de Sardinha, Taranaki Mounted Volunteers, Poutoko 1863 and Kaitake, 1864.
- Sergeant Richard Shepherd, Armed Constabulary, Otauto, 1869.
- Cornet Angus Smith, Bay of Plenty Cavalry Volunteers, Opepe, 1869.
- Major Ropata Wahawaha, Native Contingent, Ngatapa, 1869.
- Assistant-Surgeon Samuel Walker, Armed Constabulary, Otauto, 1869.
- Cornet Harry Charles William Wrigg, Bay of Plenty Cavalry Volunteers, Opotiki, 1867.

One member of the New Zealand colonial forces, Major Charles Heaphy was awarded the VC for his actions in 1864, when he was commanding British troops. See List of New Zealand Victoria Cross recipients and New Zealand Land Wars Victoria Cross recipients.

== 1999 Medal ==
In 1999, the New Zealand Cross was re-instituted. The Royal Warrant of 20 September 1999 created four awards for bravery and four for gallantry.

The new New Zealand Cross for Bravery is similar to the 1869 medal with some amendments. The Crown is now the current St Edward's Crown instead of the Victorian Imperial State Crown, and New Zealand fern fronds replace laurel leaves. The ribbon is bright blue, a colour traditionally associated with bravery awards.

There is also a new Victoria Cross for New Zealand for Gallantry, which has the same crimson ribbon and is made to the same design and of the same gunmetal as the British VC.

== See also ==
- New Zealand campaign medals
- New Zealand gallantry awards
- New Zealand bravery awards
