= Te Keepa Te Rangihiwinui =

Māori military commander

Te Keepa Te Rangihiwinui NZC
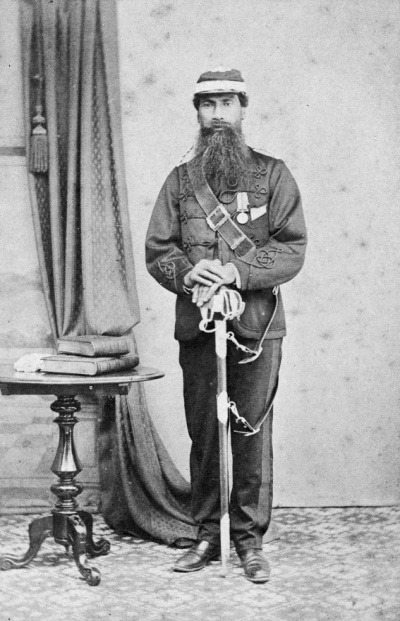
- Born: near Opiki, New Zealand
- Died: 15 April 1898; Putiki, New Zealand
- Burial place: Putiki Urupa
- Military career
- Allegiance: British Empire
- Service years: 1864–1872
- Rank: Major
- Nickname: Major Kemp
- Units: Whanganui Native Contingent
- Conflicts: New Zealand War: Second Taranaki War; East Cape War; Tītokowaru's War; Te Kooti's War
- Awards: New Zealand War Medal

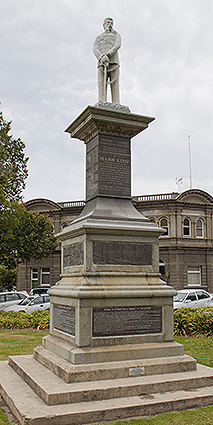
The Kemp Monument at Whanganui's Moutoa Gardens erected by the people of New Zealand to honour the "high-born Maori chief, brave soldier and staunch ally of the New Zealand Government"

Te Keepa Te Rangihiwinui NZC (died 15 April 1898) was a Māori military commander and noted ally of the government forces during the New Zealand Wars. First known as Te Rangihiwinui, he was later known as Te Keepa, Meiha Keepa, Major Keepa or Major Kemp.

== Early life ==
Te Rangihiwinui's father was Mahuera Paki Tanguru-o-te-rangi, a leader of the Muaūpoko iwi (tribe). His mother was Rere-ō-maki, sister of Te Anaua, a leader of Ngāti Ruaka, a subtribe of Te Āti Haunui-a-Pāpārangi. Te Rangihiwinui was probably born in the early 1820s near Opiki in the Horowhenua. His early years were spent under the threat of tribal warfare resulting from the invasion of their tribal land by the Ngāti Toa, led by Te Rauparaha, and the allied Ngāti Raukawa and Te Āti Awa. Keepa's father was an early supporter of New Zealand Company settlement established at Whanganui and served as a constable in the Armed Police Force.

In 1848, Te Keepa was a constable in the Armed Police Force, and was likely serving at Waikane under the command of Major but a few years later was based at Whanganui. Along with other constables, he carried mail between Wellington and the Taranaki region, work that was in addition to their policing role.

== Second Taranaki War ==
In 1864, the Māori tribes on the Upper Whanganui River converted to the Pai Mārire religion and threatened to invade Whanganui town. Te Keepa led the tribes of the lower river to defend the town. The result was the Battle of Moutoa Island and a substantial defeat for the Pai Mārire force on 14 May 1864.

This was the start of six years of warfare for Te Keepa, always fighting on the side of the Pākehā government, usually working closely with Captain Thomas McDonnell. In February 1865, Te Keepa and his force of Whanganui Māori warriors took part in the attack on Ohoutahi Pa, a major Pai Mārire stronghold. Following the murder of the missionary Volkner, they were shipped to the other side of the country, to Ōpōtiki. However they soon returned to Taranaki and were involved in the capture of Wereroa Pa and then the relief of Pipiriki.

Te Keepa gradually built up a personal contingent of between one and two hundred warriors, men who were paid by the government but whose loyalty was to him and his mana as a fighting chieftain. In 1868, he and his men were involved with the insurgency of Titokowaru. Te Keepa commanded the rearguard during the retreat from Te Ngutu o Te Manu after the government forces had been defeated and again in similar circumstances after the Battle of Moturoa. Te Keepa commanded the force pursuing Tītokowaru after he abandoned his pa at Tauranga Ika. It was the first time that British soldiers, officers and men, had served under a Māori commander. By this time Te Keepa had been promoted to the rank of major.

== Pursuit of Te Kooti ==
As soon as Titokowaru ceased to be a threat, Te Keepa and his men were transported to the East Coast to join in the pursuit of Te Kooti. Such was his reputation that the Battle of Te Pōrere near Tongariro was delayed until Te Keepa and his men arrived; they were marching up the Whanganui River in the face of snowstorms and volcanic eruptions.

The final pursuit of Te Kooti through the Ureweras was largely handed over to Te Keepa and another Māori war leader, Ropata Wahawaha. He and his men returned to Whanganui in 1871. Over the following years he was honoured with the Queen's Sword of Honour in 1870, the New Zealand Cross in 1874 and the New Zealand War Medal in 1876.

== Later life ==
In 1871 Te Keepa was appointed as a land purchase officer in Whanganui. He saw this as an opportunity to correct some of the wrongs done to his people during his childhood, a chance to regain some of the land they had lost to the Ngati Raukawa by conquest. This almost brought the tribes to war, Te Keepa threatened to call upon his personal following of warriors if the government did not back up his decisions. There were some violent clashes before the issue went in his favour.

The same year he contested the Western Maori electorate in the 1871 election, the second time that elections in Māori electorates were held. Of three candidates, he came second, with Wiremu Parata winning the election and the incumbent, Mete Kīngi Paetahi, coming last. He was one of three candidates in the Western Maori electorate in the 1876 election, when he came second. He was beaten by Hoani Nahe and was ahead of the incumbent, Wiremu Parata.

In 1880, Te Keepa set up a Māori trust to protect Māori land from European buyers. A large area of inland Wanganui was declared off limits to all Europeans. This provoked the government, but Te Keepa's large personal following of warriors meant they were very cautious in dealing with him. In addition, he had the support of some members of the government, including the Native Minister, John Ballance. He unsuccessfully contested the Western Maori electorate in the 1884 election. Of eight candidates, he came second with 20.1% of the vote.

Land dealings in his later years added stresses and caused debts. He sought to unify the Maori tribes in the Te Kotahitanga (unity of purpose) movement, and force government adherence to the principles of the Treaty of Waitangi. In a speech he made in March 1889 at Ōrākei he urged the government to work with Te Kotahitanga but this was rejected. Te Keepa Te Rangihiwinui died at Putiki, near Whanganui, on 15 April 1898.

In 1912, a statue of Te Keepa was erected in Moutoa Gardens in Whanganui. Funded by Te Keepa's sister and the government, it is known as the Kemp Monument. The statue, made in marble by the Frank Harris Granite Co. in Auckland and mounted on a base of Aberdeen granite, was argued by Te Keepa's sister to not be a good likeness of her brother and was in the following years the subject of litigation over non-payment for its construction. The monument is identified by Heritage New Zealand as a Historic Place Category 1 with the list number 165.
