= New Zealand War Medal =

Campaign medal awarded to troops in the New Zealand Wars

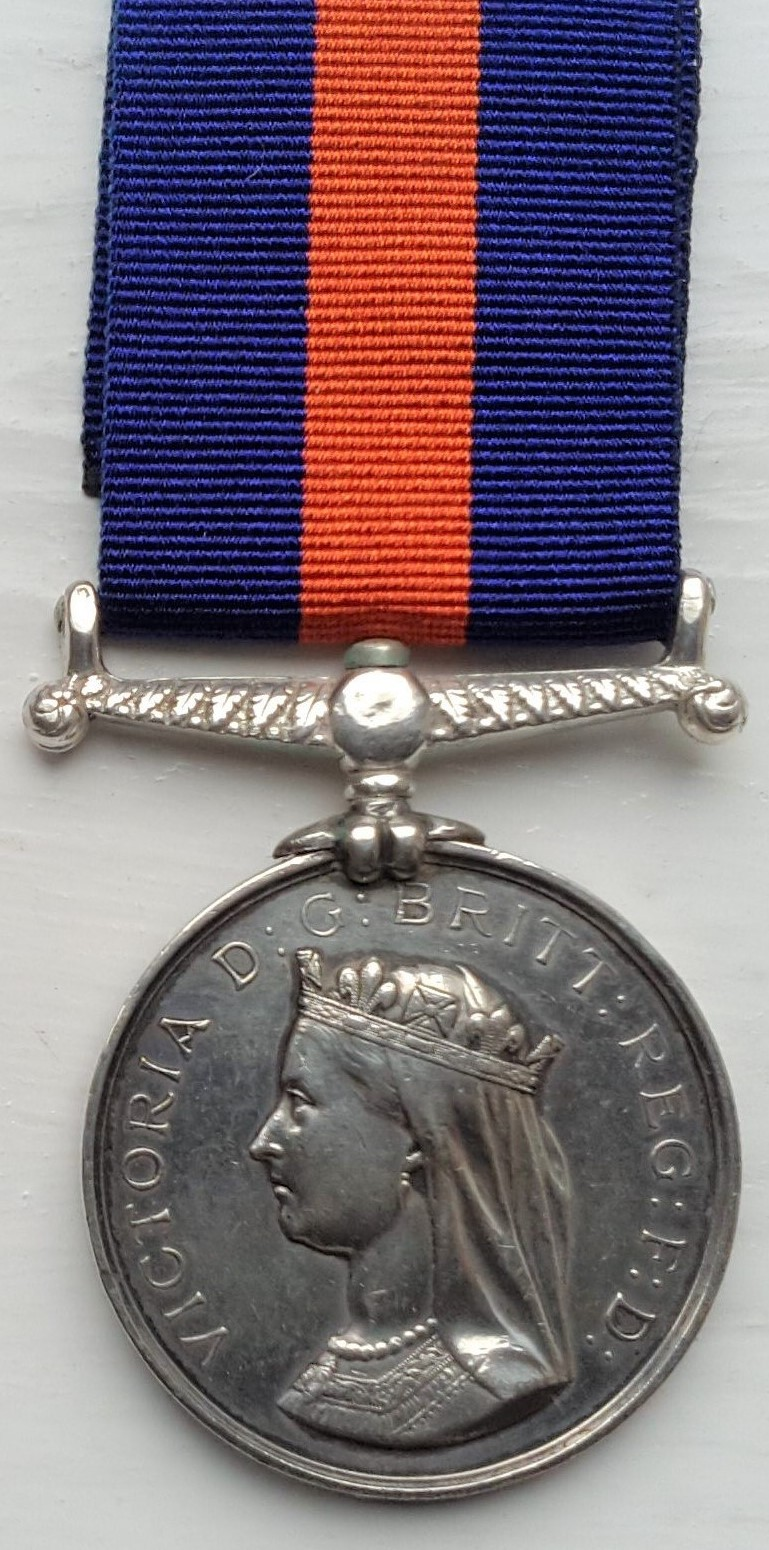
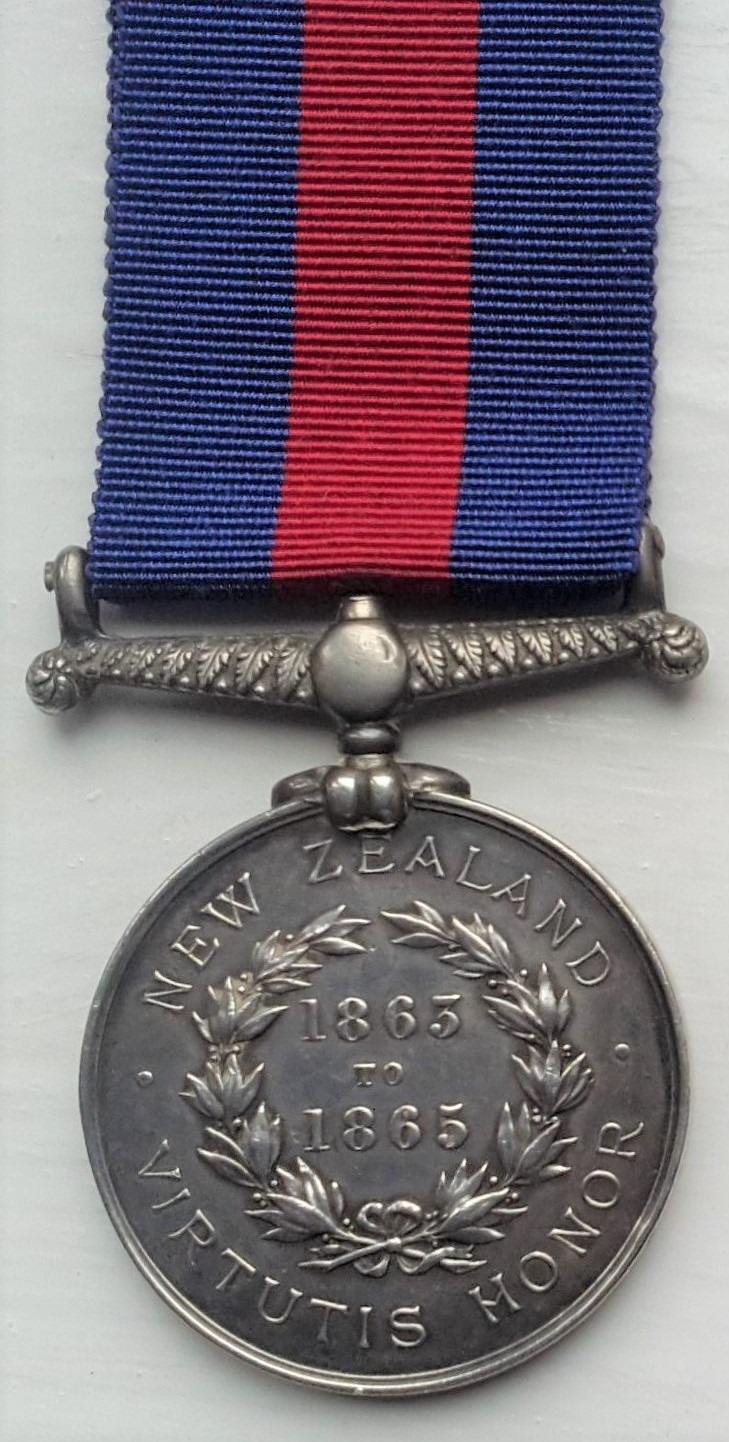
- Obverse and reverse of the medal
- Type: Campaign medal
- Awarded for: Campaign service
- Description: Silver disk, 36 mm in diameter
- Presented by: United Kingdom of Great Britain and Ireland
- Eligibility: British and Colonial forces
- Campaigns: New Zealand Wars (1845–47, 1860–66)
- Established: 1869

Highlights
- Total recipients: 4,400
- Ribbon bar
- Related: New Zealand Cross for bravery

The New Zealand War Medal was a campaign medal authorised in 1869 to be awarded to Imperial and Colonial troops involved in the New Zealand Wars of 1845–47 and 1860–66. The New Zealand Wars were previously known as the Māori Wars, Anglo-Māori Wars or Land Wars.

Imperial forces included British Army, Royal Navy and Royal Marines. The Colonial militia were recruited both locally and in Australia, and included mobile forces like Von Tempsky's Forest Rangers and the Arawa Flying Column from a Māori tribe for the guerrilla war in the New Zealand bush.

For Imperial forces, it was awarded to those "who actually served in the field against the enemy in New Zealand".

The medal was granted to Colonial Forces and Friendly natives who had "been actually under fire, or otherwise conspicuous for distinguished service in the field," and also to nearest relatives of anyone killed in action or who had died of his wounds. Claims from Colonial forces were closed in 1900 but reopened in 1910 and 1913 in association with land claims for service in the war. Claims were finally closed for Europeans in 1915 and Māori in 1916.

== Description ==
The medal is silver, circular, 36 millimetres (1.4 in) in diameter and with a straight bar suspender ornamented with New Zealand fern fronds. The medal was designed by the brothers A. B. and J. S. Wyon.

The obverse shows an effigy of Queen Victoria, facing left and wearing a diadem and veil, with the legend: VICTORIA D: G: BRITT : REG : F : D : The bust is similar to, but larger than, that on the Abyssinian Medal issued in the same year.

The reverse has a laurel wreath containing the year or years between which the recipient served, with the words NEW ZEALAND above and VIRTUTIS HONOR (Honour of valour) below. The year(s) of service, within the period 1845 to 1866, were shown over three lines, for example: 1863 / to / 1865. Uniquely for a British campaign medal, the years are die struck in the centre. The longest period shown on an awarded medal was "1846 to 1865", of which only one was bestowed, while unawarded specimens are known bearing the dates "1846 to 1866". Those medals claimed after the recipient's discharge were issued undated, these including most Colonial militia and some Imperial forces.

The rim of the medal was impressed with the recipient's number, name, regiment and – for those above private – their rank. Some medals with an undated reverse also have the relevant years of service engraved on the rim.

The ribbon, 1.25 inches (32 mm) wide, is of blue with a 10 mm red centre stripe.

No clasps (bars) were issued.

== Number issued ==
The number struck was 1,957 (Imperial government) and 2,500 (Colonial government), total 4,457, of which about 4,400 were issued. It was only awarded to surviving veterans.

The New Zealand Ministry of Defence retained a few unclaimed medals, some of which they sold in the 1960s marked "specimen" and with the name of the recipient obliterated.

== See also ==
Dennerly, Peter Y. (May 1986). "The New Zealand War Medal: Awards to Colonial Units". The Volunteers: The Journal of the New Zealand Military Historical Society. 12 (4). New Zealand Military Historical Society.
