= George Stoddart Whitmore =

British Army general (1829-1903)

Sir George Stoddart Whitmore
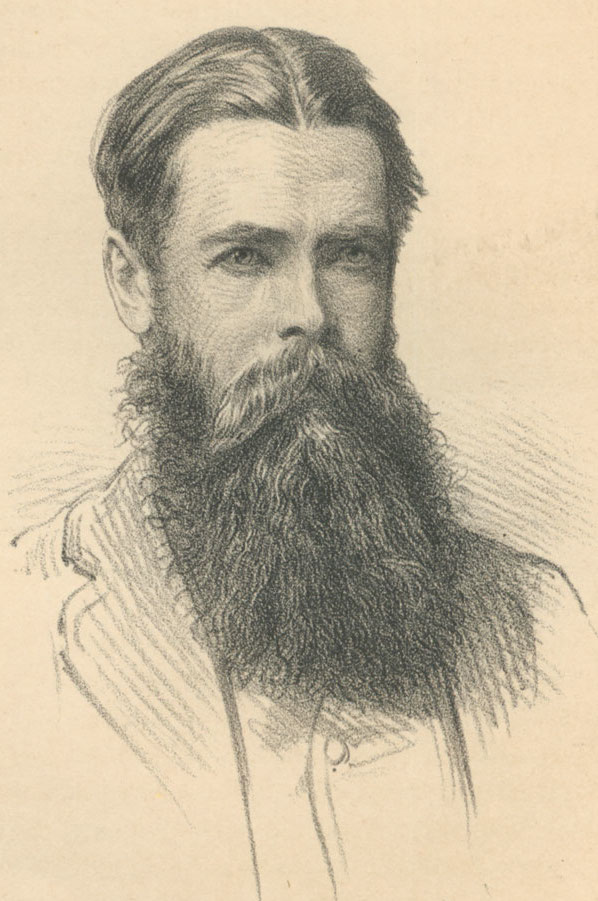
- George Whitmore
- Born: 30 May 1829; Malta
- Died: 16 March 1903 (aged 73); Napier, New Zealand
- Relatives: Esther James (great-granddaughter); George Whitmore (grandfather); Montagu Stopford (uncle)
- Military career
- Allegiance: United Kingdom
- Branch: British Army
- Service years: 1847–1862
- Rank: major general
- Units: Cape Mounted Riflemen; 62nd (Wiltshire) Regiment of Foot
- Conflicts: Xhosa Wars; Crimean War * Siege of Sevastopol; New Zealand Wars
- Other work: politician

Sir George Stoddart Whitmore KCMG (30 May 1829 – 16 March 1903) was a New Zealand soldier, military leader, runholder and politician.

== Early life ==
Whitmore was born on 30 May 1829 to a lieutenant in the British Army, stationed in Malta with the Royal Engineers, and his wife. His maternal grandfather was Sir John Stoddart, the Chief Justice of Malta while his paternal grandfather was General Sir George Whitmore. He also had several uncles serving in the British Army. He was educated at Edinburgh Academy and then went on to the Staff College.

== Military career ==
Whitmore entered the British Army in 1847 as an ensign in the Cape Mounted Rifles, a unit serving in South Africa. He fought in the Xhosa Wars the same year and then the Boer insurrection of 1848. He was promoted to lieutenant in May 1850, and was involved in a further conflict with the Xhosa from 1851 to 1853. For a time he was commander of the escort for the Governor of Cape Colony, Sir Harry Smith. He was present at the Battle of Berea, serving as Sir George Cathcart's brigade major. His service in South Africa ended in 1854 and he returned to England. He was accompanied by his wife, Eliza McGlocking, who he had met in 1851. The couple went on to have three children.

Promoted to captain in July 1854, Whitmore was posted to the 62nd Regiment of Foot. He went with the regiment to the Crimea where it was serving in the Crimean War. It fought in the Siege of Sevastopol, during which half the officers in his regiment were killed. He later commanded a unit of cavalry, made up of Turkish volunteers. He then performed logistical operations in Austria–Hungary, Romania, and Russia. Well regarded for his service in the war, he was rewarded with the fourth class of Order of the Medjidie, a Turkish decoration.

In 1858, Whitmore attended Staff College but withdrew from his studies on account of health issues. He was later sent to Canada for a time to serve as aide-de-camp to the General Officer Commanding, Canada, Major-General William Eyre. He was able to resume his studies in 1860 and graduated from Staff College with top marks.

In 1861 Whitmore was dispatched to New Zealand as military secretary to Lieutenant-General Duncan Cameron, the newly appointed commander of British forces in that country. At the time, the British forces were engaged in hostilities with Maori in the Taranaki region. However, when Whitmore and Cameron arrived in New Zealand in March 1861, the conflict had ceased. After 12 months, and frustrated with the lack of opportunities to demonstrate their military abilities, both men tendered their resignation from the British Army; while Cameron's was declined, Whitmore's was accepted.

== New Zealand ==
On becoming a civilian, Whitmore settled in the Hawke's Bay Region, where he had purchased a farm late the previous year in partnership with another officer of Cameron's staff. Taking over the running of the property from the manager, he set about improving it, using the proceeds from the sale of his commission. Over time, he gradually increased the size of his farm, on which he ran sheep and cattle, through leases on neighbouring land, gradually accumulated a holding of 110,000 acres by 1872. For two and a half years from March 1863, he was the civil commissioner for Ahuriri and he also turned his hand to politics and became a member of the New Zealand Legislative Council on 31 August 1863. Locally he gained a reputation for gaining personal benefits from his official positions and he often fell out with his business and political colleagues.

When the Invasion of the Waikato commenced in July 1863, Whitmore volunteered for Cameron's staff. He was present at the battles of Katikara and Orakau but played no active role in the war. He was also commander of the Hawke's Bay Colonial Defence Force. He left the country for a time in 1865 to visit England. While in London, he married Isabella Smith. His first wife had died a few years previously. There were no children from his second marriage.

=== Tītokowaru's War ===
In 1866, he successfully led two hundred militia and volunteers at Omaranui, surrounded the gathering Hau Haus, who threatened destruction to the settlement of Napier, and cut off or captured them almost to a man. In 1868 he conducted a campaign against the celebrated Te Kooti, who had just escaped from the Chatham Islands, and drove him and his followers into hiding. A month later he was placed in command of the West Coast force, which had met with some reverses, and had to be recruited and reorganised. For some considerable time Te Kooti kept the country in a state of alarm. His successes brought many wild spirits to his standard, and he placed his fortress at Ngatapa, a wooded mountain whose summit is about two thousand five hundred feet above the level of the sea. It was said to be the strongest fortified post in the North Island. The massacre at Poverty Bay compelled the Government to send Colonel Whitmore to reduce this stronghold. He mounted the Siege of Ngatapa and after six days, the place was taken on 5 January 1869, and the enemy escaped with very severe loss. Returning to the West Coast, he led the colonial troops successfully from Kai Iwi to the Waitara, recovering all the country that had been abandoned and defeating Titokowaru's band in several engagements. Having completely pacified the West Coast, he was sent to put down the insurrection in the Urewera mountains, where Te Kooti had once more raised a body of followers.

This duty had been scarcely accomplished when a change in the Ministry occurred. Mr. Fox defeated Mr. Stafford, and at once removed Colonel Whitmore from the command of the troops in the field, just at the moment when complete success appeared close at hand. Te Kooti, being unpursued, was able to recover from the effects of defeat; and it was consequently eighteen months afterwards before he was again reduced to the same straits. In October 1877, Colonel Whitmore joined Sir George Grey's Ministry as Colonial Secretary, retiring in October 1879, with the rest of his colleagues. In 1870 he was appointed C.M.G., and in the 1882 Birthday Honours K.C.M.G.

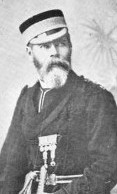
Whitmore in his later years

As a member of the Legislative Council, he was a member of the short-lived Stout-Vogel Cabinet in August 1884, as a Minister without portfolio. The same combination coming back to power in September of the same year, he was appointed commandant of the colonial forces and commissioner of the armed constabulary, with the rank of major-general, conferred for the first time in New Zealand on an officer of the colonial forces.

== Later life ==
After his resignation, Whitmore returned to his farm and resumed actively managing his estate. He also turned his hand to writing, authoring an account of his experience of the fighting with the Maori. This was published in 1902 as The Last Maori War in New Zealand Under the Self Reliant Policy. On 16 March 1903 Whitmore died in Napier. He had spent the previous few years in poor health after suffering a stroke. He was buried in Napier Cemetery.

== Notes ==
Police appointments
| New title | Commissioner of Police of New Zealand; 1886 | Succeeded by Walter Edward Gudgeon |
