= Thomas McDonnell =

Thomas McDonnell NZC
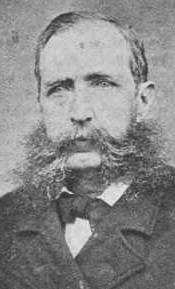
- Nickname: Fighting Mac
- Born: 1831–1833
- Died: 8 November 1899 (aged 67) Whanganui, New Zealand
- Buried: Heads Road Cemetery, Whanganui
- Allegiance: British Empire
- Rank: Colonel
- Conflicts: New Zealand Wars: Invasion of the Waikato; East Cape War; Second Taranaki War; Tītokowaru's War; Te Kooti's War

Thomas McDonnell NZC (c. 1832 – 8 November 1899) was a 19th-century New Zealand public servant, military leader and writer.

== Biography ==
=== Childhood and early life ===
McDonnell was born to Thomas McDonnell Sr., an early British merchant and speculator who served a brief term as Additional British Resident, and his wife Anna McDonnell (née Patterson). He was born between 1831 and 1833 and raised first in Sydney, then Horeke, Northland. There he learned to speak Māori and how to use the traditional taiaha weapon. He tried his luck on the Victorian goldfields from 1853 to 1855, then returned to New Zealand where he obtained a post in the Native Land Purchase Department under Alfred Domett in Auckland. After being paid eight months late, McDonnell resigned from that job and went sheepfarming in the Hawkes Bay with his brother William, only to be defrauded by a third party. He returned to Auckland in 1862 and was appointed interpreter to the resident magistrate at Thames, panning for gold on the side.

=== New Zealand Wars ===
Through Alfred Domett, McDonnell obtained a commission in the Colonial Defence Force as a sub-inspector in 1863. During this time McDonnell served in the Invasion of the Waikato, seeing action at the battles of Rangiaowhia and Hairini. He was promoted to captain in 1864.

==== Tītokowaru's War ====
Following the end of the conflict in the Waikato, McDonnell took command of the colonial forces at Patea in 1866. McDonnell led a short and ruthless campaign against a number of Taranaki Māori villages, torching and destroying as he and his men went.

=== Retirement from military ===
On 9 April 1870, McDonnell married Henrietta Elise Lomax, in Wellington. Together they had four children. He acquired £690 in government grants and £1,400 worth of freehold property at Wanganui, and set up as a Native Land Court interpreter and land agent at Wanganui in 1884. At the 1884 general election McDonnell stood as a candidate in the Waitotara electorate in opposition to John Bryce. He was beaten by Bryce by the margin of 156 votes.

He received the New Zealand Cross on 31 March 1886, and published fragmented memoirs, as well as a fanciful Māori history of the wars.

=== Death ===
McDonnell died on 8 November 1899.
