= Kūpapa =

Māori who fought on the British side in the New Zealand Wars

Kūpapa were Māori who fought on the British side in the New Zealand Wars of the 19th century.

The motives of the kūpapa varied greatly, as did their degree of commitment to the British cause. Historian James Belich identified three categories of groups within their ranks.

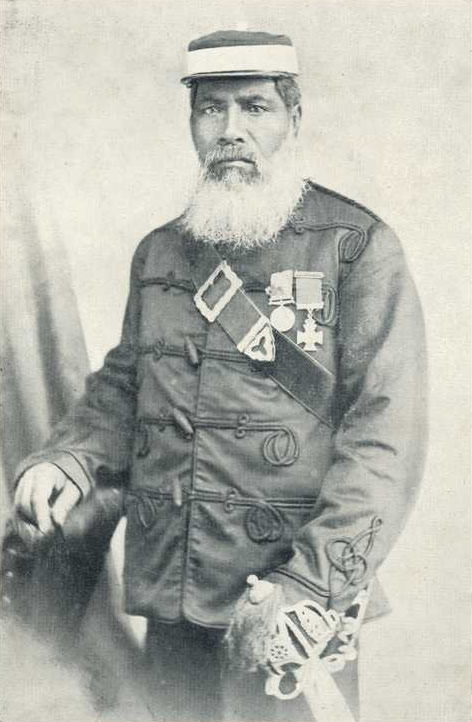
Ngāti Porou chief and kūpapa leader Major Ropata Wahawaha.

At one end of the scale were kūpapa groups who had whole-hearted support for the British. These included the largest tribe in New Zealand Ngāpuhi, (estimated by demographer Ian Pool to have 40% of all Māori people in 1840) who held a meeting under their chief Tāmati Wāka Nene, in the Hokianga in 1863 to back the government in the war against the Waikato "rebels". Waka Nene, who was a close supporter of governor Grey, offered the services of Ngāpuhi warriors, which Grey declined. It also included the bulk of the Arawa, from Rotorua and Bay of Plenty, who had become estranged from their Māori neighbours and sought an alliance with the government to survive in isolation. Others who were deeply committed were bands of warriors affiliated with chiefs such as Ropata Wahawaha of Ngāti Porou and Te Keepa Te Rangihiwinui of Wanganui whose power in the tribe had grown because of their kūpapa activities.

A second category included groups who supported the British cause for a limited reason of their own—either to protect their economic activities with British settlers or to gain an advantage over local rivals. Belich suggests kūpapa involvement in the Battle of Moutoa on May 14, 1864, thwarting a Pai Mārire raid on Whanganui, was motivated by their desire to protect their valuable commercial dealings at the settlement.

A third category of kūpapa gave superficial support to the British, accompanying colonial expeditions but declining to do much fighting. Some in this category joined simply for the pay—Wanganui warriors who joined the British to battle Tītokowaru during hostilities in 1868-9 received four shillings a day.

Belich claims the British rarely recognised the differing levels of commitment and frequently accused kūpapa of treachery, cowardice, lethargy and incompetence. But he says the kūpapa were often good soldiers, particularly when given government support that allowed them to muster large forces and maintain them longer than their Māori foe. He concluded: "Despite their qualified commitment, kūpapa were vital to the colonists after the withdrawal of Imperial troops. Without them, the colonial operations of 1864-8 would have been far less successful, and the wars against Tītokowaru and Te Kooti might have been lost."

Historian Michael King said kūpapa Māori mostly prospered in the wake of the land wars. He said their lands and resources were intact, they received favourable government attention, including ceremonial swords and monuments for their dead, and were also consulted on some matters of public policy.

The exact numbers are unclear, but approximately 560 British and colonial troops, 250 kūpapa, and 2,000 Māori who fought against the Crown may have died in the wars. Initially, around 1 million hectares of land was confiscated from iwi that were against the Crown, although some of this land was eventually returned.

== Position of Māori in the British army ==
During the initial Taranaki skirmishes, British regulars were outnumbered and aided by Māori auxiliaries. However, Lieutenant-Colonel J. E. Alexander of the 2/14th Regiment questioned the effectiveness of these Māori allies but later noted: "It is true that they were very useful in detecting ambuscades in procuring and cutting firewood, building wharres [sic] [huts] etc.; and in this way their presence to the force may be useful but the fighting should be perhaps confined to the white soldiers alone." Regardless Lieutenant-Colonel’s observation kūpapa were frequently used in combats and they also were notably rapid at adaptation process including dress and customs, moreover, they turned out to be outstanding in tactics and the British had significantly benefited from it not just once.

The kūpapa chiefs frequently discussed organizational matters with their British employers. For instance, when Colonel J. Whitmore included Arawa chiefs in the later stages of the war, they were insisting on payment of four shillings per day for their warriors, the same rate as colonial militia in active service. Additionally, they demanded three officers for every 100 men and minimal deductions from pay for rations. At the same time, they required a blue shirt for each enlisted warrior. Imperial commanders found the independence of these officer-chiefs from time to time frustrating. Major-General Trevor Chute, known as ‘The Kerry Bull’ by his soldiers, even threatened them with execution during the final Taranaki campaigns, although he never carried out the threat because he needed their support. Kūpapa warriors were increasingly effective and for that reason they were allowed to discipline and train their own men. They were accomplished sharpshooters attacking from the cover of trees and frequently sneaking into enemy territory disguised as reinforcements. Despite wearing imperial uniforms and wielding swords, the chiefs of the auxiliaries were Māori warriors who followed the Māori code of warfare, including the concept of utu, or seeking revenge through murdering.

== Etymology ==
The meaning of the term in Te Reo Māori is interpreted as “cringing dog crawling along the ground”, however, the kūpapa themselves were in favor of more respectable references like ‘native auxiliaries’, ‘loyalists’, ‘members of the allied tribes’ and were also called Queenites, from Queen Victoria, and the friendly natives.

The word kūpapa has originally been used as verb, noun and modifier (lexical cognates). If used as a verb, it means ‘to lie flat, stoop, go stealthily’, ‘to remain quiet’, or ‘to be neutral in a quarrel, collaborate, collude’. When it takes a role of a modifier, it conveys the meaning of ‘being at a low level, near the ground, or above the surface’. The idea hidden behind this word and its usage is clear, and it gave rise to a noun kūpapa which meant ‘a collaborator, ally’ and referred to Māori who sided with Pākehā opposition or the Government. The primal and historical meaning has undergone temporal changes and was adjusted to modern realities. It has become more derogatory and closer in meaning to terms such as ‘turncoat’, ‘traitor’, ‘quisling’, and ‘Uncle Tom’.

The term has also had an occasional modern usage in a derogatory sense to describe a Māori who is seen as being on the Pākehā or government side and acting against the interests of Māori in conflicts with government authorities.

According to R. I. M. Burnett, the translated name appeared to have had various meanings and shades of meanings before being adopted by the camp followers of the Native Contingent. For example in January 1862, J. Armitage associated ‘kupapa’ with ‘neutral’ when reporting the Ngatitahinga tribal council. Two years later the Rev. L. Williams confirmed that the Turanga Maoris “always call themselves ‘Kupapa’, as being partisans of neither side”.

In 1844 the term was defined by William Williams as a verb, 'stoop', and subsequent usages in print refer to stealthy movement. Kūpapa meaning 'neutrality' began to be used in late 1861, and only came to mean Māori supporters of the government around 1868.

However, “The New Zealand Herald”, on 17 June 1864 stated that Kūpapa was the “Kingite cognomen for Queen natives”. The Rev. B. Y. Ashwell appeared to embrace both meanings. In June 1865, he used the phrase “one of the (Kupapa) friendly natives”, and, five months later, reported seeing “a good many of the hostile natives who are living with the Kupapas or neutral party” at Tamahere.

== Senior chiefs ==
During the war, senior chiefs gained remarkable reputations as talented tacticians and leaders but at the same time they were occasionally rivals. Major Kemp (Te Rangihiwinui, Taitoko, Te Keepa), a chief from the same region, had been the primary rival of Major Mete Kingi Paeteahi. Initially, as Paeteahi showed just some sympathy towards H. M. Army, Kemp organised a contingent of his own and received a captain's commission, which encouraged Paeteahi to finally and fully support the British and provide his own contingent. Kemp's bravery and skills in bush-fighting impressed the British, earning him a sword of honour, and his supporters gave him the title 'General'.

Mete Kingi himself was one of the most renowned Kūpapas and quite possibly the first to receive a daily wage for his services, later provided a slightly altered interpretation of the term kūpapa. While speaking before the House of Representatives in June 1869 regarding the retreat from Waihi to Wanganui the preceding year and citing advice from Colonel T. Haultain to align with the pakeha and adopt their methods, he said, "I explained to him that it was customary for Māoris to employ strategy. Consequently, I persuaded the group at Wanganui to venture into the woods. Upon their return, the War Minister proposed that if the Maoris were organized as troopers, they could commence action. However, the Māoris objected to fighting as troopers; they preferred fighting as Kūpapas".

Another notable officer-chief, Major Ropata Wahawaha from the East Coast of New Zealand's North Island, also seized the chance to engage in warfare against his tribe's longstanding adversaries, who aligned with the Māori king. Ropata's bravery and self-promotion, forged by tales of his courage and innovative strategies, earned him a longstanding fame and adoration. Stories tell about his extraordinary courage, his preference for using only a walking stick as a weapon, his mastery in unarmed combat against rebels, and his fearless leadership from perilous positions, often ignoring his own safety.
