= Ringatū =

Māori Christian denomination

The Ringatū church is a Māori church in New Zealand, founded in 1868 by Te Kooti Arikirangi te Turuki, commonly called Te Kooti. The symbol for the movement is an upraised hand, or ringa ("hand") tū ("raised") in Māori.

== Origins ==
Te Kooti was a wild young man, and in his childhood his father had tried to bury him alive. In 1852, Te Kooti, with others, formed a lawless group who travelled through the East Coast area while stealing from both Māori and Pākehā alike. He became very unpopular with his hapū, who armed themselves to force him out of the area.

Te Kooti became a successful trader on a ship plying from Gisborne to Auckland.

When many of his hapū became Pai Mārire ("Hauhau") supporters, Te Kooti initially joined the government forces but is alleged to have taken gunpowder and given it to his brother, who was a member of the Hauhau faith. Martial law had been declared in the area which gave the government forces sweeping powers. Te Kooti was arrested along with many others and was detained in the Chatham Islands in relation to the East Coast disturbances of the 1860s.

=== Prison ===
During his captivity, Te Kooti studied the Bible intensely and conducted religious services based particularly on the Old Testament but incorporating traditional Māori beliefs and mythology. After the departure of the traditional chiefs, Te Kooti was able to assume a leadership position. He specialised in dramatic symbolic displays involving tricks he had learnt from sailors using phosphorus from match heads to make his fingers appear on fire.

In Māori tradition lizards are considered very tapu and Te Kooti would take on the persona of a lizard, stiffening his body, arching his back and spreading his fingers. Part of his religious performance was speaking in tongues.

His religious lore was oral and involved riddles and challenges. The most well-known challenge was to eat a large white stone. A supporter solved the riddle by powdering the stone which all the supporters ate. Te Kooti developed the myth that white quartz stones were diamonds and symbolically the lamb of God. He incorporated this myth into many of his later religious teachings. He told his fellow inmates that he had been visited by the Archangel of War, Michael, to lead an uprising against the government. Te Kooti drew extensive parallels between biblical accounts of the Israelites being forced into the desert and the position of instinctive Māori in the 1860 having their land confiscated for holding true to their protocols. He believed his religious mission was to destroy Satan – the government. His mana and understanding of the Bible led many other detainees to reject the Pai Mārire movement and convert to his new faith.

=== Escape and war ===
When most of the Pai Mārire leaders were repatriated to the New Zealand mainland, Te Kooti remained in open detention. In June 1868, Te Kooti's followers seized a vessel and sailed back to the North Island. A guard was killed on the island during the escape. On the voyage home, Te Kooti claimed that his uncle was causing poor sailing weather and ordered one of his followers to throw his uncle overboard. When Te Kooti landed at Gisborne, he released the crew without harm after stealing all the weapons in the ship's armory. Te Kooti told his followers that he was now the King of the Māori, not Tāwhiao. For the next four years, Te Kooti's War raged against Government forces and te Kooti was relentlessly pursued. During this time there were a large number of revenge (utu) attacks on the settlements of Tāwhiao supporters and of Pākehā. Large numbers of people, including women and children were killed, although there is no evidence Te Kooti himself took part in torture and murder. This period added to the Ringatū lore. Te Kooti claimed that his horse had magic powers which enabled him to escape government soldiers.

=== End of the conflict ===
Gradually, under pressure by Gilbert Mair and his largely Māori soldiers, Te Kooti's mainly Ngāi Tūhoe followers were either captured, killed, or deserted until only a handful of supporters remained. Some Tūhoe Ringatū turned against him and guided the soldiers to Te Kooti's hidden camps. He lived in the King Country with permission of the Māori King but relationships was made difficult by te Kooti's lifestyle and beliefs, which was in direct contrast to the sober, conservative life style of the King. In particular, his habit of carrying a loaded revolver, drinking rum and living with many women strained relations with the Māori King Movement. The King could not forget that Te Kooti had earlier challenged his leadership of Māori living in King Country. Gilbert Mair had been given the job of establishing good relationships with the Kingites and he observed firsthand the frosty relationship between te Kooti and Tāwhiao, with the King refusing to acknowledge te Kooti's presence or eat with him.

=== Church growth and Te Kooti's death ===
In 1883 the government pardoned Te Kooti on the condition he refrained from warlike activities. During this time, his personal popularity and following in Ringatū continued to grow. It was at this time that from his base in Te Kūiti much of the Ringatū lore was first written by scribes appointed by Te Kooti and the movement was named "Ringatū". Te Kooti took the opportunity to travel extensively around the North Island preaching as far north as the Hokianga. Wherever he went he was closely observed by the government to ensure he remained peaceful.

In later life, Te Kooti left the King Country sanctuary with a group of followers, mainly women, and headed for his East Coast home where he was still highly unpopular. The New Zealand army was called out and he was arrested at Waioeka Pā near Ōpōtiki and jailed in Auckland for a brief time as he was unable to pay a fine for breaching the peace. On his release, the government gave him some land at te Wainui near Kutarere. While there he was killed in a cart accident.

== The Church today ==
In 1926, Robert (Rapata) Biddle, a Minister and Secretary of this faith, designed the Ringatū seal (crest). The seal consists of the Old and New Testament in the centre, surrounded by the words Te Ture a te Ātua Me te Whakapono Ō Ihu, meaning "The Law of God and the Faith of Jesus". There are also two upraised hands, one on either side of the inner design, and an eagle perched atop the centre ring in reference to the Book of Deuteronomy 32:11–12, where the eagle is compared to God.

Ringatū services are generally held in tribal meeting houses, and the church leaders include a Poutikanga and a tohunga, an expert in church law. Church members read and memorise scripture, chants and hymns.

The 2006 New Zealand census recorded 16,000 members of the Ringatū Church, with a third of them located in the Bay of Plenty.

In 2014, after a thirty-year vacancy, the Church appointed Wirangi Pera as the amorangi (spiritual leader) of the church.

== See also ==
- Season of the Jew (a historical novel that refers to the history of the Ringatū)
- Rātana, another Māori Christian denomination
