= Whanganui campaign =

1847 conflict between colonial settlers and the native Māori people in New Zealand

Wanganui campaign
- Part of the New Zealand Wars
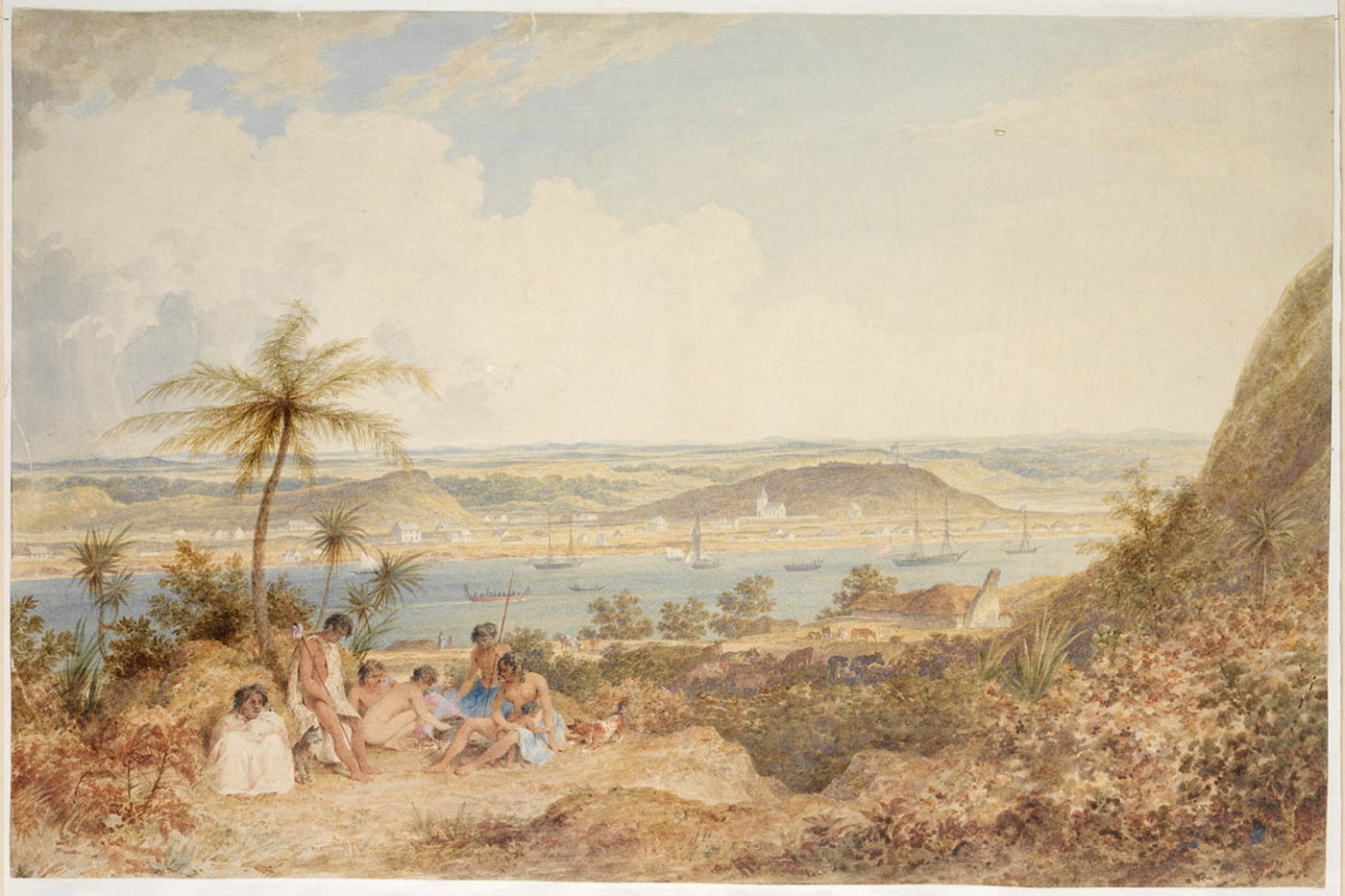
- View of Wanganui, 1847; Artist: John Alexander Gilfillan
Date	16 April – 23 July 1847
Location	New Zealand
Result	Inconclusive

Belligerents
United Kingdom: Colony of New Zealand	Māori

Commanders and leaders
(United Kingdom of Great Britain and Ireland) George Grey (United Kingdom of Great Britain and Ireland) William McCleverty (United Kingdom of Great Britain and Ireland) Joseph Henry Laye (United Kingdom of Great Britain and Ireland) John Hoseason	Topine Te Mamaku; Maketu †; Te Pehi Pakarao; Ngapara

Units involved
(United Kingdom of Great Britain and Ireland) Royal Navy: HMS Inflexible; HMS Calliope; Gunboat; Royal Marines; (United Kingdom of Great Britain and Ireland) British Army: 58th Regiment; 65th Regiment; Ordnance: Royal Engineers; Royal Artillery; HM Treasury: Commissariat; Armed Police; Māori allies: Ngāti Awa; Ngāti Toa	(United Kingdom) Taua: Ngāti Haua-te-rangi; Ngāti Patutokotoko; Ngāti Ruaka

Strength
188 sailors & marines 534 soldiers 1 engineer 22 artillerymen 50 warriors	600 warriors

Casualties and losses
19 May; 0 killed 0 wounded 19 July 4 killed 11 wounded	19 May; 2 killed ≥10 wounded 19 July 5 killed 10–30 wounded

The Whanganui campaign was a brief round of hostilities in the North Island of New Zealand as indigenous Māori fought British settlers and military forces in 1847. The campaign, which included a siege of the fledgling Whanganui settlement (then named "Petre"), was among the earliest of the 19th century New Zealand Wars that were fought over issues of land and sovereignty.

== Background ==
The settlement of Petre, preferably known as "Wanganui" by its settlers, was established by the New Zealand Company in 1840. William Wakefield stated that he had purchased the land for the settlement from the local Māori in November 1839, which some Māori disputed. By 1845, the settlement had grown to about 200 people and about 60 houses. The surrounding area was inhabited by about 4000 Māori, with whom the settlers traded for food. There was nevertheless friction over the occupation of the land, which some Māori chiefs denied having sold, with New Zealand Company surveyors reporting obstruction and harassment.

In March 1846, hostilities broke out in the nearby Hutt Valley over similar issues of disputed land occupation. One of the most prominent fighters in Hutt Valley was Te Mamaku, a principal chief of the Ngāti-Hāua-te-Rangi tribe of the Upper Whanganui. The settlers in Whanganui became worried that the conflict would expand to encompass their region, so requested military protection.

A force made up of the 58th Regiment (5–6 officers, 4 sergeants and 160 men), Royal Artillery (4 men with 2 12-pounder guns on garrison carriages), Royal Engineers (1 officer with tools for 200 men), Commissariat (1 officer with salt provisions for two months and £500), and Medical (1 officer)—landed from HMS Calliope at Wanganui in December 1846 to construct the garrison's stockade. Lieutenant Thomas Bernard Collinson, Royal Engineers, noted:

Dec. 13. We landed in boats at the mouth of the Wanganui River: all the rivers on that coast of Cook's Straits have bar harbours; and had to make 4 miles up to the village. This was rather an exciting march, as we had no idea what sort of reception we should meet; and might have to fight our way. Happily the prestige of the "Hoia" (i.e. Soldiers) was still considerable, and we entered the little settlement in peaceful triumph; to the great joy of the few white settlers.

There, Collinson and Captain Joseph Henry Laye, 58th Regiment, selected the hill pā of Pukenamu at the town's northern end for the Rutland Stockade, and commenced its construction. Another 100 soldiers from the Grenadier Company of the 65th Regiment arrived in May 1847. The York Stockade was built on high ground to the south. The establishment of the garrison led Te Mamaku to anticipate further government intervention. He vowed to fight the soldiers but not the settlers.

== Attack and siege ==
Hapurona Nga Rangi, a minor chief of Putiki, was employed by Midshipman Crozier of the gunboat, to build a house for him in the Rutland stockade. Whilst Nga Rangi collected his wages on 16 April 1847, he suffered a severe gunshot wound to the head from the discharge of Crozier's pistol. The ball passed through his right cheekbone and lodged somewhere in his skull. The shot was claimed to have been accidental and Crozier was restrained whilst the incident was investigated. Nga Rangi was placed under the care of Dr Thomas Moore Philson of the 58th Regiment, and when sufficiently recovered from his wound, confirmed that the shot had been accidental.

A small party of Māori nevertheless decided to exact utu (revenge, or recompense) for the blood-letting. They attacked John Alexander Gilfillan and family at home on 18 April with tomahawks, killing his wife and three of their children, severely wounding Gilfillan and his second daughter, and leaving two infant babies untouched. Five of the six killers were captured by lower Whanganui Māori and handed over to the British; four were court-martialled in Whanganui and hanged at Rutland Stockade. The execution inflamed the situation, prompting a much larger revenge attack.

Between 500 and 600 heavily armed Māori formed a taua (war party) that travelled down the Whanganui River in war canoes in early May, plundering and burning settlers' houses and killing cattle. The warriors killed and mutilated a soldier from the 58th Regiment who ventured out of the town. The town's residents began sleeping in a small group of fortified houses, abandoning their homes each night.

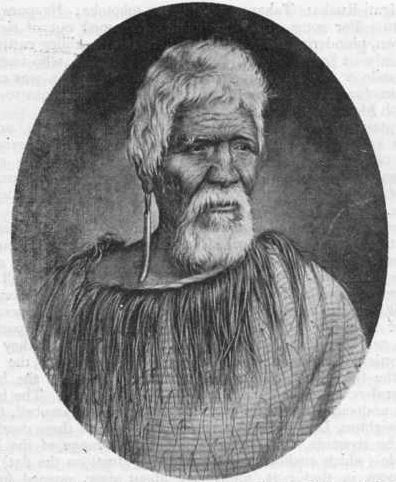
Ngati Haua-te-Rangi chief Te Mamaku

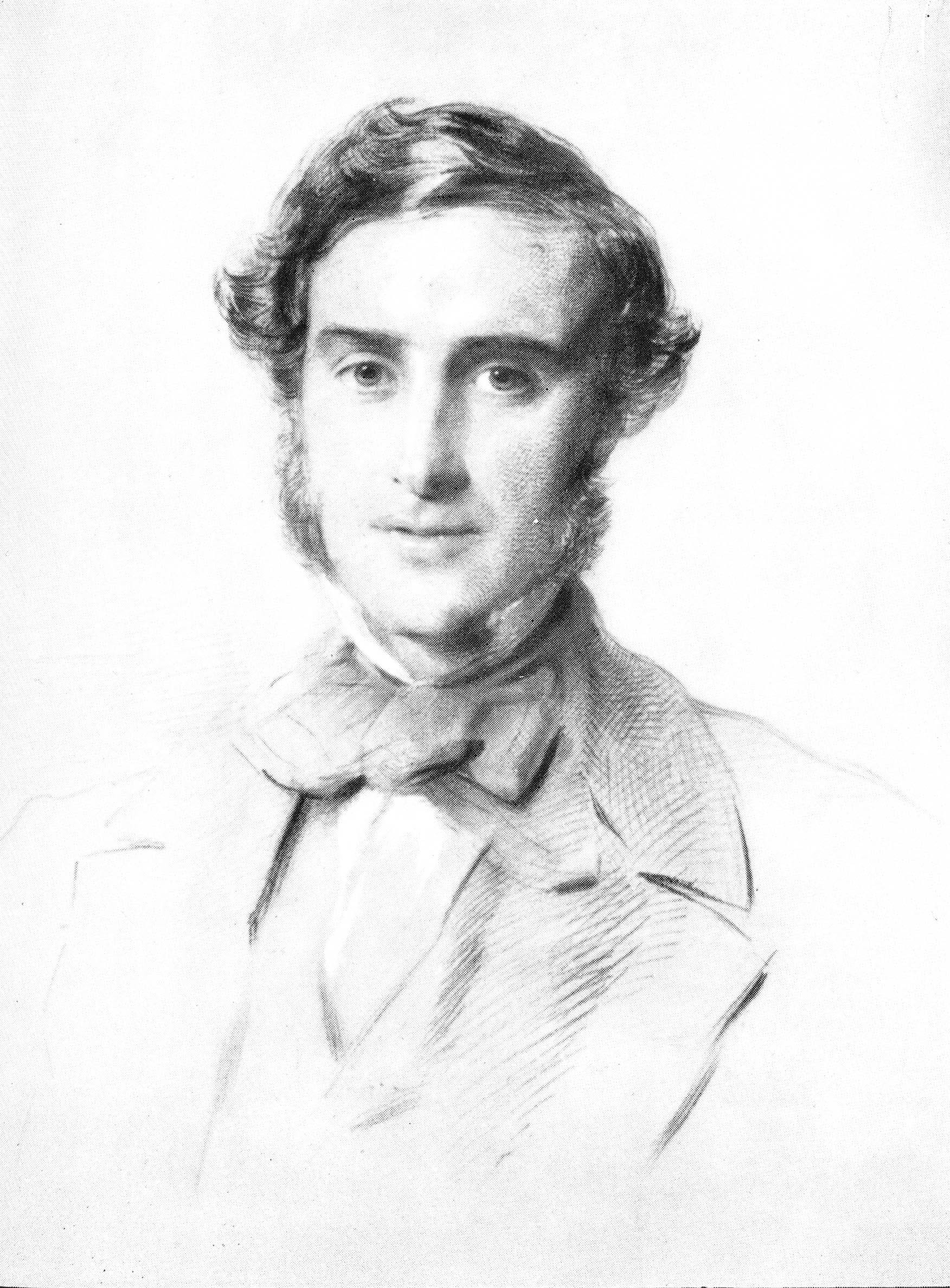
Governor George Grey, 1854

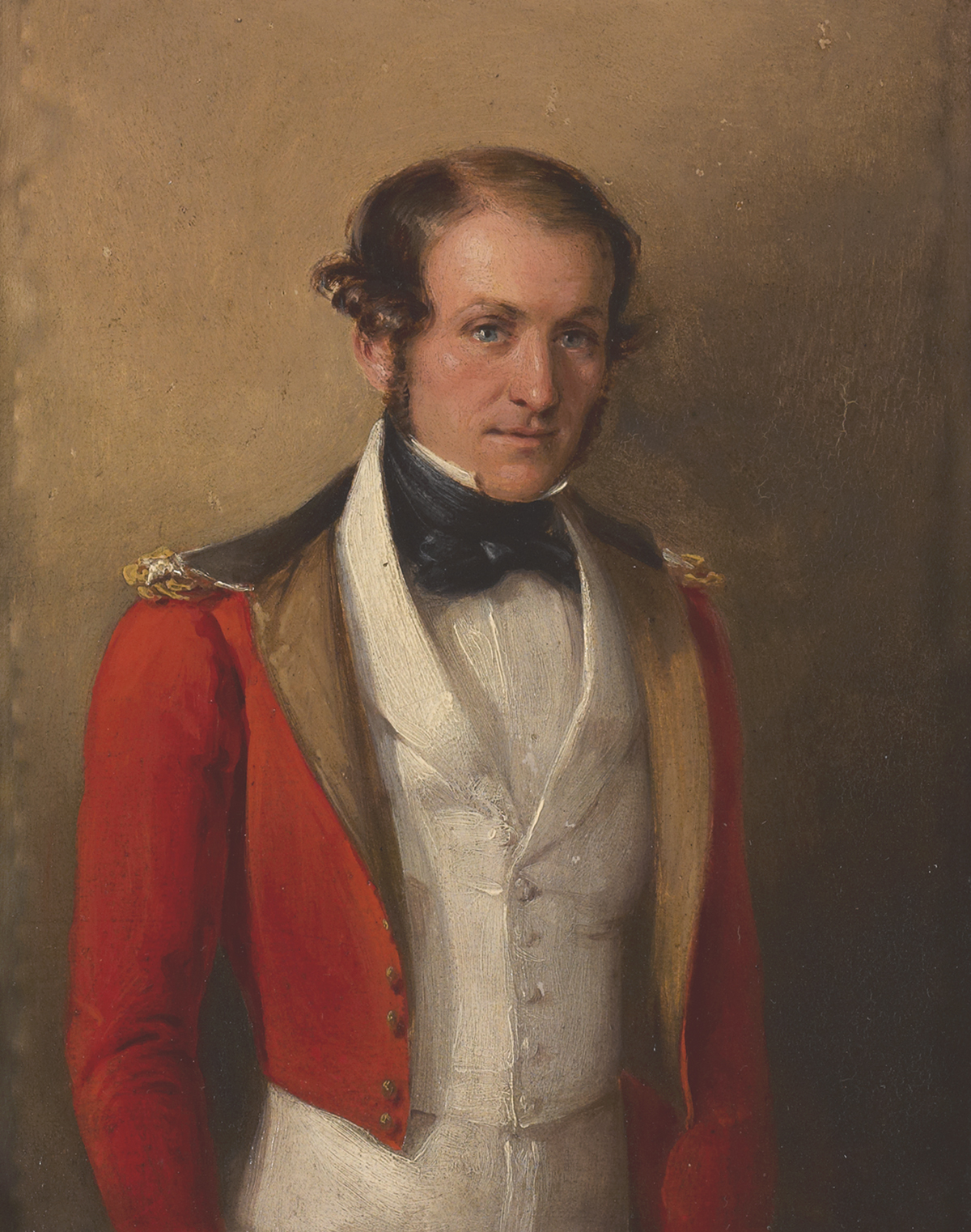
Lieutenant Colonel William McCleverty, c.1852

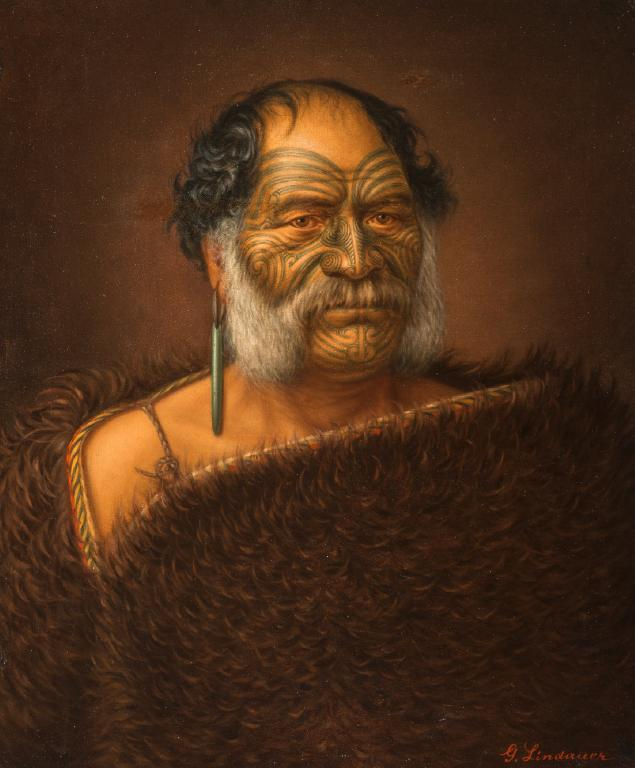
Hori Kingi Te Anaua

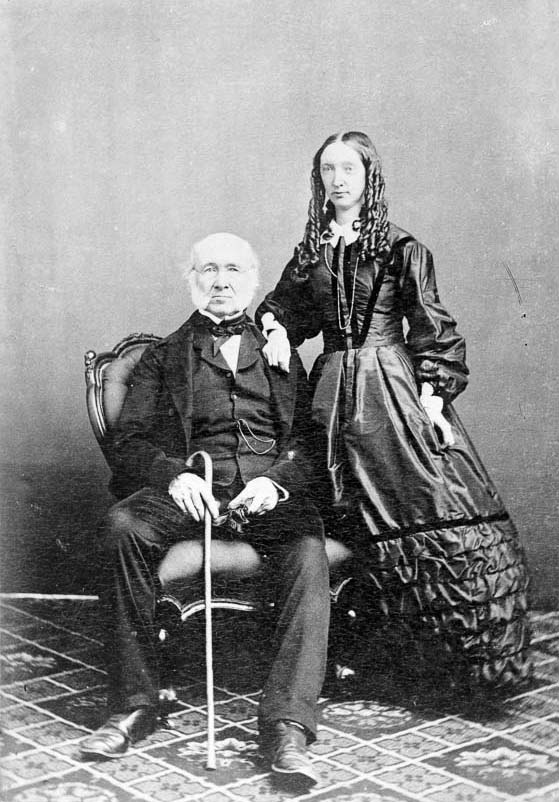
John Alexander Gilfillan and daughter, 1856

On 19 May, Te Mamaku's warriors made their first attack on the town, approaching from the west and north, effectively besieging the settlement. More homes were ransacked. The British gunboat fired from the river, mortally wounding Maketu, a chief. Rockets were fired at besiegers from two armed boats on 24 May when Governor George Grey arrived. The governor was accompanied by Tāmati Wāka Nene, future Māori king Te Wherowhero and several other northern chiefs in a bid to defuse the situation.

In June reconnaissance missions were mounted up the valley of the Whanganui River from the garrison—which now contained 500 to 600 soldiers—resulting in some minor skirmishes. By mid-winter Māori leaders, recognising they had reached a stalemate and conscious that their potato-planting season was approaching, decided to launch a full attack on the town to draw troops from their forts.

On 19 July, some 400 Māori fighters approached the town from the low hills inland, occupying a ridge at St John's Wood where they dug trenches and rifle-pits, then breastworks. About 400 imperial soldiers commanded by William Anson McCleverty became involved in a series of skirmishes along a narrow pathway through swampy ground. After being bombarded with artillery fire, Māori forces charged on the troops, who responded with a bayonet charge, halting the Māori advance. Māori withdrew to the trenches and breastworks, maintaining fire on the British troops until nightfall. Three British soldiers died and one was wounded in the clash; three Māori were killed and about 12 wounded in the so-called Battle of St John's Wood.

On 23 July, Te Mamaku's forces, at least 600 men, returned to their entrenchments on the hill at St John's Wood and planted a red ensign. McCleverty readied his forces to defend the town and move out to engage. The guns opened fire on a few Māori appearing on the low hills, who then retired. The chief of Putiki, granted permission to talk with the opponents, ventured out with the interpreter, Mr Duncan, and spoke with Te Oro, Te Mamaku's brother. He informed them that the Māori would not attack the British positions because of the danger of British artillery fire, and as the soldiers would not attack the Māori entrenchments either, Māori forces would retire the next day. Te Oro said that the Māori were determined not to have peace, but the British commander anticipated that this disengagement would end the war for the winter. Te Mamaku's forces departed the next day; they split into two groups and some fighting between these groups was reported.

Soon after, Wanganui settlers ventured out of town again, returned to their farms, settled matters of cattle losses with their besiegers and re-established trade with them, such that peace was generally established about two months later. In February 1848, with Hōri Kīngi Te Ānaua as interpreter, Grey and Te Mamaku negotiated a peace settlement to the underlying long-unsettled land question. On that matter Collinson observed in 1855:

"Thus ended the last serious disturbance that has occurred in New Zealand up to the present date; and as the peace was confirmed and strengthened in 1848, by the payment of the £1,000 for the land, and the complete concession by the whole of the natives concerned of the block claimed by the New Zealand Company; it may be considered that the peace and prosperity of this populous and troublesome district is as permanently established as that of any settlement in the Colony."

Twelve years of economic cooperation and development followed, with the gradual alienation of yet more Māori land which led to more conflict.
