= 108th Regiment of Foot (Madras Infantry) =

- Active: 1766–1774; 1777–1796; 1854–1881
- Country: East India Company (1766–1858); United Kingdom (1858–1881)
- Branch: Madras Army (1766–1862); British Army (1862–1881)
- Type: Infantry
- Size: One battalion (two battalions 1777–1796)
- Garrison/HQ: 1. Madras Presidency; 2. St Lucia Barracks, Omagh
- Engagements: Indian Rebellion

The 108th Regiment of Foot (Madras Infantry) was an infantry regiment of the British Army. However, it was raised initially as part of the Madras Army, by the East India Company (EIC) in 1766.

In the aftermath of the Indian Rebellion (1857), the British government took control of the Presidency Armies and the 108th became also known by the name 3rd Madras Infantry. Finally, under the Childers Reforms of 1881, the regiment was amalgamated with the 27th (Inniskilling) Regiment of Foot, to form the Royal Inniskilling Fusiliers.

== History ==
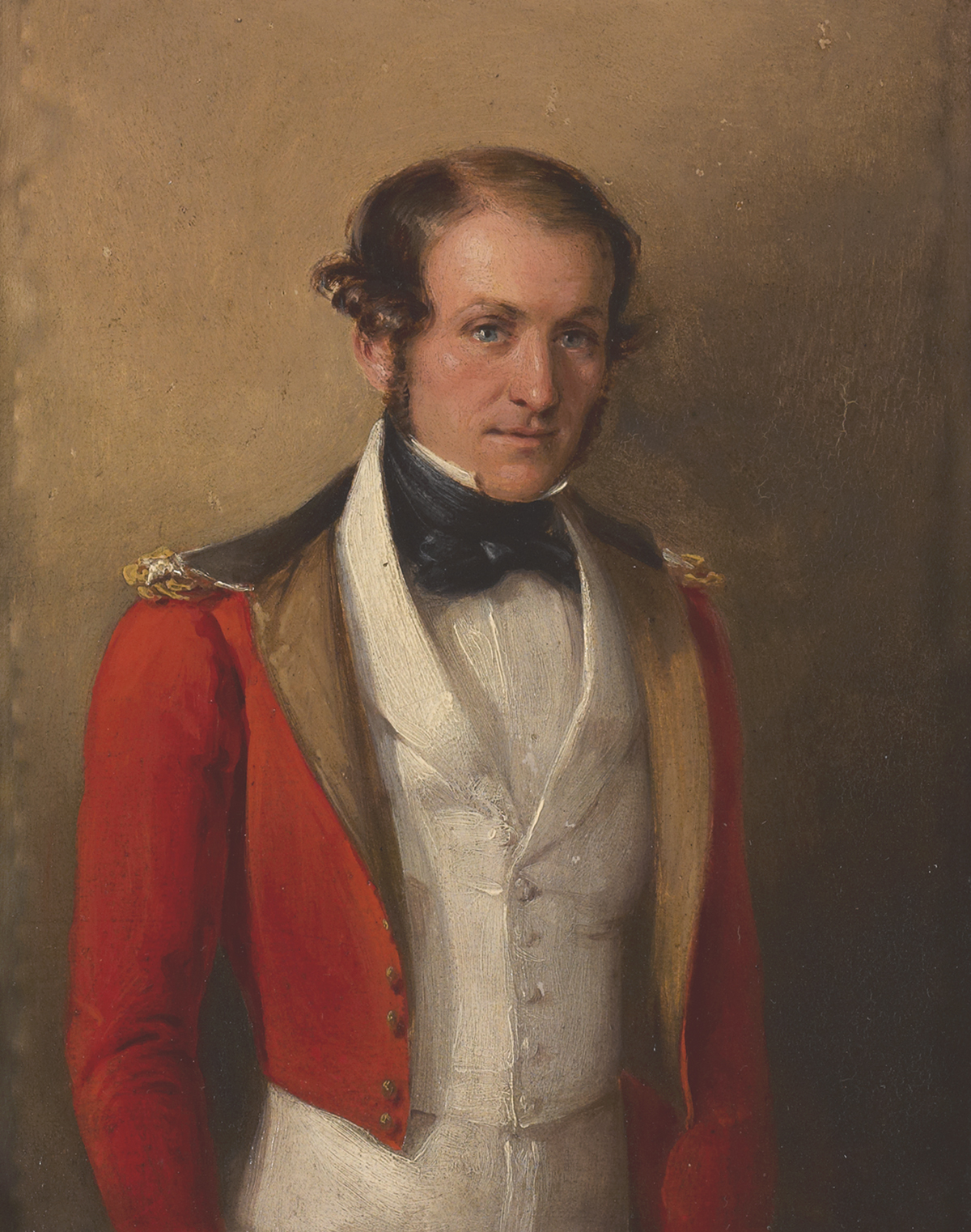
General William McCleverty, colonel of the regiment in the 1860s

=== East India Company ===
The regiment as first raised by the East India Company as the 3rd Madras European Regiment, when it was formed from the 1st Madras Europeans in 1766.

It served in India until 1774, when it was absorbed by the 1st and 2nd Madras Europeans in 1774. Re-raised as a separate regiment in 1777, the 108th was disbanded in 1796. The regiment was re-raised as the 3rd Madras (European) Regiment in 1854, and then saw action in India in 1857 during the Indian Rebellion.

=== British Army ===
After the Crown took control of the Presidency armies in the aftermath of the Indian Rebellion, the regiment became the 3rd Madras Infantry in November 1859. It was then renumbered as the 108th Regiment of Foot (Madras Infantry) on transfer to the British Army in September 1862. It embarked for England in 1876. As part of the Cardwell Reforms of the 1870s, where single-battalion regiments were linked together to share a single depot and recruiting district in the United Kingdom, the 108th was linked with the 27th (Inniskilling) Regiment of Foot, and assigned to district no. 64 at St Lucia Barracks, Omagh.

On 1 July 1881 the Childers Reforms came into effect and the 108th amalgamated with the 27th (Inniskilling) Regiment of Foot to form the Royal Inniskilling Fusiliers.

== Battle Honours ==
Battle honours of the regiment were:

- Central India

== Regimental Colonels ==
Colonels of the Regiment were:

- 1862–1868: Lt-Gen. Sir George Cornish Whitlock, KCB
- 1868: Lt-Gen. Arthur Cunliffe van Notten Pole
- 1868–1875: Gen. William Anson McCleverty
- 1875–1880: Gen. John Hamilton Elphinstone Dalyrmple, CB
- 1880–1881: Gen. Sir Edward Harris Greathed, KCB
