= Rere-ō-maki =

New Zealand Māori leader (died 1868)

Rere-ō-maki (died 1868) was a New Zealand tribal leader. Of Māori descent, she identified with the Te Āti Haunui-a-Pāpārangi iwi. She was born along the Whanganui River in New Zealand. She was the sister of Te Anaua, a leader of Ngāti Ruaka, a subtribe of Te Āti Haunui-a-Pāpārangi. She was the mother of military leader Te Keepa Te Rangihiwinui, also known as Major Kemp.

Rere-ō-maki is one of the few known women to have signed the Treaty of Waitangi, she did so on 23 May 1840 in Whanganui.
