= 27th (Inniskilling) Regiment of Foot =

27th Inniskilling Regiment of Foot
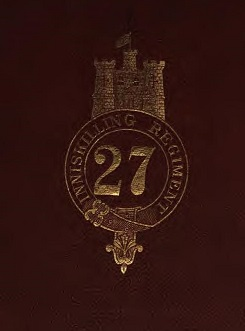
- Badge of the 27th (Inniskilling) Regiment of Foot
- Active: 1689-1881, became Royal Inniskilling Fusiliers
- Country: Kingdom of England (1689–1707); Kingdom of Great Britain (1707–1800); United Kingdom (1801–1881)
- Branch: British Army
- Type: Line Infantry
- Size: Regiment
- Garrison/HQ: St Lucia Barracks, Omagh
- Nickname: The Skins
- Engagements: Battle of the Boyne (1690); Battle of Falkirk Muir (1746); Battle of Culloden (1746); Battle of Maida (1806); Siege of Badajoz (1812); Battle of Salamanca (1812); Battle of Castalla (1813); Battle of Vitoria (1813); Battle of the Pyrenees (1813); Battle of Ordal (1813); Battle of Nivelle (1813); Battle of Orthez (1814); Battle of Toulouse (1814); Battle of Waterloo (1815)

The 27th (Inniskilling) Regiment of Foot was an Irish infantry regiment of the English Army and then the British Army, formed in 1689. Under the Childers Reforms it amalgamated with the 108th (Madras Infantry) Regiment of Foot to form the Royal Inniskilling Fusiliers in 1881.

== History ==
=== Early years ===
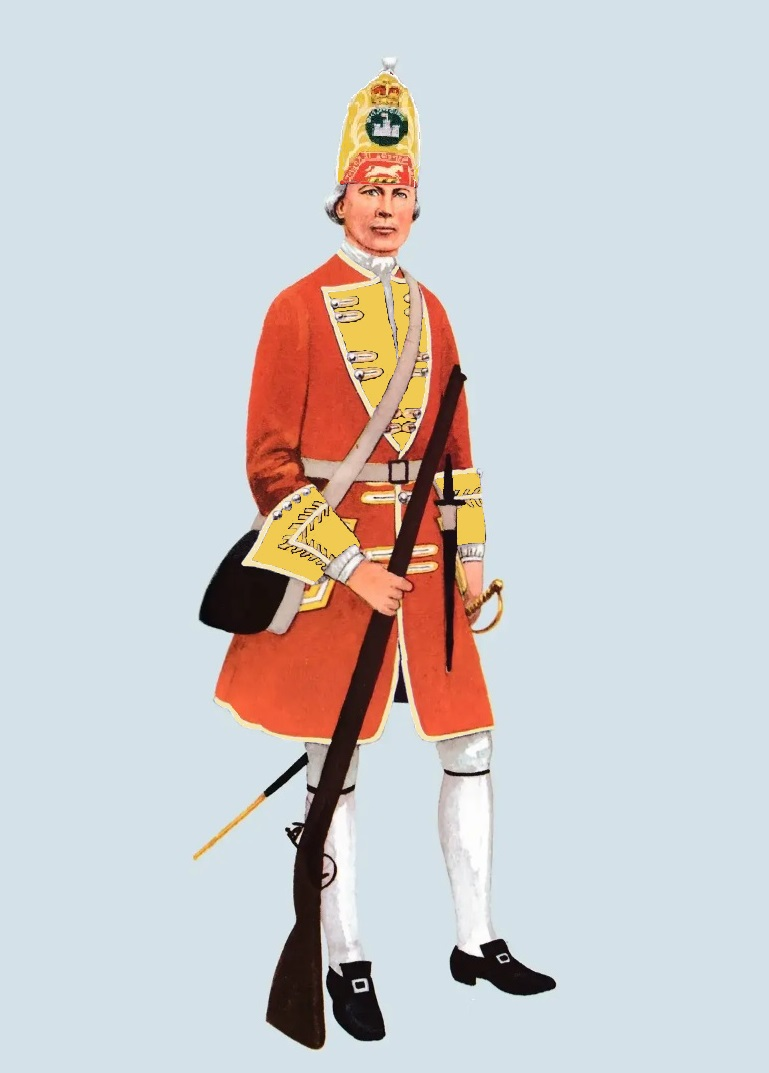
A regimental grenadier in 1715

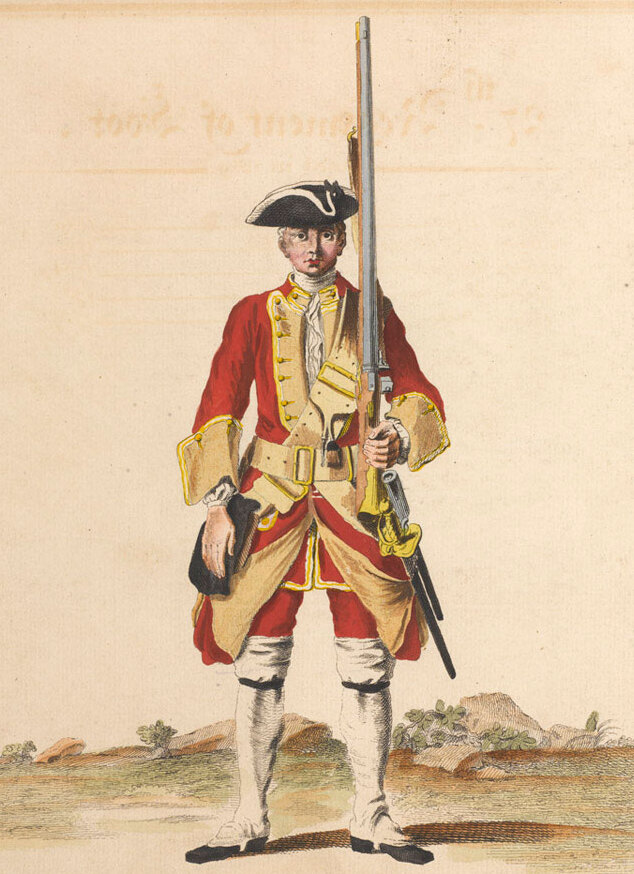
c. 1742 engraving of a regimental private

c. 1751 painting of a regimental grenadier (right)

The regiment was raised as local militia at Enniskillen by Colonel Zachariah Tiffin as Zachariah Tiffin's Regiment of Foot in June 1689, to fight against James II in the Williamite War in Ireland. The regiment served successfully, most notably at the Battle of Newtownbutler in July 1689, and it gained a place on the English establishment in 1690 as a regular infantry regiment. As such it then fought at the Battle of the Boyne in July 1690, at the Battle of Aughrim in July 1691 and at the Siege of Limerick in August 1691. A contingent from the regiment took part in the Siege of Namur in August 1695 during the Nine Years' War.

The regiment was deployed to the West Indies in late 1739 but returned in December 1740. It formed part of the Government army sent to defeat the Jacobite rising of 1745, participating in the Battle of Falkirk in January 1746 and in the Battle of Culloden in April 1746. At this period they were commonly known as Blakeney's Regiment after the colonel-in-chief. In 1751, the regiment was formally titled the 27th (Enniskillen) Regiment of Foot.

In 1756 the regiment departed for Canada and fought against the French at the Battle of Carillon in July 1758 and the Battle of Ticonderoga in July 1759. The following year, the regiment took part in the successful three pronged attack against Montréal in September during the Seven Years' War. It then took part in the Invasion of Martinique in January 1762 and the capture of Grenada in February 1762. It also took part in the Battle of Havana in June 1762 during the Anglo-Spanish War: the regiment suffered heavy losses and was evacuated to New York. In August 1767 the regiment returned to Ireland.

In September 1775 the regiment returned to North America to take part in the American War of Independence, but as the result of the alliance formed by the French with the American colonists, it again found itself involved in numerous expeditions against the French West Indian possessions. The war with France came to an end in 1783 but broke out again ten years later with the French Revolutionary Wars and the regiment took part in the Flanders Campaign of 1793. In 1796 the 27th took Saint Lucia from the French, and its regimental colour was displayed on the flagstaff of the captured fortress at Morne Fortune for an hour before being replaced by the Union Jack.

=== French Revolutionary and Napoleonic Wars ===
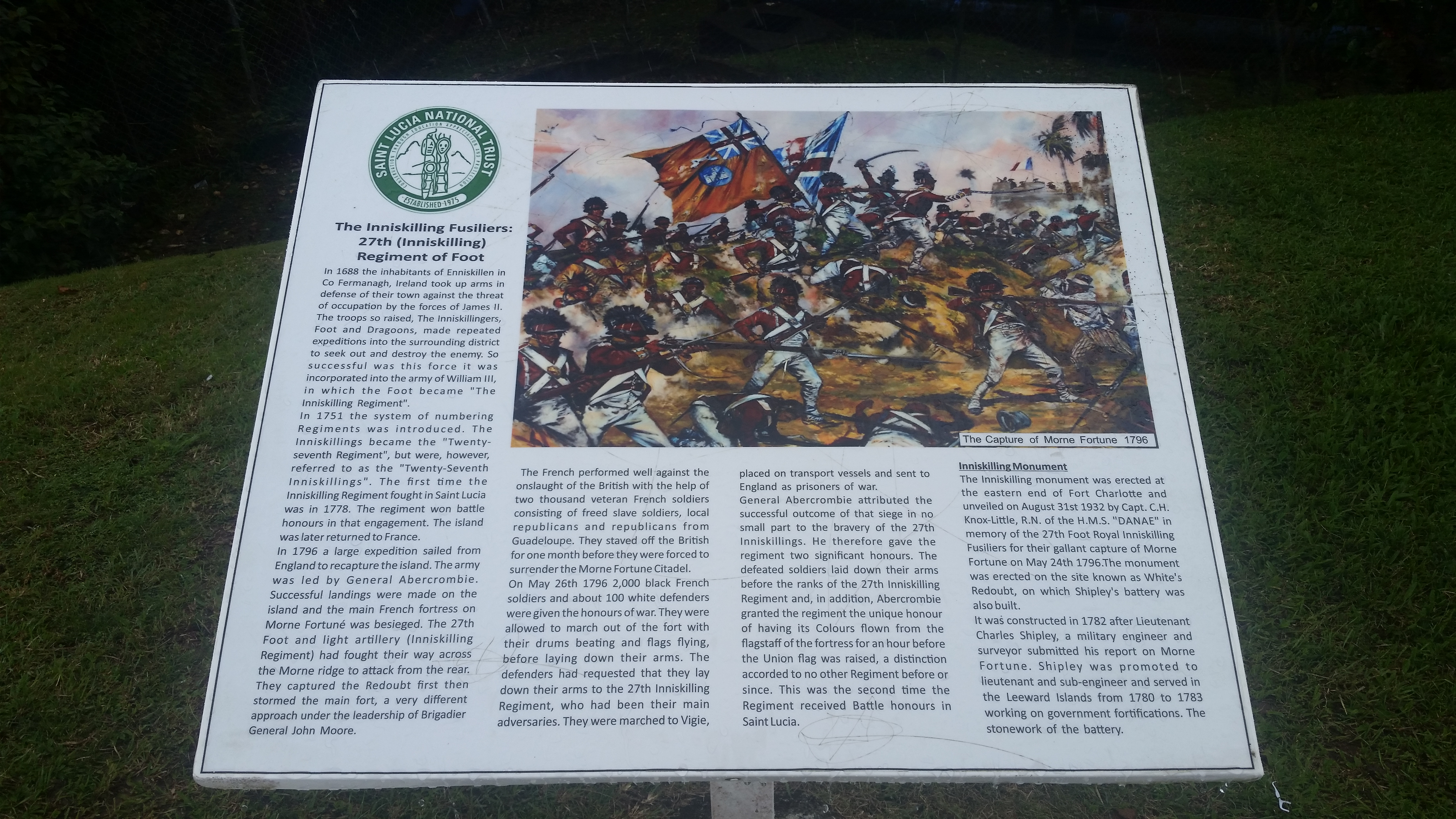
Marker at Morne Fortune detailing the regimental history

The 27th Regiment served throughout the Napoleonic Wars including in Egypt where it formed part of Sir Ralph Abercromby's force that fought the Battle of Alexandria against the French in March 1801, the 2nd Battalion formed part of the garrison of that city after its capture. The 1st Battalion served in the Calabrian campaign and fought at Battle of Maida on 4 July 1806. In this engagement the light company fought in James Kempt's brigade while the one grenadier and eight line companies belonged to Lowry Cole's brigade.

The 1st Battalion entered the Peninsular War in November 1812 and participated in the Battle of Castalla and the Siege of Tarragona, both in 1813. The 2nd Battalion landed in Spain in December 1812 and fought brilliantly at Castalla on 13 April 1813. While formed in a two-deep line, the unit inflicted 369 killed and wounded on the French 121st Line Infantry Regiment in a few minutes. In the same action the entire brigade only lost 70 casualties. On 13 September 1813, the French surprised and cut the 2nd Battalion to pieces at the Battle of Ordal. In this action, the 2nd/27th lost over 360 men killed, wounded, and captured.

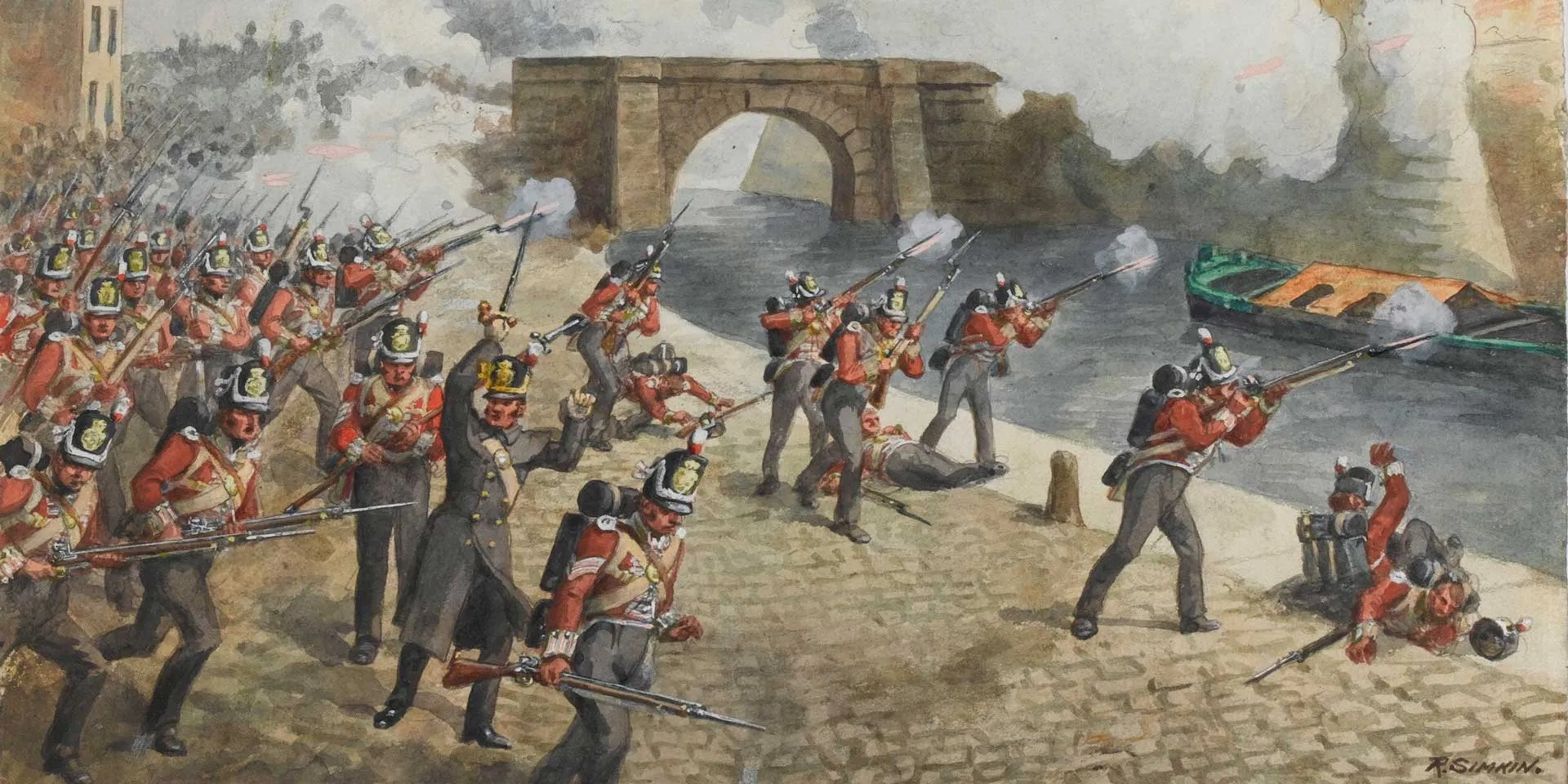
The regiment at the Battle of Toulouse

The 3rd Battalion disembarked in Lisbon in November 1808. It became part of Arthur Wellesley, 1st Duke of Wellington's army and fought at many of the key battles including Badajoz in March 1812, Salamanca in July 1812, Vitoria in June 1813 and the Pyrenees in July 1813 before pursuing the French Army into France and fighting them at Nivelle in November 1813, Orthez in February 1814 and Toulouse in April 1814. The 3rd Battalion belonged to Cole's 4th Division throughout the war. At the Battle of Sorauren (Pyrenees), the 3rd/27th lost two officers and 41 men killed, nine officers and 195 men wounded, and seven men taken prisoner. At Toulouse, the unit lost two officers and 23 men killed, and five officers and 76 men wounded.

The 1st Battalion went on to fight at the Battle of Waterloo as part of John Lambert's 10th Brigade in the 6th Division. At about 6:30 PM, the French captured the key strongpoint of La Haye Sainte farm. After this success, they brought up several cannon and took the Anglo-Allied lines under fire at extremely close range. At this period, the 698-strong battalion was deployed in square at the point where the Ohain road crossed the Charleroi to Brussels highway. At a range of 300 yards (270 m), the French artillery caused the unit enormous casualties within a short time. At day's end, the 1st Battalion had lost 105 killed and 373 wounded, a total of 478 casualties, without breaking. The unit was described as "lying dead in a square". At the time of Waterloo, the soldiers of the 27th were dressed in red, short-tailed jackets, overall trousers, and a high-fronted shako. The facing colour was buff and it was displayed on the collar, cuffs, and shoulder-straps. The lace on the cuffs and jackets had square-ended loops.

=== The Victorian era ===
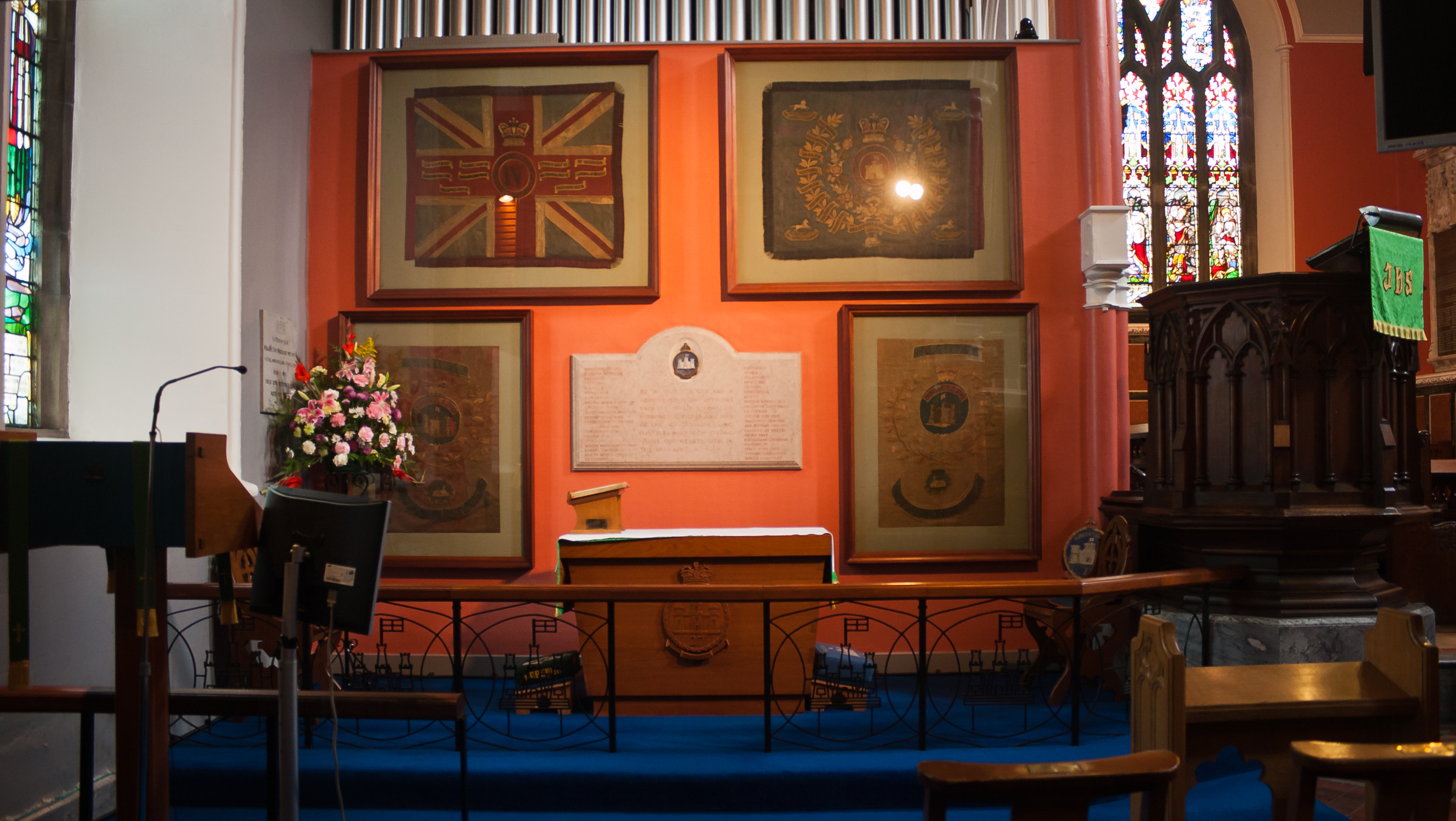
The regimental chapel in the north aisle of St Macartin's Cathedral, Enniskillen decorated with the regiment's colours

Between 1837 and 1847 the 27th Regiment was engaged in several of the Xhosa Wars in South Africa. In 1840, the spelling 'Enniskillen' was changed to 'Inniskilling'. The Gaelic form of the name is Inis Ceithleann ('the Island of Kathleen'), which is captured by various anglicisations. The Regiment was also nicknamed The Skins. From 1854 and 1868 it served in India as part of the suppression of the Indian Mutiny and helped to maintain law and order in North-West India.

As part of the Cardwell Reforms of the 1870s, where single-battalion regiments were linked together to share a single depot and recruiting district in the United Kingdom, the 27th was linked with the 108th (Madras Infantry) Regiment of Foot, and assigned to district no. 64 at St Lucia Barracks, Omagh. On 1 July 1881 the Childers Reforms came into effect and the regiment amalgamated with the 108th (Madras Infantry) Regiment of Foot to form the Royal Inniskilling Fusiliers: the "Twenty-Seventh" became the 1st Battalion Royal Inniskilling Fusiliers, with the 108th (Madras Infantry) Regiment of Foot as the 2nd Battalion.

== Battle honours ==
Battle honours won by the regiment were:

- West Indies: St. Lucia on 24 May 1796
- Napoleonic Wars: Egypt, Maida, Waterloo
- Peninsular War: Badajoz, Salamanca, Vittoria, Pyrenees, Nivelle, Orthes, Toulouse, Peninsula
- Martinique 1762, Havannah, St. Lucia 1778, South Africa 1835, 1846-47 (awarded to successor regiment in 1882 and 1909)

== Regimental Colonels ==
Colonels of the regiment were:

- 1689–1702: Brig-Gen. Zachariah Tiffin
- 1702–1725: Gen. Thomas Whetham
- 1725–1732: F.M. Richard Molesworth, 3rd Viscount Molesworth
- 1732–1737: Lt-Gen. Archibald Hamilton
- 1737–1761: Lt-Gen. William Blakeney, 1st Baron Blakeney

27th (Inniskilling) Regiment of Foot - (1751)

- 1761–1771: Gen. Hugh Warburton
- 1771–1773: Lt-Gen. Sir Eyre Coote, KB
- 1773–1804: Gen. Eyre Massey, 1st Baron Clarina
- 1804–1826: Gen. Sir Francis Rawdon-Hastings, 1st Marquess of Hastings, KG, GCB, GCH
- 1826–1842: Gen. Hon. Sir Galbraith Lowry Cole, GCB
- 1842–1848: Lt-Gen. Sir John Maclean, KCB
- 1848–1853: Gen. Sir William Francis Patrick Napier, KCB
- 1853–1860: Lt-Gen. Edward Fleming, CB
- 1860–1864: Lt-Gen. John Geddes, KH
- 1864–1870: Gen. James Robertson Craufurd
- 1870–1881: Gen. Randal Rumley

== Sources ==
- Gates, David (2002). The Spanish Ulcer: A History of the Peninsular War. London: Pimlico. ISBN 0-7126-9730-6.
- Glover, Michael (2001). The Peninsular War 1807-1814. London: Penguin. ISBN 0-14-139041-7.
- Hamilton-Williams, David (1994). Waterloo - New Perspectives: The Great Battle Reappraised. NY: John Wiley & Sons. ISBN 0-471-05225-6.
- Haythornthwaite, Philip J. (1974). Uniforms of Waterloo. NY: Hippocrene Books. ISBN 0-88254-283-4.
- Royle, Trevor (2014). Britain's Lost Regiments. Aurum Press. ISBN 978-1781311882.
- Smith, Digby (1998). The Napoleonic Wars Data Book. London: Greenhill Books. ISBN 1-85367-276-9.
- Trimble, Copeland (1876). Historical record of the 27th (Inniskilling) Regiment from the period of its institution as a volunteer corps till the present time. William Clowes.
