= Te Mamaku =

New Zealand Māori chief

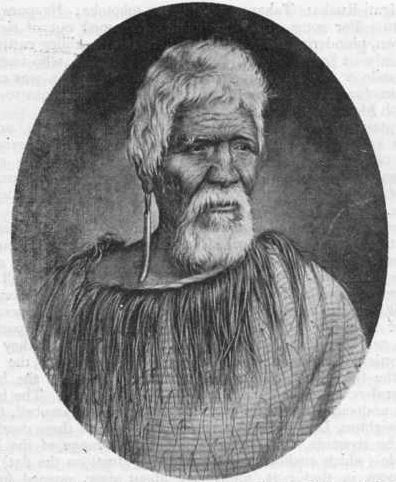
Te Mamaku

Hēmi Tōpine Te Mamaku (died June 1887) was a Māori chief in the Ngāti Hāua-te-rangi iwi from the Whanganui region of New Zealand's North Island.

Te Mamaku was born probably in the late 18th century and raised in the Whanganui area. As tribal chief he commanded a pā at Tuhua, at a strategic position on the Ohura River, north of Taumarunui.

During the Musket Wars Te Mamaku was sometimes allied with Ngāti Toa chief Te Rauparaha and sometimes fought against him. At the outbreak of the Hutt Valley Campaign in 1846, he was firmly on the side of Te Rauparaha's nephew Te Rangihaeata in resisting the encroachment of European settlers on to Māori land. On 16 May 1846, Te Mamaku led a force of about 200 warriors in a devastating surprise dawn attack on British troops at Boulcott's Farm in the Hutt Valley. Afterwards, he sent letters to other chiefs in the Whanganui area urging them to join in the conflict. Some were intercepted and forwarded to the government, which may have precipitated George Grey's decision to arrest Te Rauparaha.

Returning to Wanganui (then known as Petre) in September 1846, Te Mamaku told the 200 European settlers that he had no quarrel with them and would protect them from attack by other Māori, but that he would not tolerate the presence of government troops. The government sent troops there in December.

In April 1847, four Māori were hanged for the murder of the Gilfillan settler family. Te Mamaku believed they should have been handed over for tribal justice. Raids on the outlying farms intensified, and in May, Te Mamaku led a war party of up to 700 warriors that besieged the town. A battle on 20 July resulted in about a dozen casualties on each side, after which the siege was lifted and Te Mamaku returned to his stronghold in the Pipiriki area, up the Whanganui River.

Te Mamaku was baptised by Richard Taylor and took the baptismal name Hēmi Tōpine (James Stovin) on 25 December 1853.

In 1857, Te Mamaku was offered the Māori kingship, but declined. He did join the Kingitanga movement in 1858 in their opposition to the sale of Māori land. He did not get involved in the Battle of Moutoa Island, but was probably fighting alongside the Pai Mārire forces at Ōhoutahi in the Second Taranaki War.

Despite this, within a few years, he was regarded as a man of peace and had the respect of the government. He opposed Te Kooti but was firm in his belief that the King Country was sacrosanct Māori territory, even to the extent of executing one Pākehā man who persisted in entering the area. In 1880, he joined Te Keepa te Rangihiwinui in a trust to protect the Māori land of the upper Wanganui River from sale to the Pākehā.

In his later years, Te Mamaku appears to have accepted many of the changes that Europeanisation brought to his area. He died in June 1887 at Tāwhata, near Taumarunui.
