= St Lucia Barracks, Omagh =

Former military base in Northern Ireland

St Lucia Barracks
- Omagh
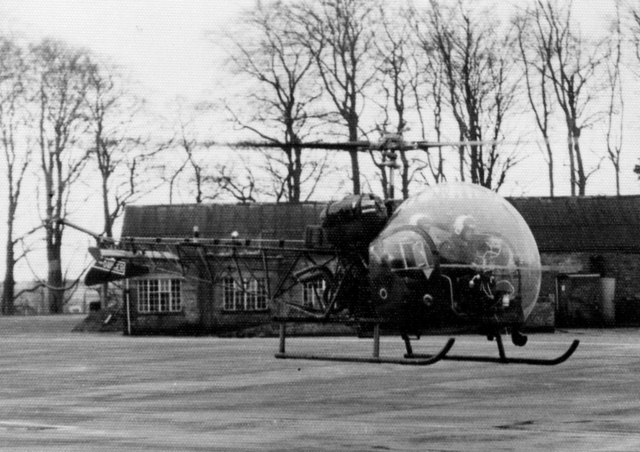
- A helicopter landing at the base in the 1960s

Site information
- Type: Barracks
- Owner: Ministry of Defence
- Operator: British Army

Location
- Location within Northern Ireland
- Coordinates: 54°36′14″N 07°18′25″W

Site history
- Built: 1875-1881
- Built for: War Office
- In use: 1881-2007

St Lucia Barracks, Omagh, is a former military base in Omagh, County Tyrone, Northern Ireland.

== History ==
The War Office leased the 5-acre (20,000 m^{2}) site from the Archdale family on 10 April 1875 for sixty pounds per annum. The lease was made for 999 years or until the War Office ceased to use it for military purposes or sublet, assigned the premises for use other than military. The Ministry of Defence still holds the original lease. The site was acquired as part of the Cardwell Reforms, which encouraged the localisation of British military forces. The barracks became the depot for the 27th (Inniskilling) Regiment of Foot and the 108th (Madras Infantry) Regiment of Foot. Following the Childers Reforms, the 27th and 108th regiments amalgamated to form the Royal Inniskilling Fusiliers with its depot in the barracks in 1881.

In 1924, the barracks also became the depot of the Royal Irish Fusiliers. An Auxiliary Territorial Service camp was established during the Second World War, and Lisanelly Camp was built on an adjacent site.

In October 1954, an attempted IRA raid on the barracks to capture weapons failed, with five soldiers and two IRA men injured. Eight men were arrested and convicted, with sentences of 10–12 years imprisonment.

The base was the subject of a botched proxy bomb attack on 24 October 1990, when the main charge of the bomb failed to explode. On 7 December 1992, two sangars received harassing fire from automatic weapons when an IRA unit attacked the base. St Lucia Barracks closed in 2007 as part of the demilitarisation of Northern Ireland according to the terms of the Good Friday Agreement. Eventually, an environmentally friendly PSNI station was built on the grounds next to the existing St Lucia Barracks site in 2010.

== Sources ==
- English, Richard (2005). Armed struggle: the history of the IRA. Oxford University Press. ISBN 0-19-517753-3.
