= William Anson McCleverty =

General William Anson McCleverty
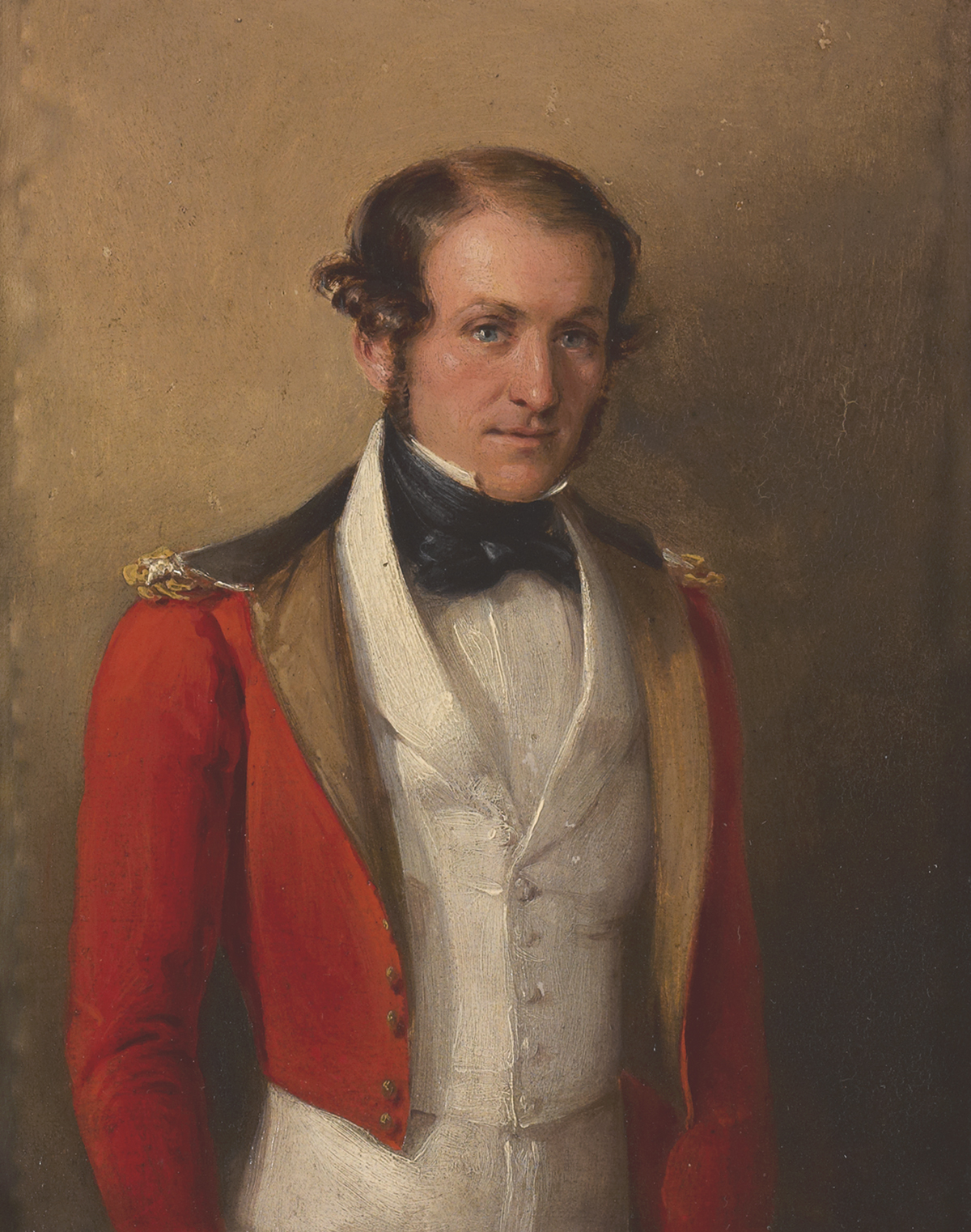
- William Anson McCleverty, c. 1852; National Army Museum
- Born: 11 February 1806; Chatham, Kent
- Died: 6 October 1897 (aged 91); Wrotham, Kent, England
- Spouse: Anne McGildowney (m. 1846–1868)
- Military career
- Allegiance: United Kingdom
- Branch: British Army
- Service years: 1824–
- Rank: General
- Units: 48th Regiment, 1824– Northamptonshire Regiment, 1881–
- Commands: New Zealand, 1847; Madras Army, 1867–1871
- Campaigns: Coorg War; New Zealand Wars; Wanganui campaign
- Awards: New Zealand War Medal

General William Anson McCleverty (11 February 1806 – 6 October 1897) was a British soldier who served as the Commander-in-Chief of the Madras Army from 1867 to 1871.

== Early life ==
Born the son of Major General Robert McCleverty, McCleverty was commissioned in the 48th Regiment of Foot in 1824.

== Military career ==
McCleverty served in campaigns against the Maharajah of Coorg (1834) and in New Zealand during the Wanganui Campaign (1847). He lived in New Zealand from 1846 to 1857, and later returned to New Zealand for another period. Promoted to major-general, he became commander of Madras district in 1860, General Officer Commanding South-Eastern District in October 1866 and Commander-in-Chief of the Madras Army in November 1867 before retiring from that post in March 1871.

From 1868 to 1875 he held the colonelcy of the 108th (Madras Infantry) Regiment of Foot from which he transferred as colonel in 1875 to the 48th (Northamptonshire) Regiment of Foot, continuing on its amalgamation in 1881 as colonel of the 1st Battalion of the resultant Northamptonshire Regiment, a position he held until his death. He was promoted to the rank of general on 17 March 1876.

McCleverty died on 6 October 1897 at the age of ninety-one.

== Art ==
McCleverty painted in watercolours and several of his works are held by the Alexander Turnbull Library in Wellington and the National Library of Australia in Canberra.

Military offices
Preceded by Sir Robert Garrett	GOC South-Eastern District; 1866–1867	Succeeded by Charles Ellice
Preceded by Sir John Le Marchant	C-in-C, Madras Army; 1867–1871	Succeeded by Sir Frederick Haines
