= Thomas Moore Philson =

Doctor and hospital superintendent

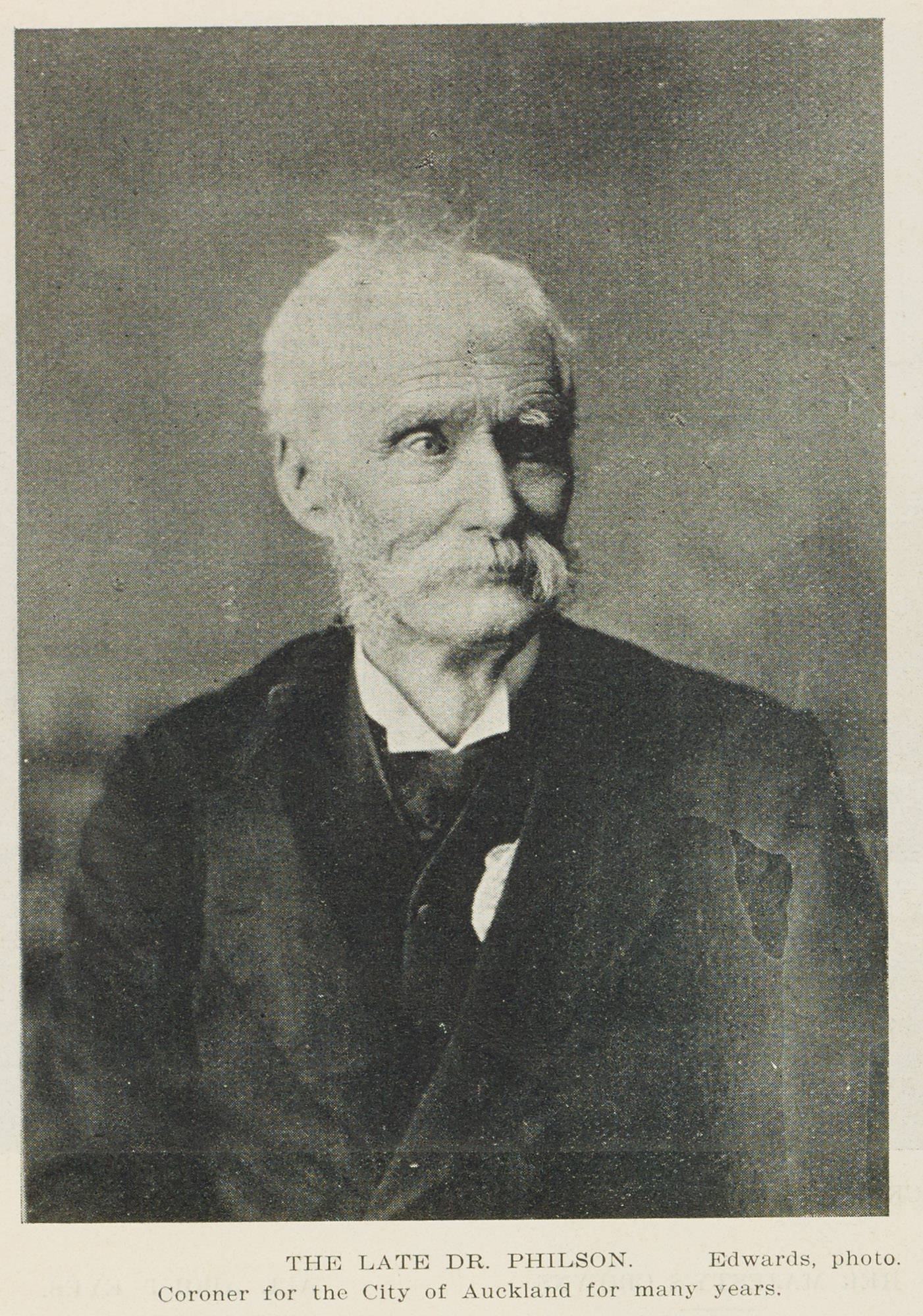
- Philson in 1899
- Born: 10 August 1817; Derry, County Londonderry, Ireland
- Died: 22 November 1899 (aged 82); Auckland, New Zealand
- Burial place: Symonds Street Cemetery, Auckland
- Spouse: Matilda Willmet Anderson (m. 1844)
- Military career
- Allegiance: United Kingdom
- Branch: (United Kingdom of Great Britain and Ireland) British Army
- Years of service: 1843–1851
- Rank: Assistant Surgeon
- Unit: 58th (Rutlandshire) Regiment
- Campaigns: New Zealand Wars; Flagstaff War; Ruapekapeka, 1846; Whanganui campaign, 1847
- Other work: Coroner, Auckland Province; Provincial Surgeon, Auckland Province; Superintendent, Auckland Hospital; Surgeon to Gaol, Auckland

Thomas Moore Philson (10 August 1817 – 22 November 1899) was a New Zealand medical doctor and superintendent of Auckland Hospital. The Philson Library at the University of Auckland Medical School is named after him.

== Early life and education ==
Philson was born in Derry, County Londonderry, Ireland in 1817. His father Matthew Philson was a maths teacher. At age 17 in he attended the University of Edinburgh, winning the Ballingall Prize for military surgery and graduating MD and MRCS in 1839. His MD thesis was entitled On Croup.

== Career ==
Philson practised medicine in Gloucestershire for three years. On 6 October 1843 he was commissioned with the rank of assistant surgeon in the 58th (Rutlandshire) Regiment of Foot sailing on the Ann to Sydney. He arrived in the Bay of Islands, New Zealand, on the British Sovereign from Sydney, with fellow officers and 214 soldiers of the 58th, in October 1845. He served as the medical officer at the Battle of Ruapekapeka in 1846 before the regiment moved to the campaigns in Wellington and Whanganui.

After his military career ended in 1851, he set up a private practice in Auckland though he maintained some appointments as a surgeon in the defence forces, including Brigade surgeon to the New Zealand Defence Forces. Despite his relative youth, within a decade, he held all important administrative medical positions in Auckland: coroner from 1858, port medical officer from 1860, surgeon to the Fort Cautley prison, Mt Eden Jail and the asylum, and surgeon and superintendent of Auckland Hospital from 1859.

Philson held the position at Auckland Hospital for 24 years until his resignation in 1883 after which he remained as an honorary staff member. He was forced to retire as his right hand had become disabled from several bouts of sepsis acquired while doing surgery. Philson wrote extensive case notes and reports on diseases, post-mortems and the condition of the hospital. The facilities and conditions at the hospital, including the water supply were grossly inadequate and from 1868 he advocated for a new hospital which opened in 1877. Philson, like other contemporary physicians, had little or no understanding of the cause and transmission of diseases such as typhoid, dysentery, venereal diseases, scurvy, pneumonia and bronchitis however he strived to offer care even when there was no cure. He was reluctant to press patients to pay for their treatments and cared for patients regardless of their financial status.

Philson's altruism and "devotion to duty" were well known and demonstrated when in 1872 a ship arrived in Auckland from Sydney carrying a sailor with smallpox. Having had smallpox Philson attended the sick man and on his death arranged his funeral in order to prevent the disease from spreading.

On his retirement he was presented with gifts including 270 sovereigns which he used to create a trust fund to set up a medical library for students. When the University of Auckland's medical school was opened the medical library was named the Philson Library.

== Personal life ==
In 1844 he married Matilda Willmet Anderson in Kent. They had six daughters and three sons. He was a founder of the Baptist Church in Auckland.

Philson died in Auckland on 22 November 1899.

== Gallery ==
Philson's military uniform items

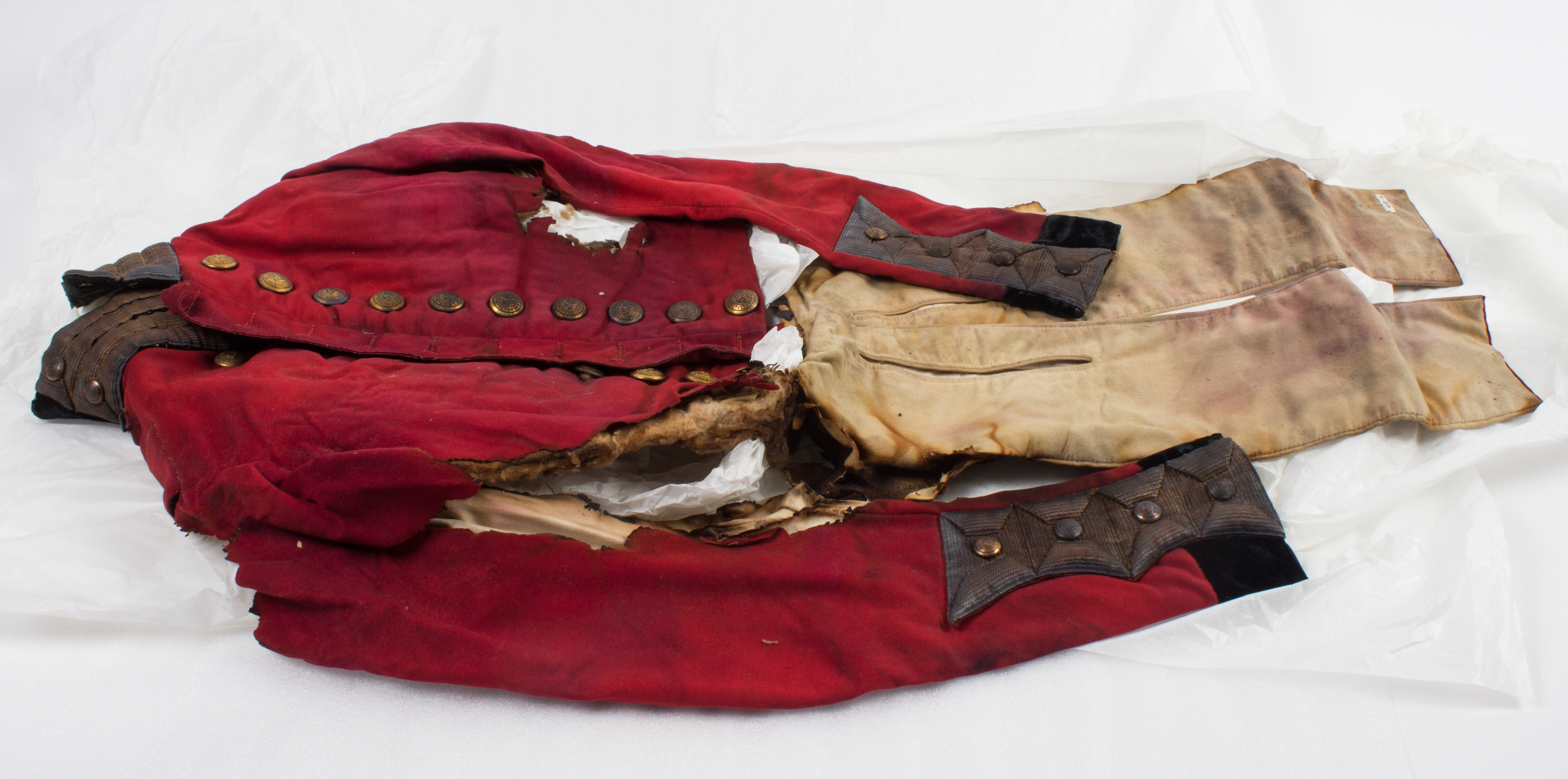
58th Regt coatee worn by Asst Surg Thomas Philson, MD.
Auckland Museum

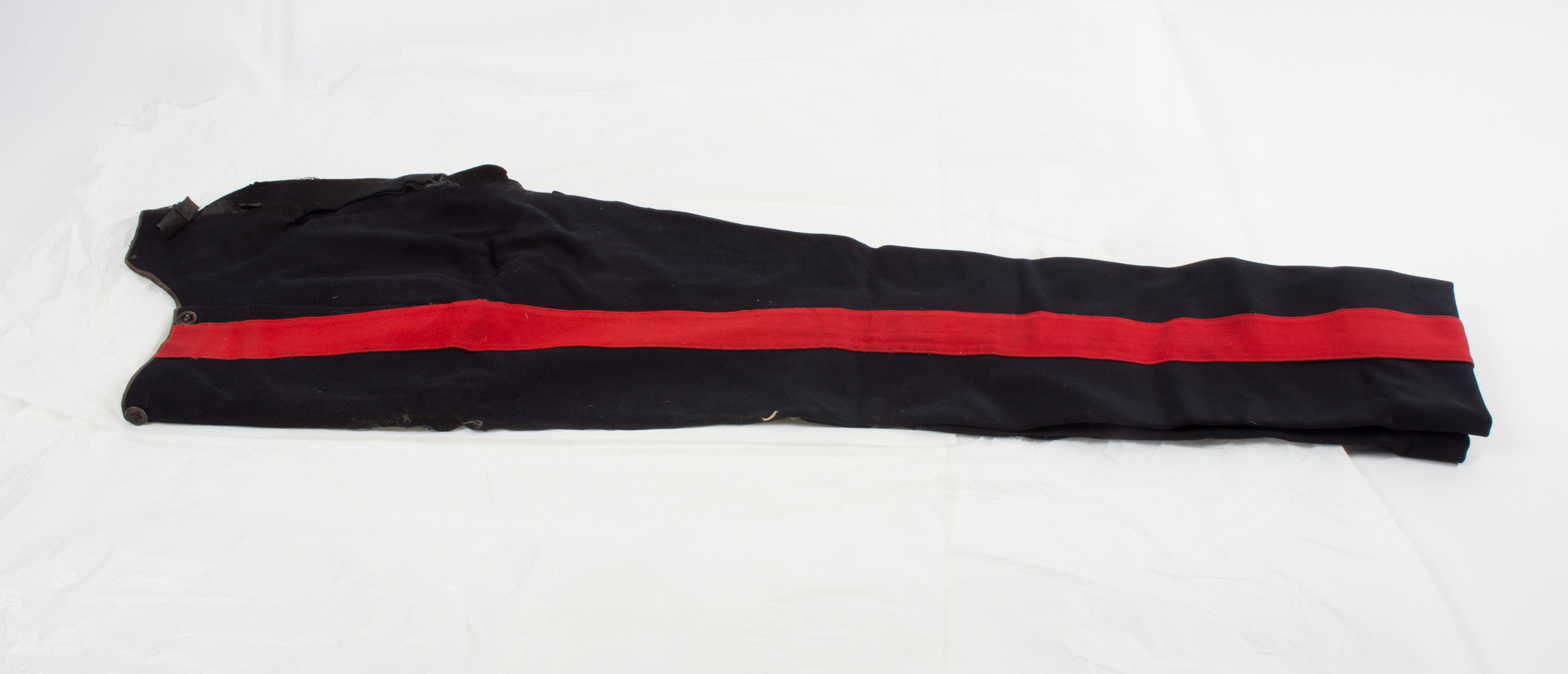
Military trousers worn by Asst Surg Thomas Philson, MD.
Auckland Museum

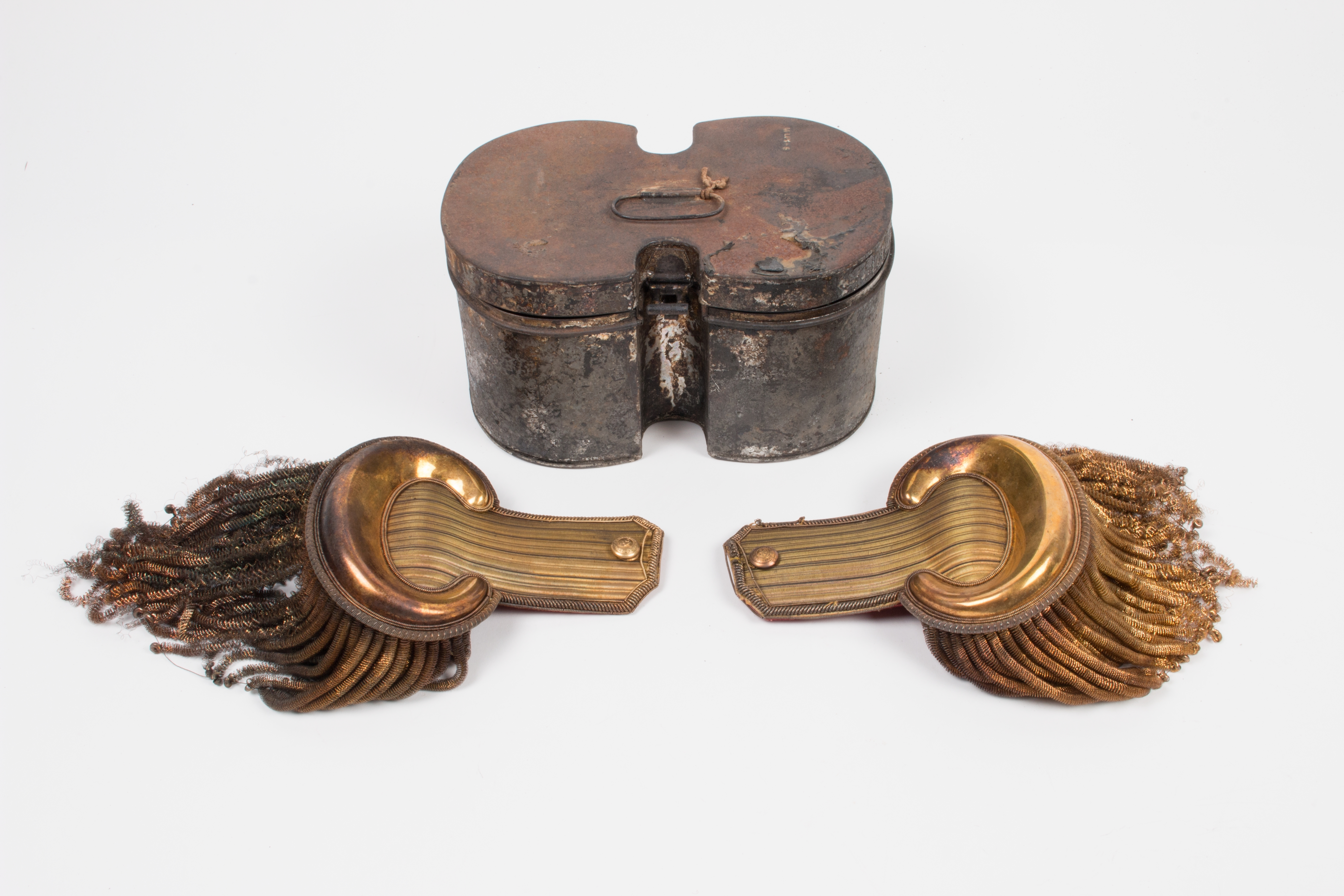
Epaulettes worn by Asst Surg Thomas Philson, MD.
Auckland Museum
