= Hutt Valley campaign =

Armed conflict in New Zealand

- Part of New Zealand Wars
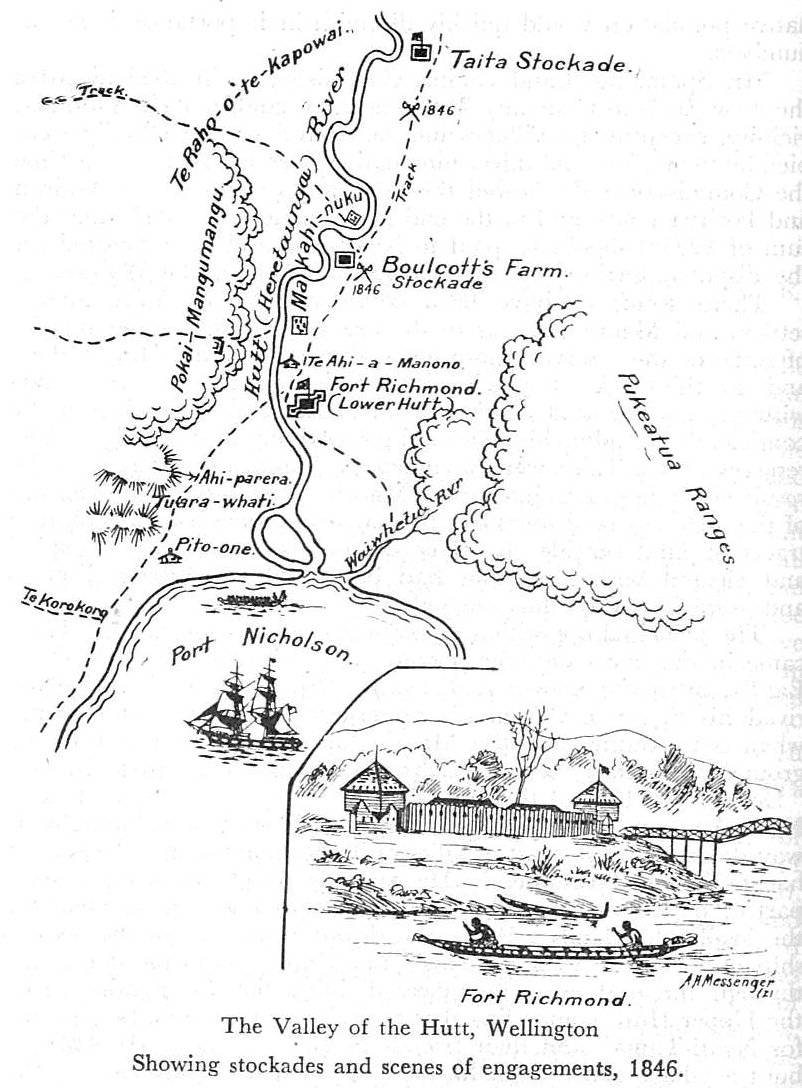
- Locations of the major engagements of the Hutt Valley campaign
Date	3 March – August 1846
Location	Hutt Valley, New Zealand
Result	British victory

Belligerents
United Kingdom: Colony of New Zealand	Ngāti Toa; Ngāti Rangatahi; Ngāti Hāuaterangi

Commanders and leaders
(United Kingdom of Great Britain and Ireland) William Hulme (United Kingdom of Great Britain and Ireland) Edward Last; Rawiri Puaha	Te Rangihaeata; Topine Te Mamaku

Units involved
(United Kingdom of Great Britain and Ireland) Royal Navy: HMS Castor; HMS Calliope; HMS Driver; Royal Marines; (United Kingdom of Great Britain and Ireland) British Army: 58th Regiment; 65th Regiment; 96th Regiment; 99th Regiment; Ordnance: Royal Engineers; Royal Artillery; Militia: Hutt Company, Wellington Battalion; Police; Māori allies: Rawiri Puaha	

The Hutt Valley campaign was an armed conflict in the lower North Island of New Zealand between indigenous Māori and British settlers and military forces in 1846. The campaign was among the earliest of the 19th century New Zealand Wars that were fought over issues of land and sovereignty. It was preceded by the Wairau affray (June 1843) and followed by the Wanganui campaign (April–July 1847) and was triggered by much the same pressures—the careless land purchasing practices of the New Zealand Company, armed government support for settler land claims, and complex intertribal tensions between local Māori. The three conflicts also shared many of the same combatants.

The campaign's most notable clashes were the Māori dawn raid on an imperial stockade at Boulcott's Farm in the Hutt Valley on 16 May 1846 in which eight British soldiers and at least two Māori died, and the Battle of Battle Hill from 6–13 August as British troops, local militia and kūpapa Māori pursued a Ngāti Toa force led by chief Te Rangihaeata through steep and dense bushland. Ngāti Toa chief Te Rauparaha was taken into custody during the campaign; he was detained without charge in Auckland for two years.

A 2003 report by the Waitangi Tribunal concluded the New Zealand Company's 1839 land purchases were invalid and that the Crown committed a number of breaches of the 1840 Treaty of Waitangi in subsequent dealings with Māori in the area.

== Background to war ==
Tensions rose in the mid-1840s as settlers and Māori were left to deal with the consequences of haphazard and often dubious land purchases by the New Zealand Company. The boundaries of purchased land and Māori reserves were often only vaguely indicated, creating confusion and conflict. The company's purchasing agents seldom questioned the right of vendors to sell the land, whose possession even Māori disputed among themselves and Māori who lived in the Hutt Valley under customary rights were forcefully evicted by the government with little or no compensation for their homes and extensive cultivations.

=== New Zealand Company land dealings ===
The Heretaunga (Hutt Valley) area had been lightly and sporadically populated until the 1830s by a number of small tribes (or hapu), which were driven out during successive waves of migration from northern invaders, ultimately leaving the area in the control of Te Rauparaha of Ngāti Toa, who in turn had granted rights of occupation to Ngāti Rangatahi.

Ngāti Mutunga had established ahi kā, or a long historical association with the area and was therefore in a position to sell land, but had departed by September 1839, when the New Zealand Company vessel Tory arrived at Port Nicholson to purchase land for its settlements.

Unaware of these complexities, and disregarding advice that Te Rauparaha had conquered all the land around Cook Strait and was widely accepted by those who lived on the land as the final owner, the New Zealand Company distributed payment to six chiefs for vast, but poorly defined (Note: In its 2003 report on the Wellington District, the Waitangi Tribunal wrote (pg 57): "The boundary of the purchase was described, though in a scarcely intelligible way. It can be summarised as running north from Turakirae Head along the summit of the Rimutaka Range to the head of the Hutt Valley, then south-west across the base of the Tararua Range, then along the summit of the ‘Rimarap’ Range (to the west of Te Whanganui a Tara) until it reached the sea at Cook Strait outside the western headland of Te Whanganui a Tara at Rimurapa (Sinclair Head), and then back to Turakirae. Because of the inadequacy of the boundary’s description, it is impossible to make an accurate map of the lands included in the deed, and it appears that the signatories were not shown a plan of the purchase.") expanses of land in the Port Nicholson (Wellington) area. (Note: The Port Nicholson deed was marked by 16 Māori on 27 September 1839. A list of signatories and their Pas provided to the Spain commission in February 1843 contained 14 names: seven belonged to Petone Pa, two to Waiwhetu Pa, and one each to Ngauranga, Kaiwharawhara, Pipitea, Tiaiwai and Kumutoto Pa. There was no signatory from Te Aro. The deed identified the signatories as "the sole and only proprietors, or owners" of Port Nicholson. They were said to have sold their "lands, tenements, woods, bays, harbours, rivers, streams and creeks" to Colonel William Wakefield for the New Zealand Company. Payment included 120 muskets and accompanying munitions, various utensils, and numerous items of clothing. See Te Whanganui a Tara me ona Takiwa: Report on the Wellington District, Waitangi Tribunal, 2003, chapter 3, pg 57.) Among the recipients was Ngāti Tama chief Te Kaeaea (also known as Taringa Kuri, or "Dog's Ear"), then living at Kaiwharawhara in subservience to Te Rauparaha. (Note: Taringa Kuri later asserted that he believed he had not alienated any Port Nicholson land to the New Zealand Company and had accepted payment only for anchorage rights in the harbour. See Te Whanganui a Tara me ona Takiwa: Report on the Wellington District, Waitangi Tribunal, 2003, chapter 9, pg 198-199.) Ngāti Rangatahi, although it had been in the Heretaunga district seasonally since the early 1830s, was offered nothing, although its territory was included in the purchase. Te Rauparaha, who also saw himself as the owner by right of conquest, objected strongly to the purchases.

New Zealand Company settlers began arriving at Port Nicholson from January 1840 in numbers that shocked Māori, who soon found Pākehā trampling over their homes, gardens and cemeteries, and in places sticking survey pegs in the ground. Taringa Kuri and his Ngati Tama people moved to the Hutt Valley because of incursions on their cultivation land at Kaiwharawhara by settlers and their cattle, while in Porirua Te Rauparaha's nephew and fellow Ngāti Toa chief Te Rangihaeata menaced surveyors and settlers who attempted to take possession of land there.

=== Spain commission ===
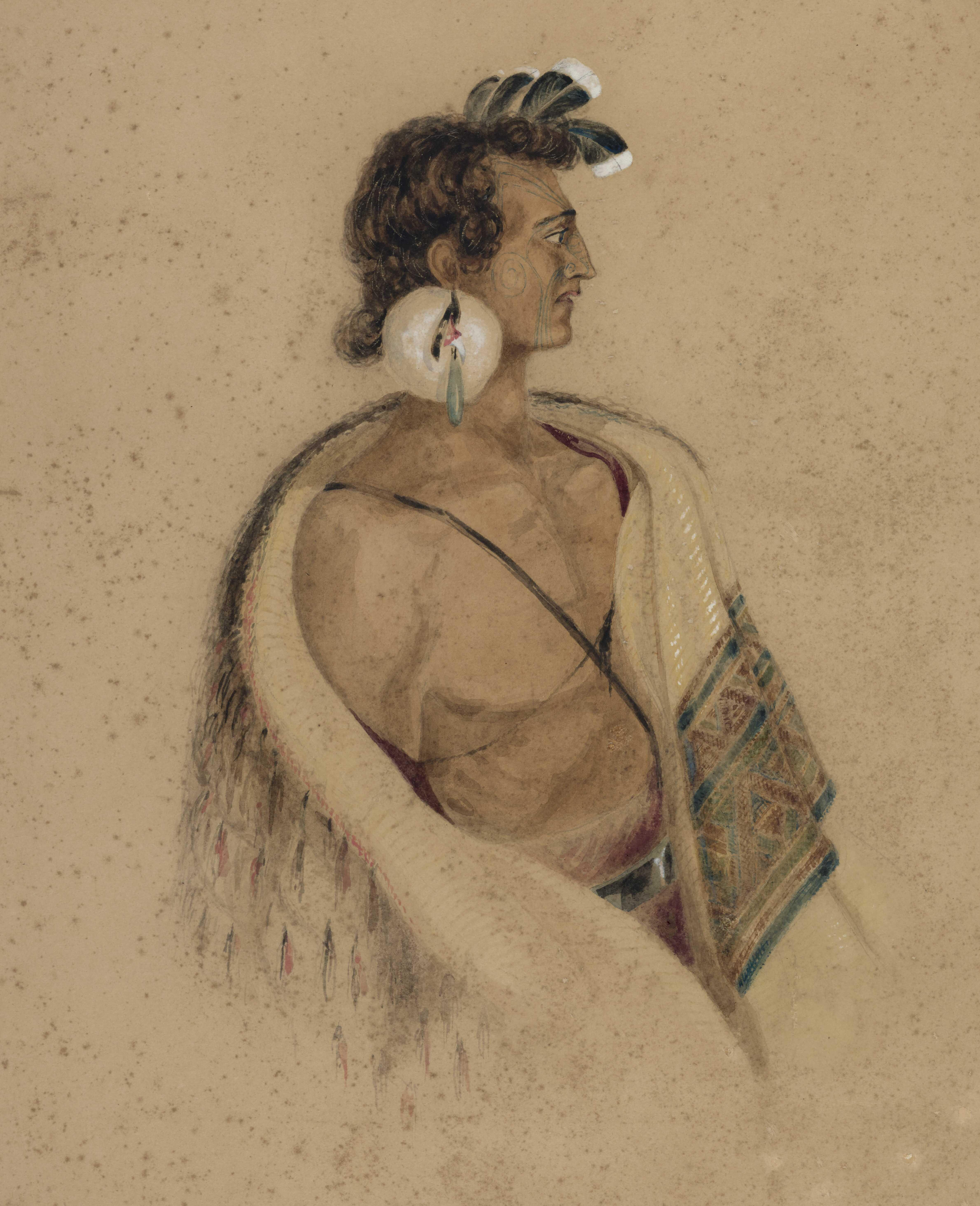
Ngāti Toa Maori chief Te Rangihaeata, 1840. Artist: Charles Heaphy

In January 1841 Secretary of State for War and the Colonies Lord John Russell appointed lawyer William Spain as Land Claims Commissioner to investigate and determine the validity of the New Zealand Company purchases. Spain arrived in Auckland in December and began his hearings into the Port Nicholson dealings in May 1842.

The New Zealand Company frustrated Spain's efforts to make a full investigation of its entitlement to land and in June 1843 it pushed ahead with surveying of the disputed Wairau Plains in the South Island, despite requests by Te Rauparaha and Te Rangihaeata to halt pending Spain's decision on the legality of the purchase. An abortive bid by settlers and company representatives to arrest the two chiefs for impeding them resulted in the bloody Wairau Affray.

In a preliminary report in 1843 Spain stated that many of the Māori taking part in the original Port Nicholson transaction in 1839 would not have understood that by signing the deed they were selling their land, including pā and cultivations. He noted that "the greater portion of the land claimed by the Company in the Port Nicholson district, and also in the district between Port Nicholson and Wanganui, including the latter place, has not been alienated by the natives to the New Zealand Company; and that the other portions of the same districts have been only partially alienated by the natives to that body".

Despite the company's inability to prove it had made a valid purchase of land—and the Treaty of Waitangi's guarantee that Māori would have undisturbed possession of their lands so long as they wished to retain them—Spain in early 1843 ceased public hearings and began serving as an arbitrator or umpire in negotiations between the New Zealand Company and Protector of Aborigines George Clarke Junior on how Māori should be "compensated" for the alienation of their land. Without consulting Māori, the two sides agreed on 29 January 1844 that the New Zealand Company would make a further £1500 payment as compensation "to natives who may be entitled to receive it" for about 67,000 acres, including surveyed sections in the Hutt Valley.

Spain convened a special sitting of the Court of Land Claims at Te Aro pā on 23 February where he informed its occupants of the agreement and asked them to sign deeds of release in exchange for payment. The deeds indicated acceptance of "an absolute surrender of all our title to all our claims in all our lands which are written in the Document" except pā, cultivations, sacred places and reserves. Te Aro Māori demanded further payment, but relented four days later when Ngāti Mutunga chief Pōmare—visiting the area from his new home in the Chatham Islands—advised them to accept the offer. Te Aro gave a third of their £300 payment to Pōmare, who then returned to the Chatham Islands. Another £530 was distributed to Māori of Kumutoto, Pipitea and Tiakiwai pā the same day. (Note: The Waitangi Tribunal concluded the arbitration process placed undue pressure on Māori to sign their deeds of release and that those receiving payment "had no meaningful comprehension of the very notion of the 'sale' of land; it was a totally alien concept to them". See Te Whanganui a Tara me ona Takiwa: Report on the Wellington District, Waitangi Tribunal, 2003, chapter 8, The 1844 Deeds of Release, pp. 176-78.)

Spain, who in early February had gained in-principle agreement from Te Rauparaha about compensating Ngāti Toa for land at Port Nicholson, met the chief again on 8 and 9 March 1844 at Porirua, this time also with Te Rangihaeata. When he attempted to secure their signatures to a deed of release for their interest in land at Port Nicholson, Te Rauparaha claimed he had previously been unaware it would include payment for Heretaunga, which he now refused to relinquish. Te Rauparaha said he considered "Port Nicholson" to mean all the land seaward of the Rotokakahi Stream, about 2 km up the Heretaunga (Hutt) River. Spain raised his cash offer, offering Te Rauparaha another £100 to compensate for lost crops if he ensured Taringa Kuri left the valley immediately.

Taringa Kuri then began cutting a line through bush at Rotokakahi, warning government officials it was the northern boundary of "Port Nicholson" land for which the New Zealand Company had secured its deeds of settlement. On 12 November, Clarke wrote a document acknowledging the receipt by Te Rauparaha and Te Rangihaeata of the £400 for the "surrender" of Heretaunga. The Waitangi Tribunal noted that the document did not define the boundaries of the land that had been surrendered and gave Ngāti Toa no guarantee of reserves. It said the document was not signed by Te Rangihaeata, who received no share of the money until March 1845. The tribunal said there was no indication Ngāti Tama received any of the £100 compensation for their crops, nor was Ngāti Rangatahi offered or given compensation for being ousted from their land.

From November 1844 the government intensified its efforts to oust Ngāti Tama and Ngāti Rangatahi from the Hutt Valley, for the first time gaining support from Te Rauparaha, who agreed they should leave. But the Hutt Valley Māori reacted with a display of defiance to both Te Rauparaha and the government, expanding their bush clearings and cultivations and protesting that they had never been compensated for their loss of land. Government officials now began to suggest that force might be required to remove them to make way for European settlers.

== Tensions escalate ==
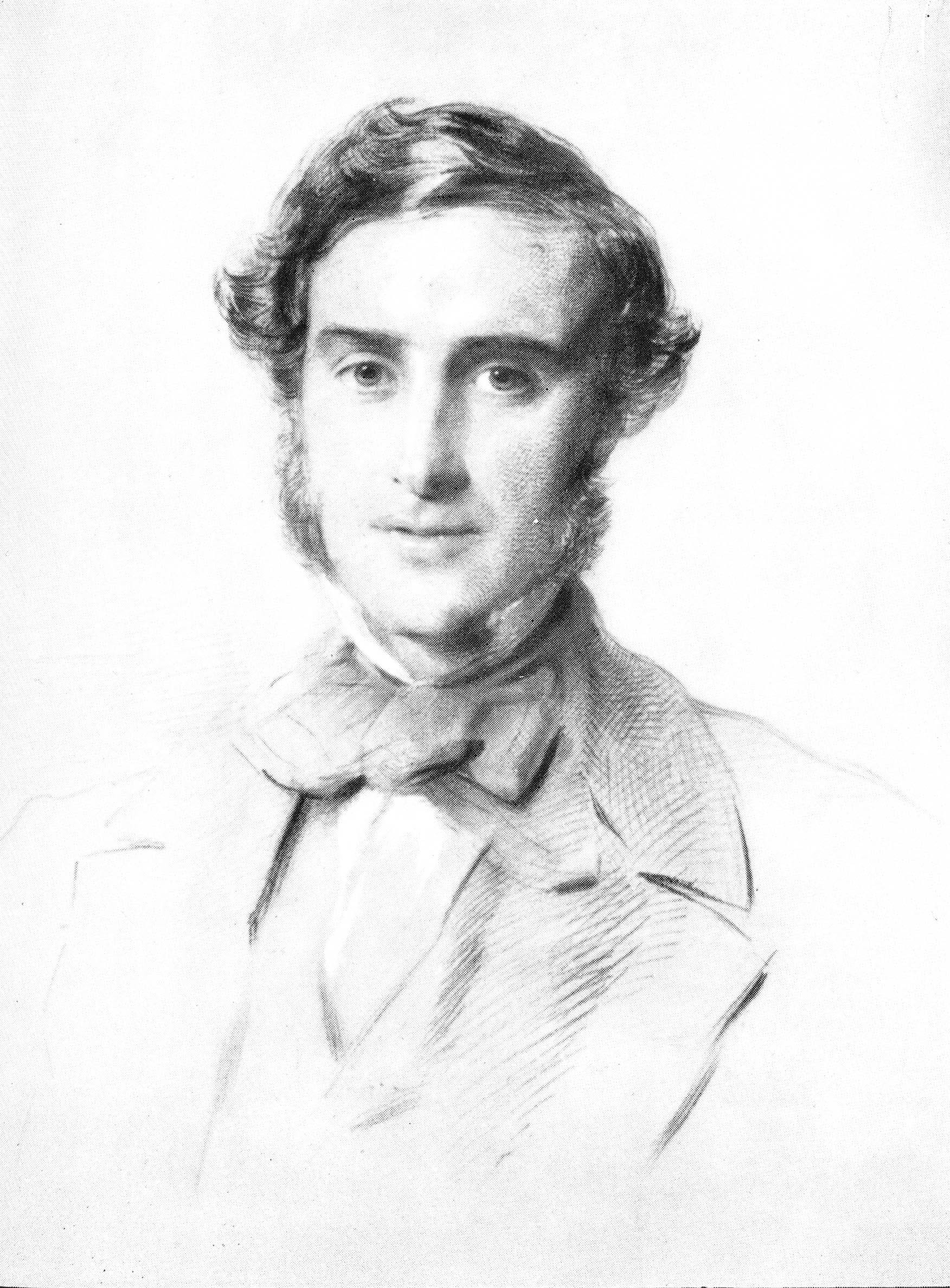
George Grey, 1854. Artist: George Richmond

Fearing a new outbreak of violence and conscious of the parallels between Hutt Valley land tensions and those that had resulted in bloodshed at Wairau two years earlier—in both cases Te Rauparaha and Te Rangihaeata were the chief Māori protagonists in a struggle over dubious land sales to settlers—a militia force was formed in Wellington in 1845, with about 220 men mustering daily for military drill series of stockades. A series of redoubts and stockades were built in the Wellington area, including "Fort Richmond" beside the Hutt River, (Note: Fort Richmond was a 30m by 30m stockaded fort built with donated timber and volunteer labour on the east bank of the Hutt River, just north of present day Ewen Bridge, Lower Hutt.) with further small outposts at Boulcott's Farm and Taita. All were manned by militia until the steady arrival of almost 800 British troops from Auckland and the Bay of Islands, under command of Lieutenant Colonel William Hulme, 96th Regiment, in February 1846.

Governor George Grey arrived in New Zealand in November 1845 and began to adopt a more aggressive approach than his predecessor, Robert Fitzroy, to resolve the land issues. In mid-February 1846 he visited the Hutt Valley and secured a commitment from Taringa Kuri that Ngāti Tama would quit the area within a week, abandoning the 120 hectares of potatoes they had been growing. Grey refused to compensate them for crops and houses, claiming their occupation had been illegal. When settlers began moving on to the vacated land and met resistance from some remaining Māori, Grey sent a 340-strong military force into the valley on 24 February. He then sent a message to Ngāti Rangatahi chief Kaparatehau, demanding that he abandon the village of Maraenuku, beside the Hutt River, and threatened an immediate attack if they had not left by noon the next day, 25 February. Kaparatehau agreed. Houses in the village were ransacked by Europeans the night they left and on 27 February British troops marched into the village and burned what remained, desecrating the village chapel and burial place in the process. Aggrieved Ngāti Rangatahi retaliated on 1 and 3 March by raiding nearby settlers’ farms, destroying furniture, smashing windows, killing pigs and threatening the settlers with death if they raised an alarm.

Ignoring Crown law advice that his expulsion of Ngāti Rangatahi had been illegal because FitzRoy's deeds of settlements had excluded native cultivations and homes—and that Māori had been justified in resorting to arms to resist eviction—Grey declared martial law on 3 March in the Wellington District, south of Paekākāriki. The same morning a party of Māori fired several volleys the 96th's grenadier company, under command of Captain Eyton, near Boulcott's Farm, 3 km north of Fort Richmond but was repulsed when the troops returned fire. Grey ordered HMS Driver to take reinforcements to Petone—50 of the 58th, 20 of the 96th and 30 of the 99th, under command of Lieutenant Edward Barclay, 96th. In late March two Māori were arrested and put on trial for taking part in the plundering of settlers' homes at the beginning of the month; days later, on 2 April, farmer Andrew Gillespie and his son were fatally attacked by tomahawk on vacated land on which Gillespie's family had newly settled. Te Rauparaha sent word to Grey that the killers were Whanganui Māori unconnected with Ngāti Toa and could be found at Porirua. The suspects fled into bushland when a police party was sent from Wellington to capture them.

Troops discovered a newly built stockaded and entrenched stronghold at the head of the Pauatahanui inlet in Porirua Harbour occupied by Te Rangihaeata and Grey responded by dispatching 250 troops to establish a garrison at present-day Plimmerton and starting work on a military road from Wellington to Porirua.

== Boulcott's Farm ==
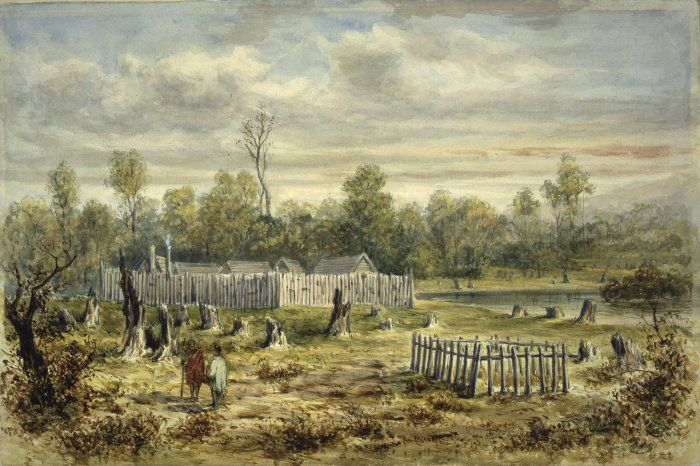
Boulcott's Stockade and military graves, Hutt Valley, 1846. Artist: Lt George Hyde Page, 58th Regiment

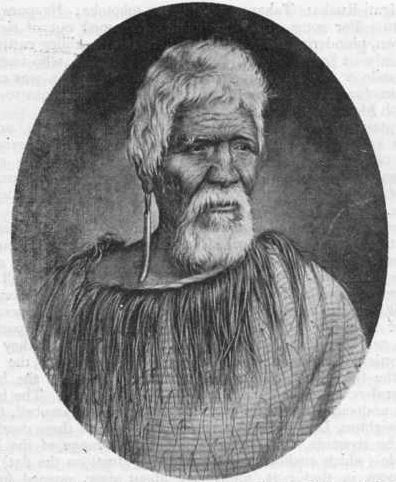
Ngati Haua-te-Rangi chief Hemi Topine Te Mamaku. Artist: Gottfried Lindauer

Ignoring warnings from Te Rauparaha and Te Āti Awa chief Te Puni that an armed strike was imminent, Port Nicholson police magistrate Major M. Richmond disbanded the militia in Wellington and reduced the strength of his Hutt Valley forces. But at daybreak on 16 May 1846 a force of 200 Ngāti Toa and Ngāti-Hāua-te-Rangi warriors, led by Upper Whanganui chief Topine Te Mamaku, launched an attack on the imperial outpost at Boulcott's Farm.

The battle took place on the morning of May 16, 1846. About half an hour before daylight that morning, the Sentry in front of where the inlying pickett's tent, observed several Māoris creeping towards them. Screening themselves with bushes and branches of scrub. Who reported to have had at least 50 guns. The sentry screamed "Maoris" then he fired, but was overpowered. Two volleys were fired at the four-man English picket, or advance position. Te Mamaku's fighters rushed the tents with tomahawks. William Allen, ran from his tent and raised his bugle to sound the alarm just as one of the attackers felled him with a tomahawk, almost severing his right arm. He snatched up the bugle with his left hand and again started to sound the alarm as a second blow killed him. They then turned their attention on the remaining 45 men in the Boulcott's garrison. Half the force of soldiers at Boulcott's Farm were quartered in a large barn, around which a stockade of slabs and small logs had been erected and loopholed for musket-fire. The rest of the troops were accommodated in small slab outhouses near the barn.

Lieutenant Page's house was surrounded by Māori after a few moments after the destruction of the picket. Page, who had snatched up his sword and loaded his gun, rushed out with two men, fought their way from the house in which they were besieged to a barn, where half the force were quartered. Page ordered his men to advance in the open with fixed bayonets and were reinforced by a party of seven members of the Hutt militia, on hearing the firing, advanced to Boulcott's and took part in the fight and joined against Te Mamaku's forces about 90 minutes after the attack began. The firefight lasted about an hour and a half. Six soldiers were killed and four were wounded in the battle. Private Patrick Haslamn assisted in putting them in their blankets, and laying their bodies in their last resting-place at the farm. One soldier died of wounds who was buried with military honours along with a settler, who also died some days later. There is no reliable account of Māori casualties. But Māori losses were thought to be two dead and 10 or more wounded. The defenders managed to take prisoners. On 16 November 1846 five Māori prisoners arrived at Hobart for armed resistance against the Crown. Te Umuroa, Te Waretiti, Te Kumete, Matai-umu and Te Rāhui were sentenced to a penal colony following their involvement. Two years later they were pardoned and returned to New Zealand but one of them, Te Umuroa, had died of tuberculosis.

A month after the battle, Māori who had fought at Boulcott's Farm taunted the colonial forces by playing Allen's bugle, which they had taken as a trophy. Allen's bugle was later recovered in one of Te Rangihaeata's deserted camps at Battle Hill. The conflict highlighted rising tensions regarding land purchases, particularly transactions negotiated by the New Zealand Company.

The scare prompted military authorities to arm 250 kūpapa, or "friendly", Te Āti Awa Māori who served under chief Te Puni to protect settlers, while Te Aro settlers formed a volunteer force that began nightly patrols of the settlement, guarding against an expected hostile Māori attack.

A second settler, Richard Rush, was killed in a tomahawk attack on 15 June and the following day a 74-strong composite force of Regular troops, Hutt Militia and Te Āti Awa Māori marched north from Boulcott's Farm and became involved in a skirmish with hostile Māori near Taita, resulting in several of the imperial forces being wounded.

A memorial stone at the corner of High Street and Military Road in Lower Hutt lists the names of eight soldiers from the British 58th and 99th Regiments who were killed in action or died of wounds following the attack at Boulcott's Farm. There is a stone in the cemetery at St James's Church, Lower Hutt.

== Capture of Te Rauparaha ==
Warned that a large war party of Upper Whanganui Māori led by warrior chiefs Ngapara and Maketu was on the march down the west coast to reinforce Te Rangihaeata and Te Mamaku, Grey on 18 June extended martial law northwards to Whanganui. The reinforcements were reported to have been summoned by Te Rauparaha in a letter that had been sighted by a Whanganui settler.

Grey gained the agreement of Te Āti Awa chief Wiremu Kīngi Te Rangitāke, based near Waikanae, that he would block and attack the Upper Whanganui taua's advance if it passed along the coast through his territory. The Governor then launched a dawn raid on Te Rauparaha's village of Taupo, near present-day Plimmerton, on 23 July, arresting the chief on the basis that he had committed treason by supplying arms, ammunition and provisions to Te Rangihaeata, who was in rebellion against the government. Several other chiefs were seized and homes in surrounding villages searched for weapons and ammunition. When news of the arrests reached Te Rangihaeata, a rescue attempt by 50 warriors was mounted but easily driven off. Grey's prisoners were transferred to HMS Calliope, which sailed to Auckland, and they were detained without charge as prisoners of war for ten months. Te Rauparaha remained under detention in Auckland until 1848.

== Battle Hill ==
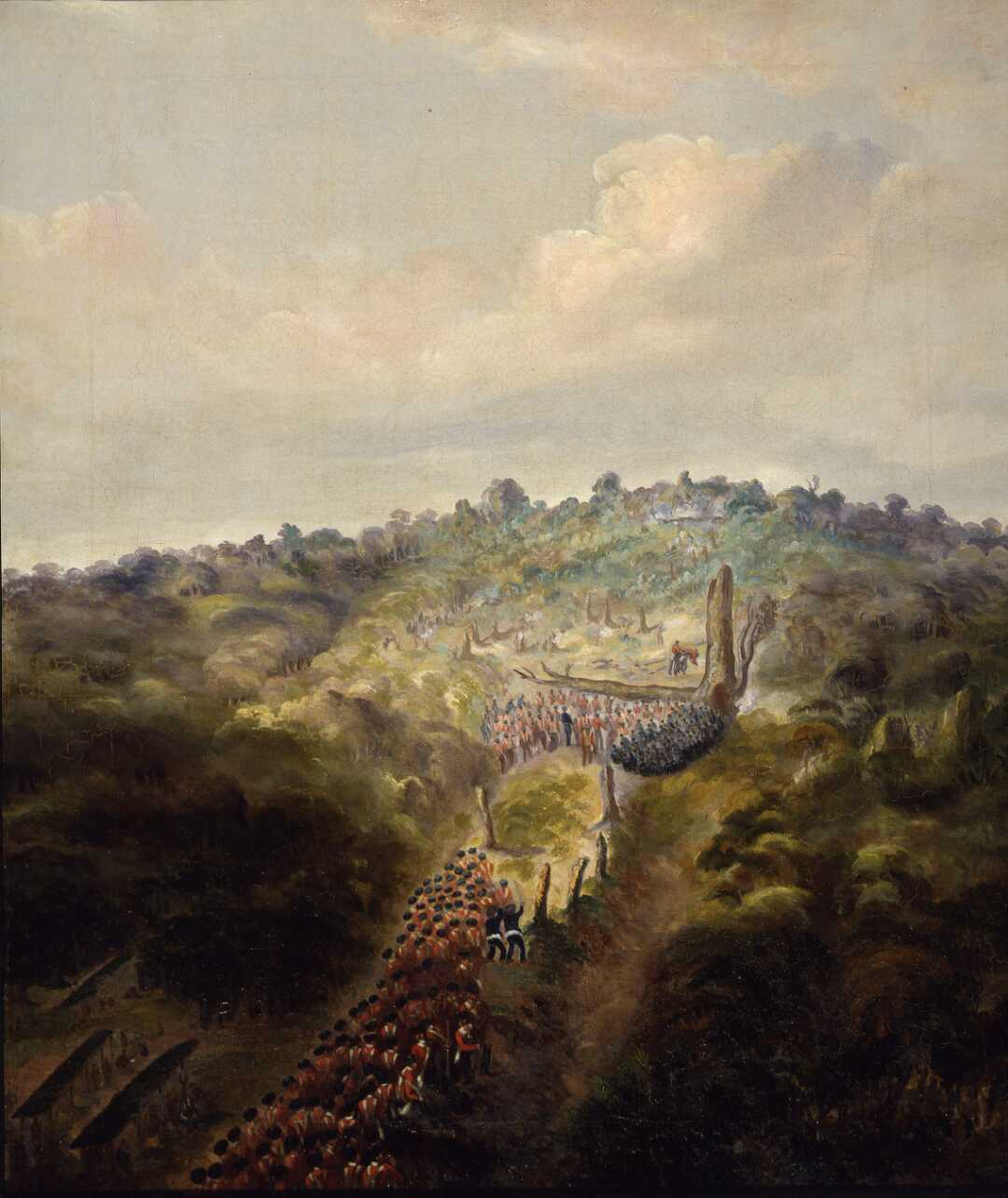
The fight at Battle Hill, Horokiwi, 6 August 1846. Artist: George Hyde Page

On 31 July 1846 a 213-strong combined force of Hutt militia, armed police and 150 Te Āti Awa set off overland to launch a surprise rear attack on Te Rangihaeta's stronghold at Pauatahanui. But the occupants of the pā were alerted as the forces approached early the next day and were able to flee. The Pauatahanui pā was commandeered as an imperial military post to help guard construction work on the main road northwards.

Two days later, on 3 August, Major Edward Last began to lead the government force north through the heavily forested Horokiri ranges in pursuit of Te Rangihaeata and Te Mamaku. The force comprised Regulars, seaman from the Calliope, militia, armed police and several hundred Māori allies from Te Āti Awa and Ngāti Toa, supported by a detachment of Pioneers armed with axes and other cutting tools to cut through the bush.

Te Rangihaeata's stronghold was discovered on 6 August at the crest of a steep ridge, surrounded by strong fortifications and three of the British force were killed in an exchange of fire that lasted several hours until nightfall. The force withdrew from the hill and a detachment of seamen were sent back to Pauatahanui to bring up two mortars. The weapons were carried in on 7 August and about 80 shells were fired throughout 8 August from a range of about 1200 metres. Some of the force also skirmished with Te Rangihaeata's warriors in the bush near the pā.

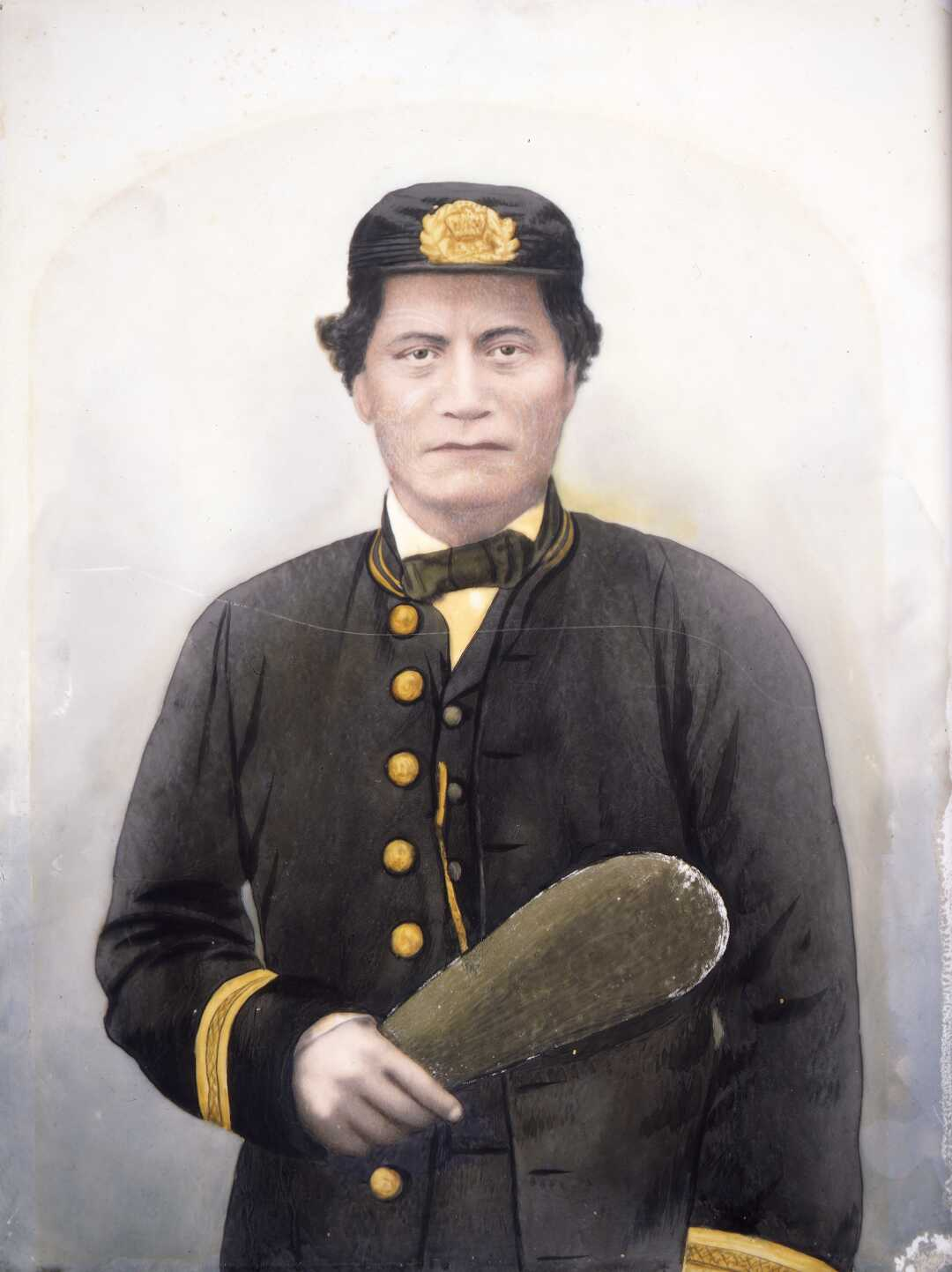
Ngāti Toa chief Rawiri Puaha, who led the pursuit of Te Rangihaeata and Te Mamaku from 17 August 1846.

By 10 August, Last had concluded a decisive victory was unattainable and the majority of the force was withdrawn, leaving a Māori attack force to maintain fire. Three days later they discovered Te Rangihaeata and his entire force had evacuated under cover of darkness and rain. Delayed by storms, the kūpapa Māori, including a Ngāti Toa detachment led by Rawiri Puaha, began a pursuit on 17 August through heavy bush across steep ridges, deep valleys and rocky streams, with both sides suffering casualties in sporadic exchanges of gunfire. Te Rangihaeata finally entrenched himself with about 100 men at a pā named Poroutawhao in swampland between Horowhenua and the Manawatu, while Te Mamaku returned with his force to his Whanganui River base.

The site of the 6–10 August battle has been preserved as a recreational area named Battle Hill Farm Forest Park.

== Waitangi Tribunal ==
The Waitangi Tribunal issued a report in 2003 on 13 claims relating to the area covered by the New Zealand Company's 1839 Port Nicholson deed of purchase, as extended in 1844 to the southwest coast. It identified Māori groups with ahi ka rights in the Port Nicholson block in 1840, which included Ngāti Toa in the Heretaunga and concluded that the Crown had failed to adequately compensate Ngāti Toa, Ngāti Rangatahi and Ngāti Tama for their loss of lands and cultivations.

The tribunal found that the 1839 Port Nicholson deed of purchase was invalid and conferred no rights to either the New Zealand Company or those to whom it on-sold its land. It found that the Crown had failed to protect the treaty rights of Māori to sell their land at a fair price and it was critical of the decision to switch from proceeding with Spain's inquiry to implementing a form of arbitration without the informed consent of Māori.
