= John Alexander Gilfillan =

British painter (1793–1864)

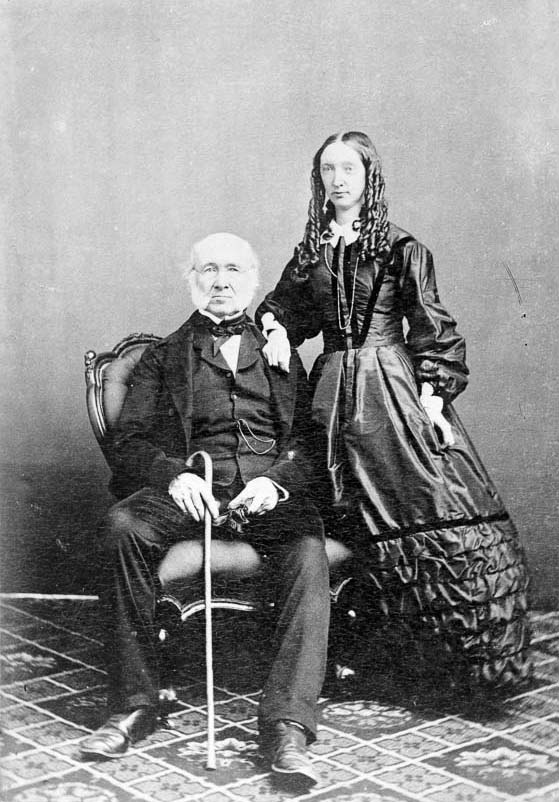
- John Alexander Gilfillan and woman [Miss Mary Jane Gilfillan], Melbourne, c. 1856
- Born: John Alexander Gilfillan; 1793; Jersey
- Died: 11 February 1864 (aged 70–71); Melbourne
- Resting place: Melbourne General Cemetery
- Education: Painter
- Known for: Painting, New Zealand Settler, Scottish Professor

John Alexander Gilfillan was a professor of painting at the University of Strathclyde who migrated to Whanganui, New Zealand in 1841. He settled on a farm in Whanganui but when this was destroyed in 1847 he moved to Australia. While there he worked as a Customs Agent and painted a number of significant historical paintings.

== Life ==
John Alexander Gilfillan was born in 1793 in Jersey, an island located near the coast of Normandy, France. John spent eight years in the Royal Navy before deciding to take up art as a profession. He was later trained as an artist in Scotland and was Professor of Painting at the University of Strathclyde (then known as the Andersonian University) Glasgow.

In 1841 he migrated to New Zealand arriving in Wellington on Christmas Day. Gilfillan secured an allotment of 110 acres (45 ha) in the Matarawa Valley near Whanganui, moving onto it in late 1845. Pākehā settlement on traditional Māori land created unrest in the area and on 18 April 1847, Gilfillan's farm was attacked. John escaped and headed for Whanganui believing he was the real target and that his family would not be harmed. He was wrong. When he returned the next day with an armed party he found his wife Mary and three of their children dead. Their homestead was destroyed and another daughter was badly wounded in the attack.

He left New Zealand soon after, arriving in Sydney in 1847. Gilfillan used his sketches from his time in Whanganui to complete the painting of the interior of Putiki Pah, ‘Maori Koreoro or Native Council’, which was hung in the New Zealand Court at the Great Exhibition in London in 1851. In 1852-1853 Gilfillan visited the Victorian gold-diggings and produced a number of sketches which then appeared in the Illustrated London News of 26 February along with excerpts from his journal.

By December 1856, he was working in the Customs Department in Melbourne. And his work ‘Maori Koreoro or Native Council’ had gained considerable attention and was sold to R. Grice for £160. Gilfillan had also started on another ambitious historical painting. This time his subject was ‘The Landing of Captain Cook at Botany Bay’ and according to ‘The Age’ Gilfillan had gone to a lot of trouble to obtain authentic portraits of all the principal actors. By June 1857 the work was nearing completion and the following description appeared in the ‘Adelaide Times’;

The great navigator is, of course, the principal figure in the composition, while grouped around him are Mr Banks, Dr Solander, and several officers Captain Cook has just made the usual proclamation, and has lifted his hat above his head. A seaman is elevating the white ensign of St. George above the group of officers; another has unfurled the Union Jack on the top of a cliff; the marines are firing a salute, while the motley-looking ships' band behind them, and on the right of the picture, are playing the National Anthem.

In November 1856, Gilfillan, along with nine others, drew up the code of rules for the newly formed Victorian Society of Fine Arts and was elected to its committee for the following year. He retired in 1861. He died on 11 February 1864 in Glasgow Street, East Collingwood, Melbourne, and was buried in Melbourne General Cemetery.

== Exhibited work ==
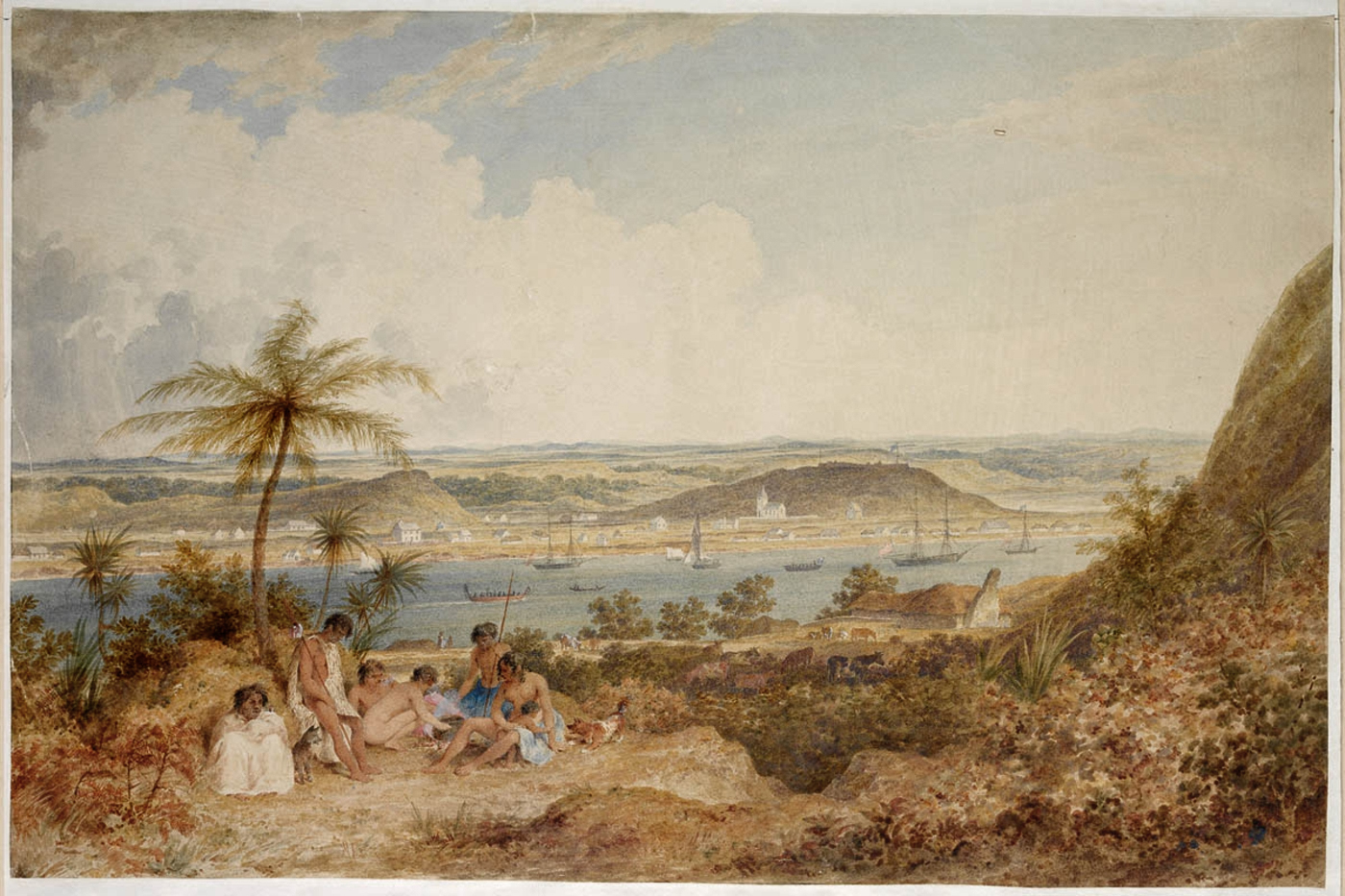
View of Whanganui, New Zealand, 1847, John Alexander Gilifillan, watercolour.

- Adelaide, 1851, oil painting, John Alexander Gilfillan, Philadelphia Centennial Exhibition, 1876.
- Adelaide, 1851, oil painting, John Alexander Gilfillan, Victorian Intercolonial Exhibition, 1875, preparatory to the Philadelphia Exhibition, 1876.
- Alpine Scenery, 1851, oil painting, John Alexander Gilfillan, Annual Exhibition of Fine Arts, Melbourne, 1864.
- Captain Cook taking possession of New South Wales, in the name of His Britannic Majesty, oil painting, John Alexander Gilfillan, Exhibition of the Victorian Society of Fine Arts, 1857.
- Lake Burrawan, New South Wales, oil painting, John Alexander Gilfillan, Annual Exhibition of Fine Arts, Melbourne, 1864.
- Maori Korero, Native Council deliberating on a War Expedition, oil painting, John Alexander Gilfillan, Victorian Fine Arts Society [Inaugural exhibition].
- New Zealand Settlers Bartering with Natives, oil painting, John Alexander Gilfillan, Victorian Fine Arts Society [Inaugural exhibition].
- New Zealander, oil painting, John Alexander Gilfillan, Exhibition of art treasures of Victoria, in aid of the Melbourne Ladies Benevolent Society, 1861.
- Port Macquarie, New South Wales, oil painting, John Alexander Gilfillan, Annual Exhibition of Fine Arts, Melbourne, 1864.
- Scene in New Zealand, oil painting, John Alexander Gilfillan, Agricultural Society of N.S.W. Exhibition, 1870.
- Successful Attack on Spanish Armade, A.D. 1588, oil painting, John Alexander Gilfillan, Annual Exhibition of Fine Arts, Melbourne, 1862.
- Sunset from South Yarra, oil painting, John Alexander Gilfillan, Annual Exhibition of Fine Arts, Melbourne, 1862.
- The Duett, oil painting, John Alexander Gilfillan, Victorian Exhibition of Fine Arts, 1861.

== Works held in collections ==
- View of Whanganui, New Zealand, 1847, JA Gilfillan, watercolour, State Library of New South Wales, DG V7B/1.
- Portrait of a young woman, 1848, JA Gilfillan, watercolour, State Library of New South Wales, ML 347
