= HMS Calliope (1837) =

Frigate of the Royal Navy

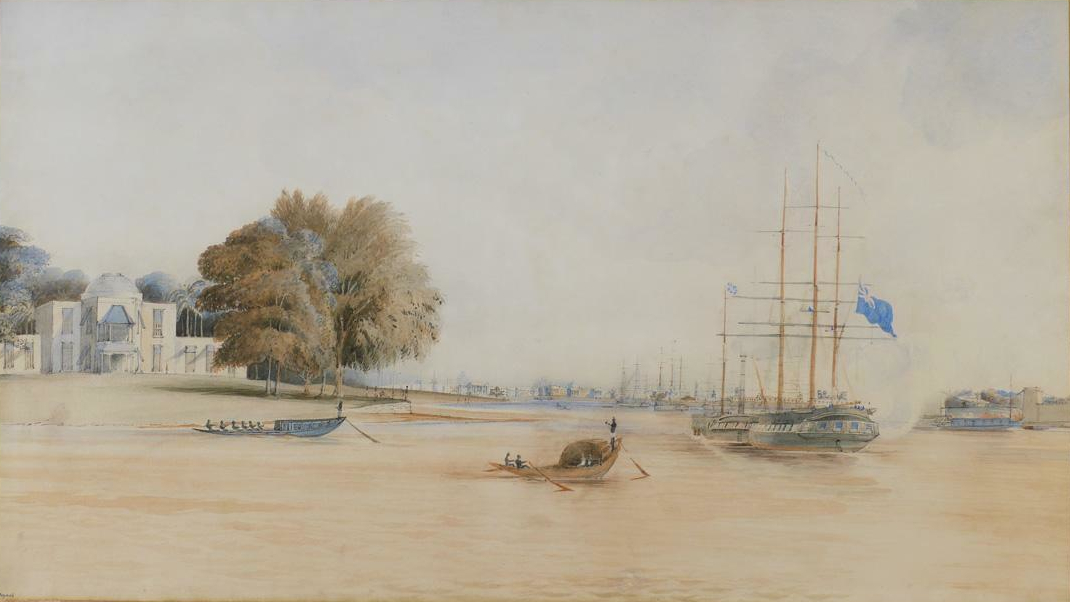
- Calliope at Garden Reach, Calcutta in 1841, by Lieutenant Francis Meynell R.N.

History

United Kingdom
- Name: HMS Calliope
- Ordered: 29 October 1830
- Builder: Sheerness Dockyard
- Cost: £17,882 including fitting
- Laid down: January 1831
- Launched: 5 October 1837
- Commissioned: 10 October 1837
- Fate: Broken up at Plymouth in November 1883

General characteristics
- Class & type: Andromache-class sixth-rate frigate (later "corvette")
- Tons burthen: 720 34/94 bm
- Length: 130 ft 2 in (39.7 m) (gundeck); 109 ft 3 in (33.3 m) (keel)
- Beam: 35 ft 5.5 in (10.8 m)
- Depth of hold: 10 ft 7 in (3.2 m)
- Sail plan: Full-rigged ship
- Complement: 175
- Armament: Upperdeck: 20 × 32-pdr gunnades; Quarterdeck: 6 × 32-pdr gunnades; Foc's'le: 2 × 32-pdr gunnades

HMS Calliope was a 28-gun sixth rate launched in October 1837 and broken up in November 1883.

== Career ==
EIC ship Nemesis, with boats from the Sulphur, Calliope, Larne and Starling, destroying Chinese war junks in Anson's Bay, on 7 January 1841.

During the period 1841-42 she served at Canton with Sir William Parker's ships in the First Anglo-Chinese War (1839–42), known popularly as the First Opium War.

Calliope under Captain Edward Stanley, left Plymouth, England on 18 August 1845, sailing for Hobart, Australia, via Madeira and the Cape of Good Hope. Upon arrival at Hobart the ship was sent to New Zealand, where she was stationed for 2 1/2 years. The ship's Royal Marines saw action in the Flagstaff War in the north of New Zealand. A Royal Marine was killed at the siege of Ruapekapeka Pā and two seamen were killed in the Hutt Valley campaign. From late February 1846 until October 1847 Calliope operated mainly between Wellington, Whanganui and Nelson. The ship continues to be memorialised through the name of the Calliope Dock that was constructed in 1888 at Calliope Point, Devonport, New Zealand.

Sir James Everard Home was appointed captain of Calliope on 28 November 1850 and died in Sydney on 2 November 1853. A memorial to him was placed in St James' Church. Captain Gennys of HMS Fantome took command as acting captain. Captain Fitzgerald was appointed to take over command.

The ship was converted to a floating chapel in 1855 and was broken up in 1883.

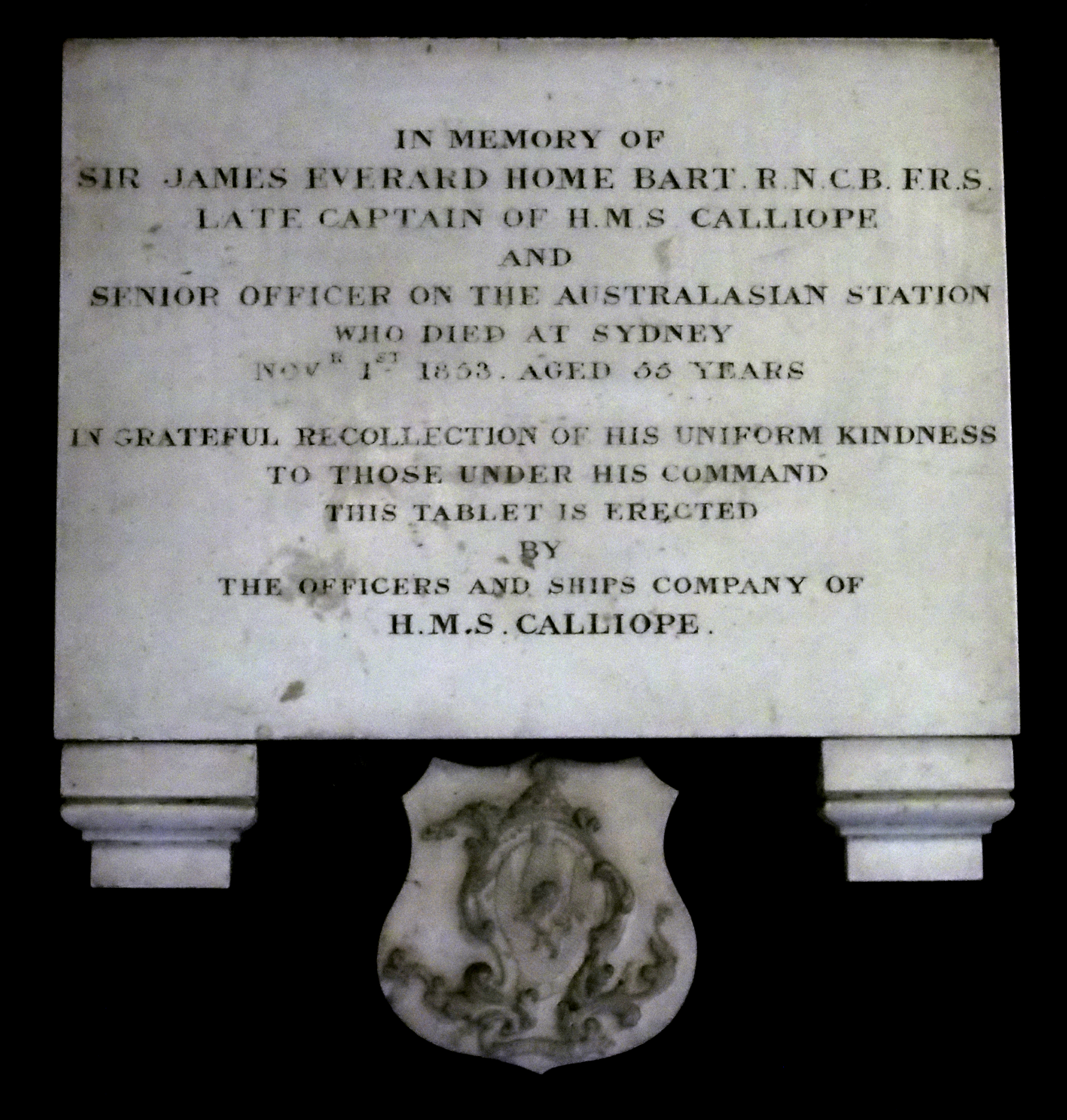
Memorial in St James' Church, Sydney to Sir James Everard Home, one of Calliope's captains

== See also ==
- Henry Thomas Dundas Le Vesconte, later lost on Franklin's Expedition, served on the Calliope
- Patricio Lynch, Chilean sailor on Calliope
