= Hōri Kīngi Te Ānaua =

New Zealand Māori leader (died 1868)

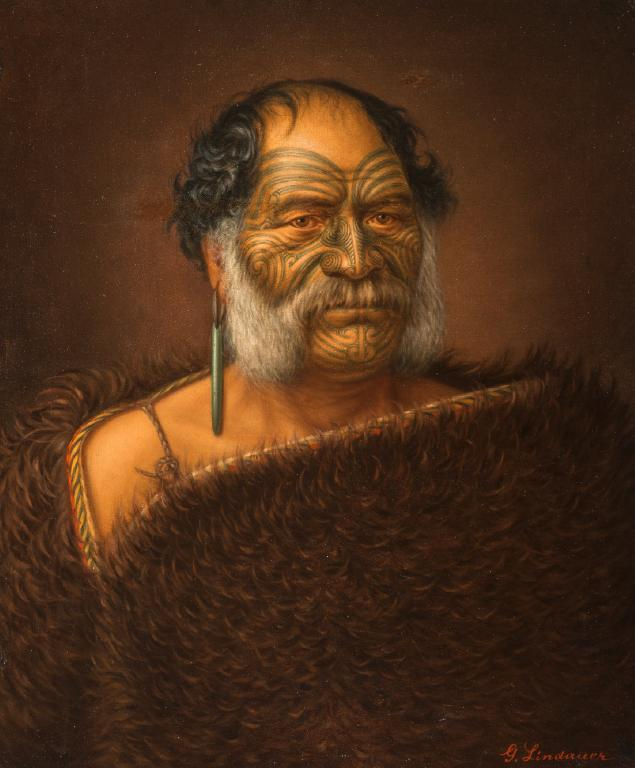
Portrait of Hōri Kīngi Te Ānaua by Gottfried Lindauer

Hōri Kīngi Te Ānaua (died 18 September 1868) was a leader of Ngāti Ruaka, a subtribe of Te Āti Haunui-a-Pāpārangi iwi (Māori tribe) of New Zealand in the early and mid 19th century. He was a leader of the tribes of the Wanganui River district in the tribal wars of the early 19th century. Rere-ō-maki, mother of military leader Te Keepa Te Rangihiwinui (Major Kemp), was his sister.
