= Te Paepae o Aotea =

Te Paepae o Aotea may refer to:

- Te Paepae o Aotea (school), a school in Hāwera, New Zealand
- Te Paepae o Aotea (Bay of Plenty), a rock formation in the Bay of Plenty, New Zealand
- Te Paepae o Aotea (Volkner Rocks) Marine Reserve, a marine reserve in the Bay of Plenty, New Zealand
