= East Cape War =

New Zealand wars (1865–1866)

- Part of New Zealand Wars
Date	13 April 1865 to 12 October 1866
Location	New Zealand
Result	Government victory

Belligerents
United Kingdom: Colony of New Zealand	Whakatohea Māori; Urewera Māori; Ngai Tama Māori

Commanders and leaders
Willoughby Brassey; Thomas McDonnell; Charles Stapp; James Fraser; Mōkena Kōhere; Ropata Wahawaha; Henare Tomoana; Renata Kawepo	Kereopa Te Rau; Anaru Matete

Units involved
(United Kingdom) Colonial: Taranaki Military Settlers; Patea Rangers; Wanganui Rangers; Wanganui Yeomanry Cavalry; Wanganui Native Contingent; 1st Waikato Militia; Forest Rangers; Hawke's Bay Militia; Māori: Arawa; Ngāti Porou; Ngāti Kahungunu	

The East Cape War, sometimes also called the East Coast War, was a series of conflicts fought in the North Island of New Zealand from April 1865 to October 1866 between colonial and Māori military forces. At least five separate campaigns were fought in the area during a period of relative peace in the long-running 19th century New Zealand Wars.

The east coast hostilities came at the close of the Waikato wars and before the outbreak of Te Kooti's War, both fought nearby, but sprang from causes more closely related to the Second Taranaki War—namely, Māori resentment of punitive government land confiscation coupled with the rise of the so-called Hauhau movement, an extremist part of the Pai Marire religion (also called the Hauhau), which was strongly opposed to the alienation of Māori land and eager to strengthen Māori identity.

Pai Mārire arrived on the east coast from Taranaki about 1865. The subsequent ritual killing of missionary Carl Volkner by Pai Mārire followers at Ōpōtiki on 2 March 1865 sparked settler fears of an outbreak of violence and later that year the New Zealand government launched a lengthy expedition to hunt for Volkner's killers and neutralise the movement's influence. Rising tensions between Pai Mārire followers and conservative Māori led to a number of wars between and within Māori iwi, with kūpapa or "loyal" Māori armed by the government in a bid to exterminate the movement.

Major conflicts within the campaign included the cavalry and artillery attack on Te Tarata pā near Ōpōtiki in October 1865 in which about 35 Māori were killed and the seven-day siege of Waerenga-a-Hika in November 1865. The government, claiming that one of Volkner's killers was being given sanctuary by Māori in the remote Urewera region, confiscated northern parts of the Urewera land in January 1866 in a bid to break down Māori resistance and confiscated additional land in Hawke's Bay a year later after a rout of a Māori party it deemed to pose a threat to the settlement of Napier. In 2013 the Crown paid $23 million in financial redress and expressed "profound regret" over the "unjust attacks" in Hawke's Bay in 1866 and apologised for subsequent land confiscations.

== Background ==
In 1863 the government enacted laws to confiscate the land of Māori deemed to have been "in rebellion" against the government in the land wars. The laws were aimed at punishing Māori for their aggression and also establishing law, order and peace by using areas within the confiscated land to establish settlements for colonisation. From early 1865 the government began confiscating wide areas of Taranaki and Waikato, depriving Māori of their food sources and livelihood. In many parts of the North Island, the resultant resentment and anger found expression in the more radical, nationalistic elements of Pai Mārire, which sought to drive European settlers from the land.

Pai Mārire had begun in Taranaki as a peaceful religion, a combination of Christianity and traditional Māori beliefs, but by 1865 had developed a reputation as a violent and vehemently anti-Pākehā (European) movement. The arrival and rapid spread of Pai Mārire in the East Cape destabilised the region, dividing Māori communities and also causing great alarm among New Zealand settlers despite the fact the area was almost devoid of European settlement. The government responded with several ad hoc measures, including supplying arms to "loyal" factions, organising a force of Arawa tribesmen under European leaders, and a series of small expeditions of volunteer settlers from Hawke's Bay.

=== Killing of Carl Volkner ===
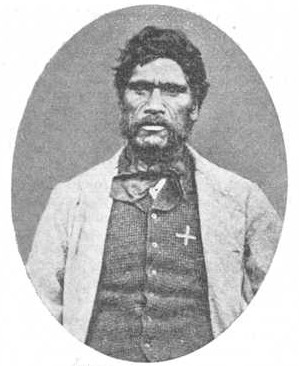
Pai Mārire prophet Patara Raukatauri, who spread the religion in the east coast.

In early 1865 Pai Mārire leader Te Ua Haumēne sent two prophets, Kereopa Te Rau and Patara Raukatauri, to convert East Coast tribes. Kereopa, an ageing veteran of the Waikato wars, carried with him the head of Captain P. W. J. Lloyd, who had been killed in the Ahuahu attack of April 1864 in Taranaki. Kereopa had lost his family in the bloody British raid on Rangiaowhia the previous year and blamed much of the massacre of women and children on missionary complicity, so he and his followers sought utu, or revenge, against missionaries. In Whakatane he demanded that Ngāti Awa iwi hand over the local Roman Catholic priest; without waiting for a result the pair continued on to Ōpōtiki, where they succeeded in winning the allegiance of local Māori from the Whakatohea iwi to the Pai Mārire creeds. German-born Lutheran missionary Carl Sylvius Volkner, who had lived in Ōpōtiki for four years, was absent in Auckland and Patara, believing the cleric was acting as a government spy, wrote him a letter stating that missionaries would henceforth not be permitted to live among Māori and ordered him not to return. Ignoring warnings that his life was in danger, Volkner sailed back to Ōpōtiki, arriving on 1 March. The schooner was looted and Volkner and another missionary, Thomas Grace, were taken captive. The following day Volkner was hanged, then beheaded. In a church service that followed, Kereopa swallowed Volkner's eyes—momentarily choking on one of them—and passed around a chalice containing the missionary's blood for it to be consumed by his congregation. Grace remained captive for two weeks before escaping.

A poorly-armed Māori party led by chiefs including Ropata Wahawaha mounted an unsuccessful raid on Pai Mārire adherents at Mangaone, near Pukemaire, on 10 June 1865. After several more small engagements in the Waiapu Valley a delegation of east coast chiefs led by Mōkena Kōhere appealed to Donald McLean, the new Provincial Superintendent of Hawke's Bay, for arms and reinforcements to subdue the uprising. McLean immediately supplied Mokena with weapons and ammunition, then dispatched about 100 Colonial Defence Force troops under Major James Fraser. HMS Eclipse landed the troops at Hicks Bay and at the mouth of the Waiapu River on 5 July 1865 in a bid to capture Kereopa and Patara, shelling their Hauhau enemy the next day. When a trading cutter following the troops anchored off Whakatane on 22 July to allow surveyor and government interpreter James Fulloon to go ashore to investigate the local mood, it was boarded by Pai Mārire converts at the orders of Taranaki prophet Horomona. Fulloon and two of its crew were shot and killed and the vessel's mast was taken ashore and erected as a niu or sacred pole for Pai Mārire rites.

== East Coast expedition ==
In Auckland, fears grew that the spread of Pai Mārire could unite tribes against settlers in a tide of religious fanaticism. The problem posed a major challenge for the cash-starved government which, already under pressure from London to release British troops for overseas deployment, had deployed the bulk of available forces in Taranaki and Wanganui, where much of their foe was also aligned with Pai Mārire. Without informing the British commander in New Zealand, General Duncan Cameron, Governor George Grey delegated large powers to McLean to use friendly Māori and local volunteers to put down disturbances and punish Volkner's killers.

Fraser's force continued to strike at Pai Mārire villages through July and August with further significant help from Ropata: 25 enemy were killed and about 30 prisoners taken in a raid on Pa-kairomiromi in the Waiapu basin on 2 August, while eight of Fraser's men were wounded. The captured stockade was then burned. When Pai Mārire forces launched an unsuccessful raid on a loyalist Māori pā at Tokomaru Bay under the control of Ngāti Porou chief Henare Potae, Henare requested help from Ropata, who led a reprisal raid on two nearby Pai Mārire positions, Pukepapa and Tautini pā. Though outnumbered 500 to 200, Ropata captured the positions, then used a revolver to execute prisoners from his own tribe who had converted to the religion. On 18 August at a pā between Tokomaru and Tolaga Bay a heavily outnumbered force of 36 men under Henare Potae was reinforced by another 90 under Ropata in a sharp and bloody engagement. Twelve of the Pai Mārire were killed, prompting survivors to abandon the East Cape region and flee south to the Waerengaahika pā in the Tūranganui (Poverty Bay) region.

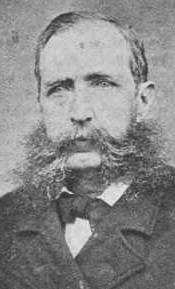
Major Thomas McDonnell

On 2 September 1865 the government declared martial law on the east coast and announced a new expedition against Volkner's killers, threatening confiscation of land in the area if they were not handed over. The expedition was an entirely colonial force, consisting of Taranaki Military Settlers, Wanganui and Patea Rangers, Wanganui Yeomanry Cavalry, and the Wanganui Native Contingent under Major Thomas McDonnell, and all under the overall command of Major Willoughby Brassey. The 500 troops sailed from Wellington and Wanganui and rendezvoused off Hicks Bay on 7 September, joining additional troops who had sailed from Auckland, including former Forest Ranger commander Major Gustavus von Tempsky.

A small initial landing force came under fire as it attempted to land in gale-force winds and was reinforced with the remainder of the troops the next morning, driving the Māori defenders several kilometres inland. Eight Whakatohea Māori were killed in the two-day clash.

The expeditionary force remained in Ōpōtiki for several weeks, converting Volkner's church into a redoubt and engaging in occasional clashes with Māori, who established the entrenched and palisaded Te Puia pā about 8 km inland. On 4 October McDonnell led a force to Te Tarata, a new pā about 6 km from Ōpōtiki. When the force came under heavy fire, McDonnell sent for cavalry and artillery reinforcement, who surrounded the pā on three sides and began shelling it. As Māori reinforcements began arriving from nearby Te Puia, the cavalry charged through them with swords, killing and wounding about 20. McDonnell's forces maintained heavy fire on Te Tarata past nightfall. About 8 pm a member of the Whakatohea garrison called out, asking for terms of surrender. McDonnell told them Volkner's killers would be tried and the rest would be prisoners of war. The garrison requested an hour's truce while they considered the request, but under cover of darkness launched a breakout, rushing the Rangers while firing their shotguns, then engaging in hand-to-hand battle with revolvers and tomahawks. About 35 Māori were killed and 35 wounded, and three of the colonial forces killed. The East Coast Expedition, now under the control of Major Charles Stapp, moved its base to the captured Te Puia and the Whakatohea fell back to new strongholds in the Waioeka Gorge. Soon after about 200 of the Ngati-Rua hapu of Whakatohea surrendered to Stapp; Ngati-Ira, under Hira Te Popo, remained hostile.

In mid-October McDonnell commanded a three-day expedition in which a force of 150 marched into the Waimana Valley in a bid to capture Kereopa and his followers. Early on 20 October the force reached Koingo, a small village on the Waimana River and set up an ambush of a track; Kereopa was targeted but escaped, although five others accompanying him were shot. Troops then raided the village, killing three Urewera and Ngai Tama Māori and capturing several others. The East Coast Expedition's activities continued till November, prompting the surrender of more Māori including a chief, Mokomoko, whose rope had been used in Volkner's hanging; he was later tried and hanged in Auckland. Another 18 were also tried.

In November 1865 the Native Contingent returned to Major-General Trevor Chute's west coast campaign, while the Rangers and 1st Waikato Militia remained in occupation of Ōpōtiki; the Patea Rangers were recalled to the west coast in May 1866.

== Pukemaire ==
In mid-August 1865 an East Coast Field Force, including members of the Waikato Militia, was formed under the command of Major Willoughby Brassey. Supplemented by volunteers recruited in Napier by Captain Charles Westrup, the force sailed on HMS Brisk to Gisborne, where they built a redoubt, before continuing on 30 September to Waiapu, near East Cape, to reinforce Fraser's force.

The two groups—which, with additional support from Ngāti Porou under Ropata totaled 380 men—marched against Pukemaire on 3 October in heavy rain, facing a garrison estimated to be about 400. They opened a flying sap and managed to destroy part of the frail palisade but abandoned attempts to storm the pa when rain rendered their weapons ineffectual. Nine Pai Marire and two government soldiers were reported killed in the engagement. Forces returned to the pa on the night of 8 October ready for a renewed attack but found it deserted. The pa was later burned.

Their quarry established a new stronghold at Hungahunga-toroa, 30 km north of the pa. In October Ropata and Lieutenant Reginald Biggs led a small force, including Forest Rangers, to the new Pai Marire base, scaling nearby cliffs to launch an effective sniping operation, killing 20 occupants and wounding others. About 500 Ngāti Porou occupants of the pa surrendered and were marched to Waiapu where they were ordered to take an oath of allegiance to the Queen and to salute the Union Jack.

== Siege of Waerenga-a-Hika ==
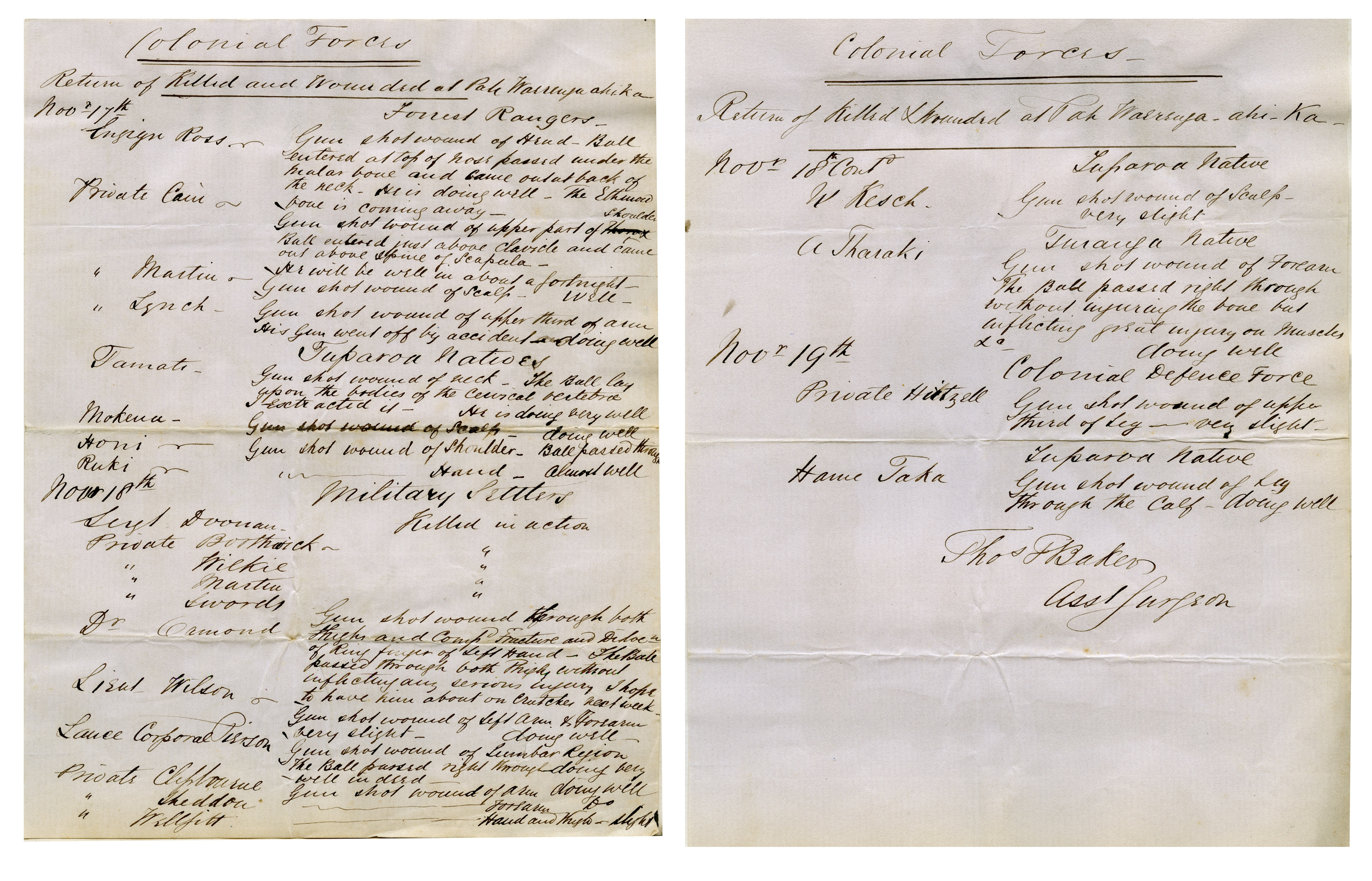
Crown forces killed or wounded at Waerenga-a-Hika

In late October 1865 McLean began planning an expedition against the Waerenga-a-Hika pā—a Pai Mārire community about 11 km from the European settlement at Turanga (modern-day Gisborne)—where several hundred men, as well as women and children, had sought refuge from the east coast wars. Other Pai Mārire converts occupied two fortified villages further inland, Pukeamionga and Kohanga-Karearea. McLean raised 300 volunteers from loyal Ngāti Porou, who were taken by steamer to Poverty Bay, where they were joined by a mixed force of Hawke's Bay Cavalry, Military Settlers and the East Cape expeditionary force under Fraser and Biggs, who were landed from the Brisk. McLean sent an ultimatum to the pā with a list of demands: all Māori were to take an oath of allegiance to the Queen, all who had "fought against the Government" were to be surrendered, everyone who did not belong to the district be expelled, and that all arms were to be surrendered. McLean warned that if the terms were not complied with, they would be attacked and deprived of their homes. Though some signed the oath of allegiance, most ignored the demands and on 16 November, when the ultimatum expired, McLean directed Fraser to begin the attack.

The government force, comprising up to 200 Europeans and 300 Māori, moved on Waerenga-a-Hika on 16 November and took up positions on three sides of the pā, which had a swampy lagoon to the rear, and began a seven-day siege. The site had three lines of defence—an outer two-metre-high stockade, a main fence three metres high and a 1.5-metre-high earth breastwork. While snipers fired at the pā from the roof of a mission station about 300 metres away, the Colonial Defence Force and Military settlers dug in behind a hawthorn hedge that provided cover from two faces of the pā, and the Forest Rangers took up a position near the lagoon. A squad of 30 Military Settlers began a sap towards the north face of the stockade and neared it before coming under attack from Pai Mārire reinforcements from one of the other villages on 18 November. The European force retreated to the main body in a charge with fixed bayonets, but suffered six fatalities as well as another five wounded.

The following day, a Sunday, Pai Mārire fighters were driven off after advancing on the government soldiers in three groups in an action that left between 34 and 60 Māori dead, although there are conflicting accounts of the engagement. According to historian James Cowan, the Pai Mārire warriors held a ceremony at their sacred niu pole before forming three groups and charging the European forces behind the hawthorn hedge, with each warrior holding up their right hand, palm outwards, apparently to ward off enemy bullets. The force reached the hedge, firing as they ran, but were repulsed at almost point-blank range in a barrage that left 60 Māori dead. One European suffered a leg wound. In Fraser's account of the same events, the armed Pai Mārire force advanced from the pā under a white flag of truce, which Fraser viewed as a ruse, "as no flag of truce should be respected carried by such a large body of armed men, and I ordered them to be fired on before they could come up to us ... the enemy were totally defeated, with the loss of 34 killed, and at least that number wounded, their men falling in all directions as they attempted to regain their pa".

On 22 November, after a week of constant rifle fire, Fraser turned to artillery to end the siege, loading shrapnel-filled salmon tins into a six-pounder cannon from the Sturt to create makeshift canister shot. After two rounds were fired into the pā the demoralised garrison hoisted a white flag and 400 occupants surrendered; they were taken to Gisborne to be either released or shipped to the Chatham Islands for imprisonment. The pā was destroyed. Total Pai Mārire losses from the siege were more than 100 dead and 100 wounded, while government losses totaled 11 dead and 20 wounded. A memorial in Makaraka Cemetery in Gisborne records the names of six Hawke's Bay Military Settlers who died on 18 November during the siege.

Among the kūpapa at Waerenga-a-Hika was future Māori guerrilla leader Te Kooti, who was taken prisoner (but later released) on suspicion of treachery after allegations that he was collaborating with the enemy and firing blanks.

== Wairoa expeditions to Waikaremoana ==
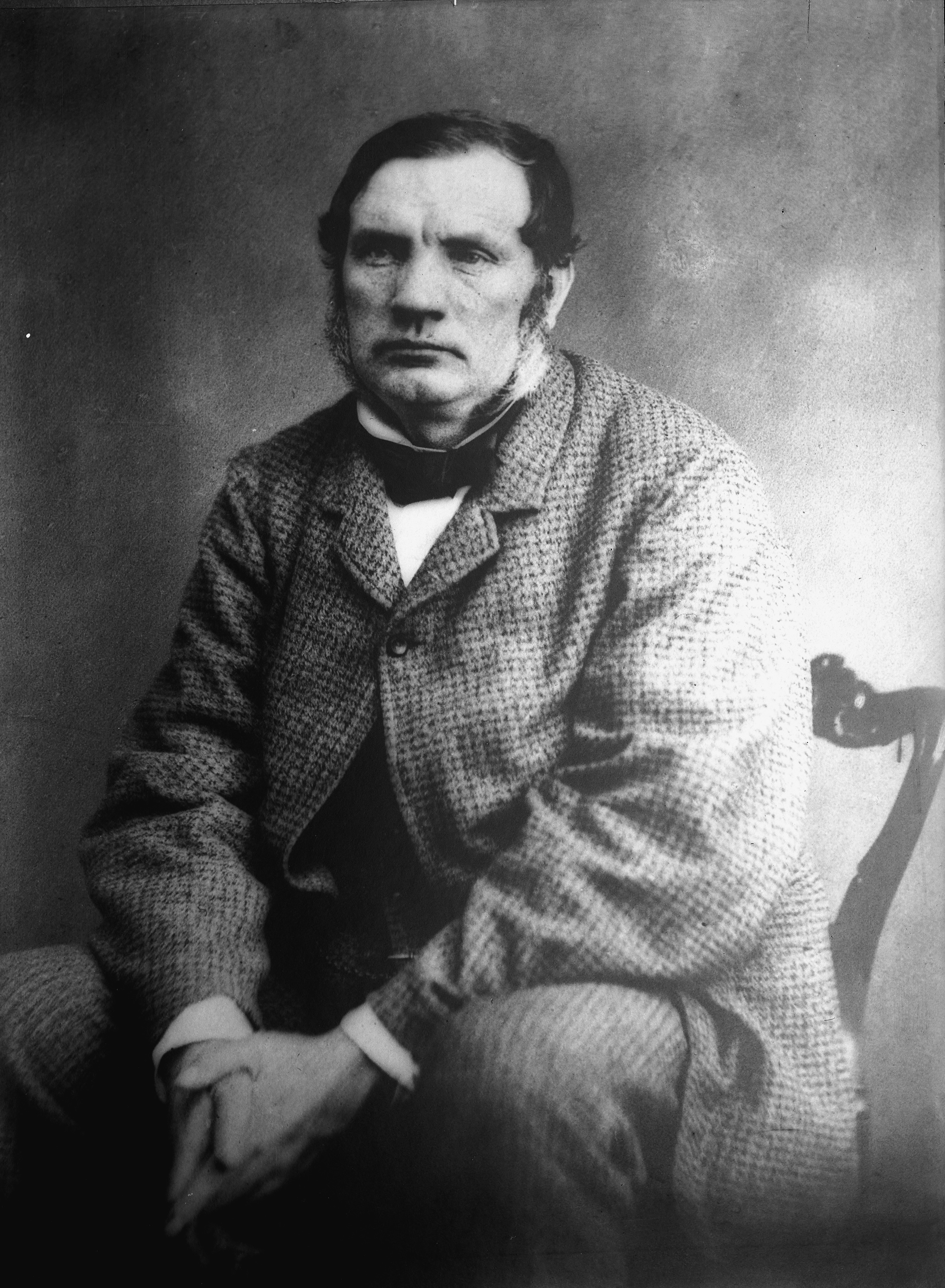
Hawke's Bay Superintendent Donald McLean

Despite a general surrender at the fall of Waerenga-a-Hika on 22 November, Pai Mārire reinforcements from Tūranganui, who had arrived with chiefs Anaru Matete and Te Waru Tamatea during the siege to battle Fraser's forces, were able to escape. A group of about 100 men fled to the upper Wairoa with Anaru, while others went further inland to Waikaremoana in the Urewera mountains. On 25 December Anaru's force was attacked at Omaruhakeke by a pursuing force and then fled to Waikaremoana. On 2 January 1866 the government expedition moved up the Waikaretaheke River, over-running the Tukurangi pā, whose occupants fled across Lake Waikaremoana, taking every canoe with them. The pursuing force reported that it destroyed "no fewer than ten settlements" near Waikaremoana, burning property and taking cattle and horses.

In early January McLean sent a messenger to Waikaremoana chiefs demanding that they abandon "Hauhauism", deliver up their arms and hand themselves in to swear the oath of allegiance if they wished to spare their lives. The messenger was taken prisoner and later killed and decapitated.

On 10 January 1866 a second government expedition, then unaware of the fate of the messenger, set out for Lake Waikaremoana to enforce McLean's demand. The force of 520, under Fraser's command, was mostly kupapa Māori—the majority Ngāti Kahungunu but also a contingent of Ngāti Porou. Two days later they captured a near-empty Pai Mārire pā about 20 km up the Waikaretaheke River, but soon after realised they had been lured into a trap when they were ambushed from hidden rifle pits in the ridges overlooking the track. Fraser's force repulsed the attack, setting fire to dry fern to drive about 150 of the ambush force—a third of them with horses—out of their cover and down to the lake's southern shore at Onepoto, where many fled across the lake on canoe. Fourteen of Fraser's force were killed in the attack and up to 30 wounded, but the allied force killed between 25 and 60 of the Pai Mārire Māori and took 14 prisoners, including five women. Three days later at Onepoto, Ropata seated four of his prisoners in a row—one of them the most senior chief of the upper Wairoa—and executed them with revolver. Binney has claimed Fraser sanctioned the executions, as he had a similar execution at Pukepapa pā near Tokomaru Bay in August 1865.

McLean, meanwhile, continued to hunt for Kereopa. Convinced the Urewera people were giving him sanctuary, McLean declared they were rebelling against the government and on 17 January 1866 the government proclaimed the confiscation of all the low-lying and relatively fertile lands at the northern edges of the Urewera. Binney concluded: "From the government's perspective, the 'sanctuary' of the Urewera had to be broken open. Therefore, its people had to be broken; the most direct way to break them was to take their land."

Confronted with difficult terrain and a general European ignorance of the Urewera region to which most of the survivors fled, the government abandoned plans for a full-scale military invasion and opted to send more kupapa forces into the area on scouting missions, unaccompanied by European officers. On 16 March an exploratory expedition led by Pitiera Kopu set out from Wairoa, reached Onepoto three days later and immediately claimed its first victims. The expedition raided a camp of about 60 people, most of whom escaped. Three of their quarry were killed, with one elderly chief executed by Kopu; McLean viewed that execution as a reprisal for the earlier killing of his envoy to the Waikaremoana chiefs.

In mid-April, a second kupapa expedition was dispatched to the area to capture Anaru, who was said to be returning to Ruatahuna. The force split into several detachments to scour the country; on 24 April they took 30 prisoners and by early May they had taken 260 captives, including women. Some remained prisoners, others were freed after taking the oath of allegiance and 16 were sent to the Chatham Islands, where Pai Mārire captives were being sent in batches throughout 1866. Te Waru and about 15 others surrendered on 9 May and took the oath of allegiance in McLean's presence.

== Omarunui and Petane ==
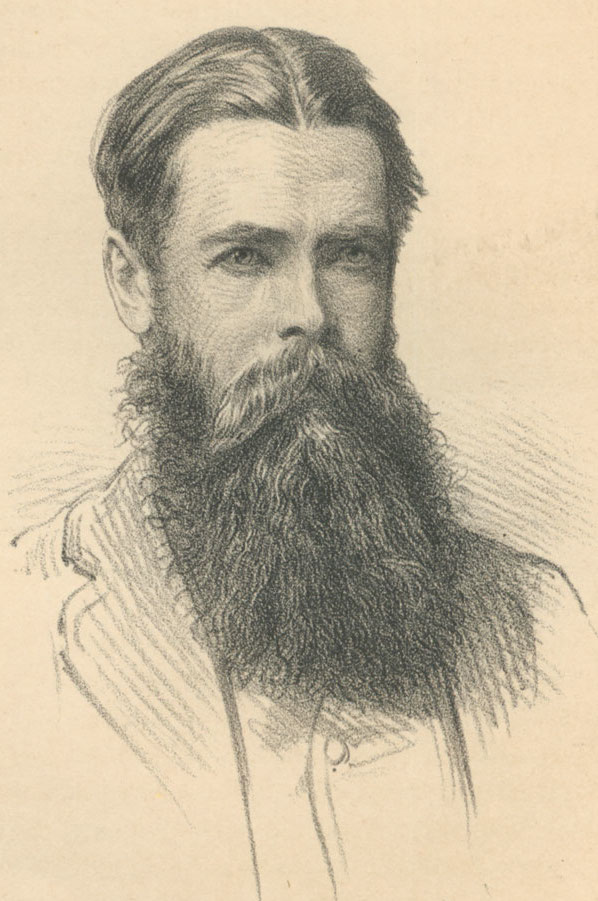
Colonel George Whitmore.

In September 1866 a party of 80 men from the Ngāti Hineuru iwi—whose main villages were at Te Haroto and Tarawera, midway between Napier and Taupō—marched towards Napier, accompanied by another 20 Māori from elsewhere in the North Island. Two months earlier their chiefs had written to McLean, the Crown's chief land purchase agent and the senior Crown official in Hawke's Bay, responding to his invitation to negotiate peace terms and advising that they would lead a party to Napier to meet him. The chiefs also held grievances over previous land sales in the area which they wished to discuss. The party, led by Pai Mārire prophet Panapa and chiefs Nikora, Kipa, Kingita and Petera Kahuroa, as well as Ngāti Tuwharetoa chief Te Rangitahau, stayed for several weeks at Petane, north of Napier. On 4 October most of the party moved to the village of Omarunui, about 10 km southwest of Napier, while the original occupants moved out. McLean, alerted to their arrival at Omarunui, sent a messenger on 5 October demanding that they explain their intentions and over the following three days the chiefs wrote to McLean indicating they wished to take meet him. On 8 October, concluding they were a threat to the Napier settlement, McLean warned the Omarunui encampment that they should return home or they would be attacked.

McLean instructed retired Colonel George Whitmore, a Crimean War veteran and Hawke's Bay settler, to call out 130 Hawke's Bay Militia for active service, drill them for action and join 45 Napier Rifle Volunteers who were also placed on alert. McLean requested further assistance from Fraser, who arrived in Napier on 11 October with 40 Military Settlers and a party of Wairoa kupapa. The entire force was placed under Whitmore's command.

About midnight on 11 October Whitmore and Fraser both marched out of Napier in separate directions: Whitmore with 180 settlers and 200 kupapa headed west, reaching and surrounding the Omarunui settlement before daybreak, while Fraser's detachment of about 40 men went north to Petane to intercept an expected advance on Napier led by Ngāti Hineuru chief Te Rangihiroa.

At Omarunui, Whitmore sent a messenger into the unfortified pā to demand their surrender within an hour; when the deadline passed with no response Whitmore's force launched an attack on the village, with soldiers approaching it across a stream and up a high bank—an advance watched silently and without reaction from the occupants. Whitmore's force opened fire, quickly cutting down the occupants of the pā, whom it outnumbered almost four to one. In a firefight that lasted about an hour, Whitmore's force killed about 31 Ngāti Hineuru, wounded 28 (of whom many later died in hospital) and captured 44 others who attempted to flee, thus accounting for almost all the occupants. Among those killed was Panapa, the prophet. The dead were buried in a mass grave; a Ngāti Hineuru chieftainess was named Ruahuihui ("crowded in a pit") in memory of the event. Most of the prisoners were deported to the Chatham Islands, where they subsequently joined Te Kooti. Whitmore's casualties amounted to two killed and 14 wounded.

Fraser's detachment, meanwhile, intercepted a 25-man mounted party accompanying Te Rangihiroa through a narrow pass at Petane. Heavily outnumbered, the Ngāti Hineuru party was quickly stopped in its tracks: Te Rangihiroa and 11 others were killed, one was wounded and three taken prisoner. The remainder escaped. One of Fraser's men was wounded in the attack. Most of the prisoners in the campaign were transported without trial to the Chatham Islands to be held in harsh conditions for the next two years. In January 1867 the government confiscated the so-called Mohaka-Wakare district under the New Zealand Settlements Act as punishment for the "rebellion" in the Omarunui and Petane areas.

== Crown apology ==
In 2013 the Crown apologised for the injustices involved in Hawke's Bay land dealings, the "unreasonable ultimatum" at Omarunui and the raids, killings and incarcerations that followed. The apology also included the 1867 land confiscations and the subsequent "devastating impact" and long-last poverty that resulted. The Crown agreed to pay $23 million as financial redress.

A separate 2013 Waitangi Tribunal report said the action of Crown forces on the East Coast from 1865 to 1869—the East Coast War and the start of Te Kooti's War—resulted in the deaths of proportionately more Māori than in any other district during the New Zealand wars. It condemned the "illegal imprisonment" of a quarter of the area's adult male population at the Chatham Islands and said the loss in war of an estimated 43 percent of the male population, many through acts of "lawless brutality", was a stain on New Zealand's history and character.

== Commemoration ==
Tuirina Wehi wrote a waiata Waerenga-a-Hika to commemorate the battle at the pā. In 2019 it was arranged for the New Zealand Youth Choir by Robert Wiremu.
