= Völkner incident =

1865 killing of a missionary in colonial New Zealand by the Māori

- Part of the New Zealand Wars and New Zealand land confiscations
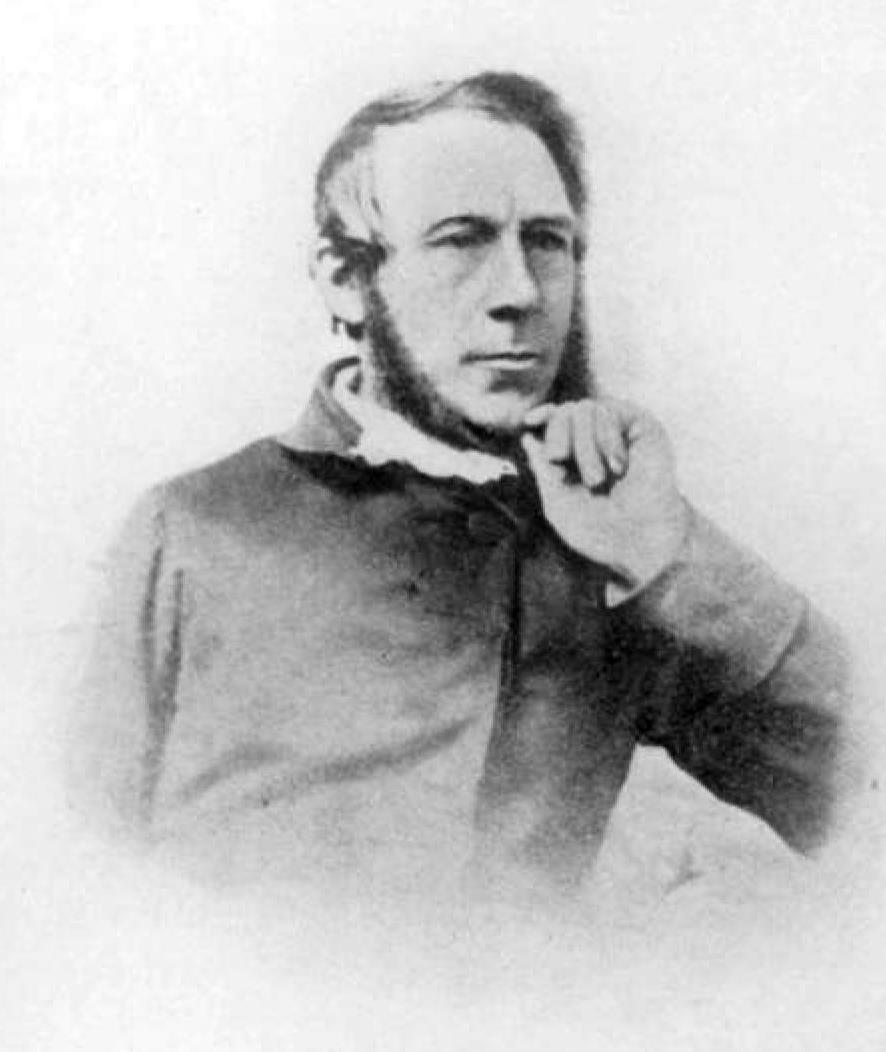
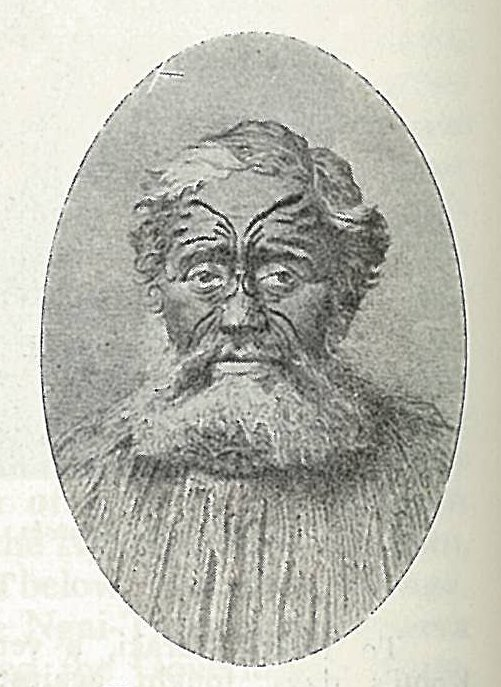
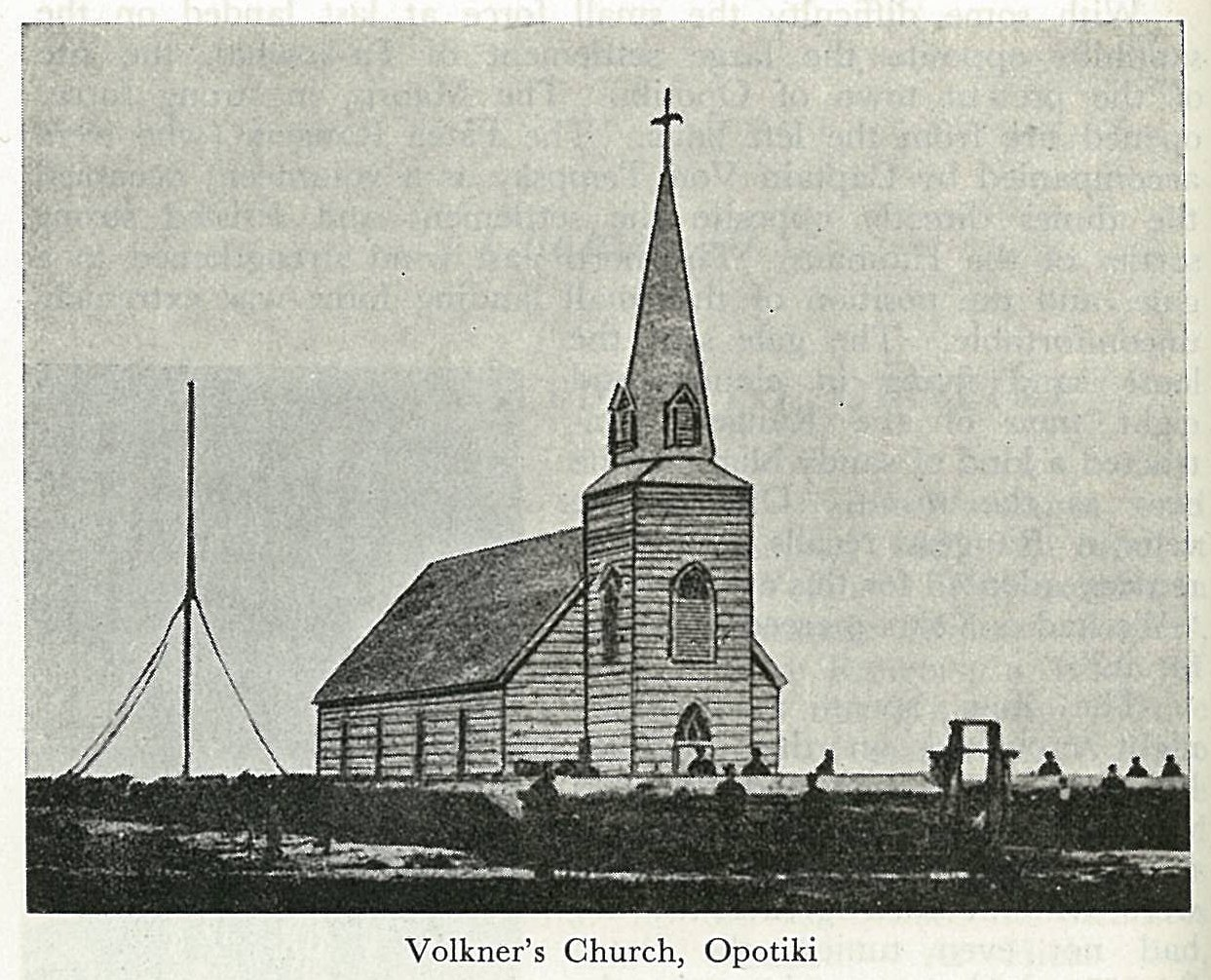
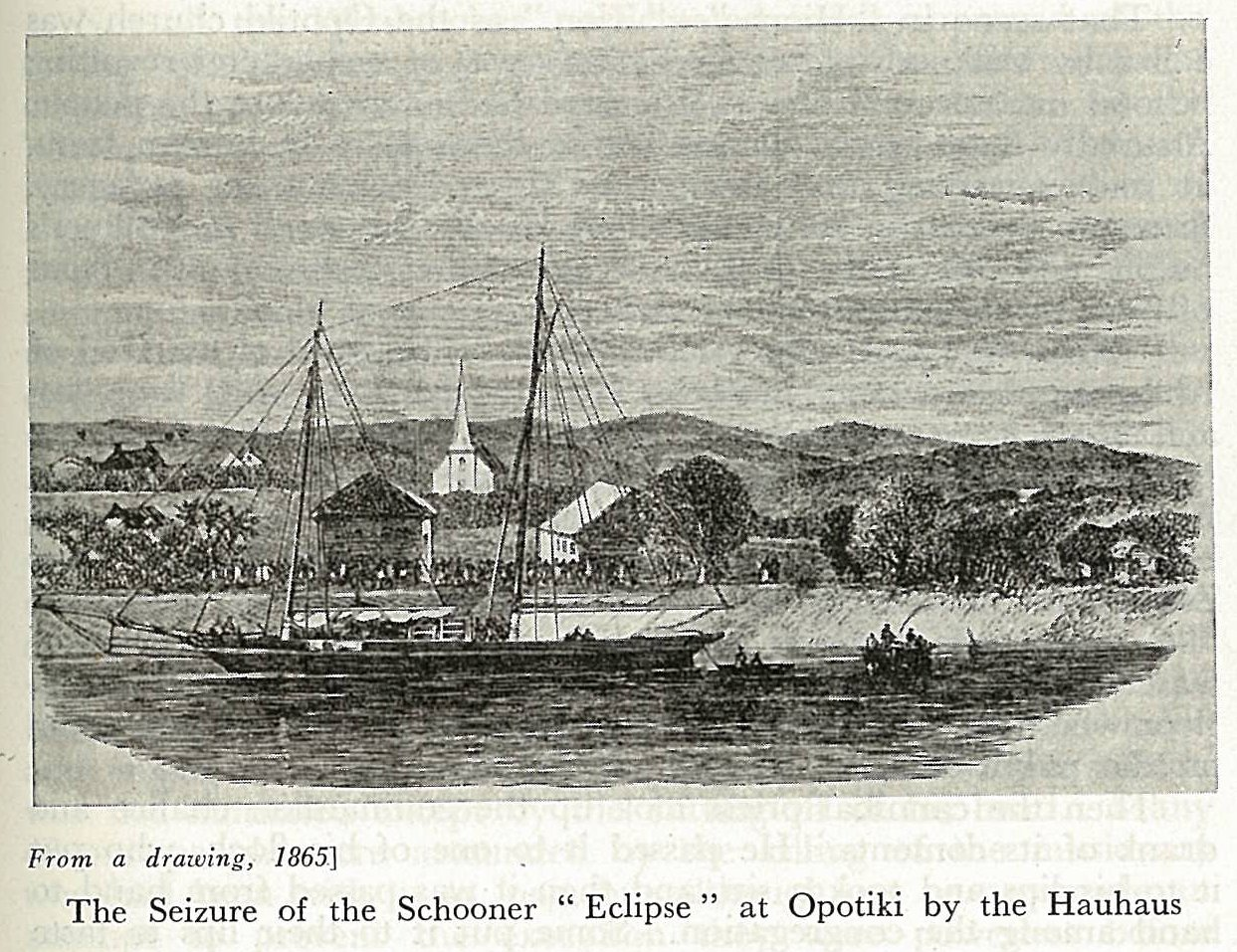
- *Carl Sylvius Völkner, convicted of spying by Ōpōtiki Māori: Kereopa Te Rau after his arrest in December 1871; The SS Eclipse prior to its ransacking by members of the Pai Mārire; Völkner's church in Ōpōtiki in the mid-1860s
- Date: 2 March 1865 – 5 January 1872 (6 years, 10 months and 3 days) Trial of Mokomoko, Heremita Kahupaea, Hakaraia Te Rahui, Horomona Propiti and Mikaere Kirimangu: 27 March 1866 – 17 May 1866 (1 month, 2 weeks and 6 days)
- Location: Northern North Island, Colony of New Zealand (modern-day New Zealand): Ōpōtiki, Te Takiwā-ā-Te Whakatōhea / Auckland Province, Colony of New Zealand (modern day Bay of Plenty); Auckland, Auckland Province (modern-day Auckland); Napier, Hawke's Bay Province. (modern-day Napier, Hawke's Bay); Tūhoe Whenua (modern-day Te Urewera National Park, Hawke's Bay)
- Caused by: Execution of Carl Sylvanius Völkner; Influence of Pai Mārire faith; Colonisation of New Zealand
- Result: Invasion of Ōpōtiki, September 1865; Alleged co-conspirators tried and executed by British crown; Confiscation of 85,000 hectares (211,000 acres) of Ngāi Tūhoe, Te Whakatōhea and Ngāti Awa land; Decline of the Pai Mārire faith

The Völkner incident describes the execution of the German-born Protestant missionary Carl Sylvius Völkner in New Zealand in 1865 by an independent Māori judiciary, consisting of members of the Pai Mārire faith. It has come to be seen by historians as a major and consequential miscarriage of justice by the Government of New Zealand during the New Zealand Wars. The event led to the arrest and execution of several major chieftains, and the confiscation of 85,000 acres of Māori land.

Born in the Electorate of Hesse, Völkner's mission took him to the lands of Te Whakatōhea at the behest of their chieftain, Mokomoko, initially an ally, who patronised him. With Whakatōhea support and guidance he established a church in Ōpōtiki in the Auckland Province (present-day Bay of Plenty). Völkner fell out with Te Whakatōhea after the Invasion of the Waikato, after which point many converted to the nascent Pai Mārire religion. Völkner was soon suspected of spying for the Crown by his former beneficiaries.

Despite hostilities Völkner had remained at Ōpōtiki, making several visits to Auckland in 1864, and again in January 1865. This further aroused suspicion that he was reporting to Governor George Grey on Whakatōhea activities without their approval. Ignoring warnings from several locals, he returned to Ōpōtiki on 1 March. Völkner was arrested almost immediately and tried on charges of espionage by Whakatōhea members of the Pai Mārire. Völkner was found guilty after a night of deliberation, and, sentenced to death, was hanged and decapitated at his church grounds.

In response to Völkner's death, George Grey authorised a military expedition to Ōpōtiki to arrest those who had convicted and executed him. Between 16 and 58 people were killed in the attack, which took place on 11 September 1865, and the pā was burnt to the ground. A number of local people were arrested and some were executed without trial. A large parcel of land, from Matatā to east of Ōpōtiki, was confiscated from eastern Bay of Plenty iwi. Despite being uninvolved in Völkner’s death, Mokomoko was arrested after Ōpōtiki Pā was looted and burnt to the ground by colonial forces. He surrendered to them on the condition that his tribe be left alone, but was wrongfully convicted for the crime, and executed among with several others in Auckland in May 1866.

== Background ==
The Battle of Te Ranga, on 21 June 1864, was the last major conflict of the Tauranga Campaign and is said to mark the effective end of the fighting involved with the Invasion of the Waikato. It left an uneasy peace – not so much a peace as an absence of conflict, one that lasted for several months. This period saw two significant changes in disposition of the warring parties.

The Pai Marire (or Hauhau) movement, a syncretic religious group, was gaining ground and converts among the East Coast Māori. Pai Mārire began in 1862 as a combination of Christianity and traditional Māori beliefs. Originally peaceful, a sub-branch known as Hauhau became violent after experiencing Christian hypocrisy.

Meanwhile, the Imperial Troops were fighting their last campaign in New Zealand before being withdrawn to garrison duty and then complete withdrawal from New Zealand. At the same time the Colonial Militia were being reorganised and rearmed to take up the slack.

== Völkner's trial and execution ==
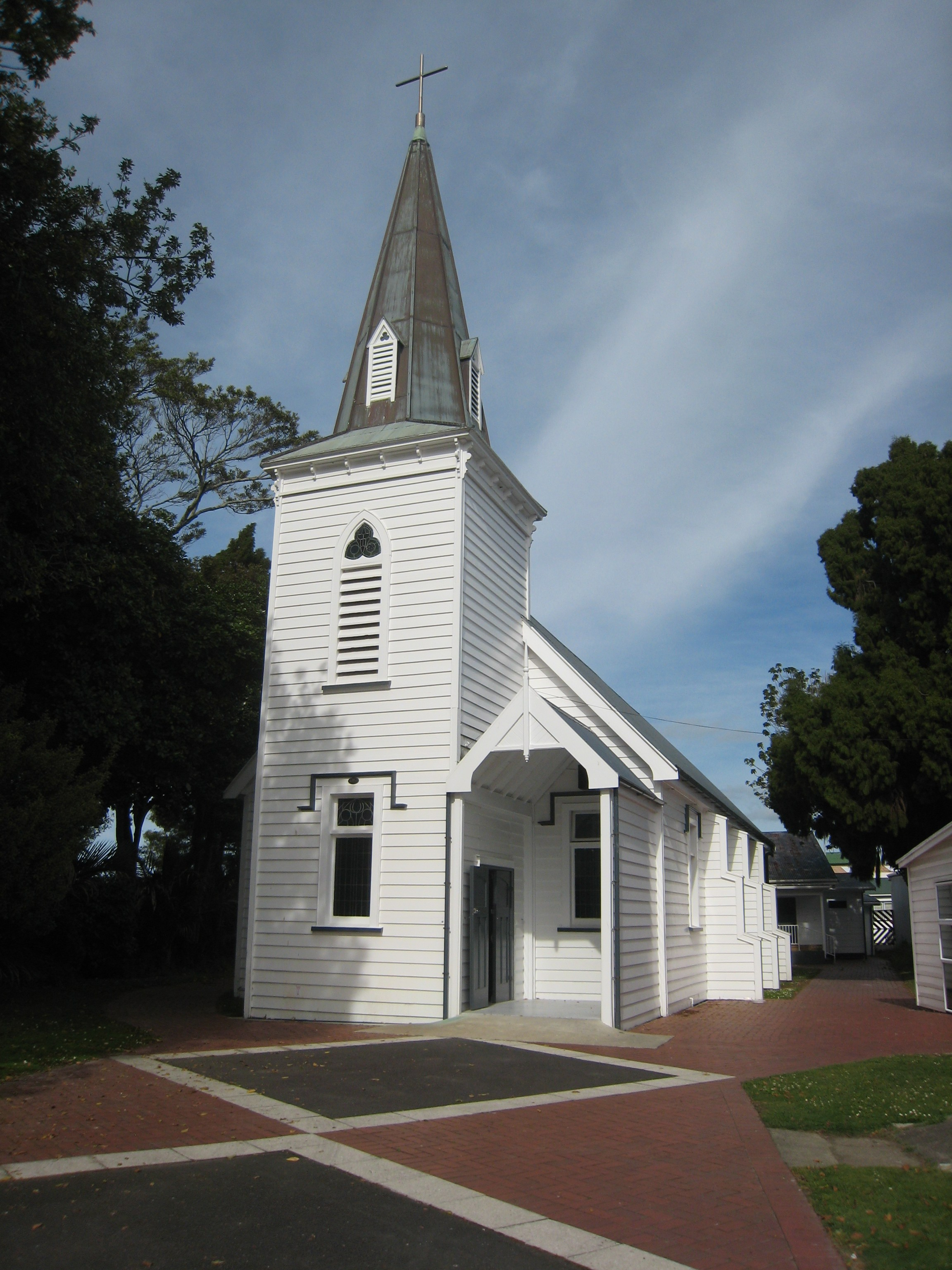
Church of St Stephen the Martyr at Ōpōtiki

Among the Māori community, Völkner was rumoured to be a government spy. It was thought he sent Governor George Grey a plan of a pa near Te Awamutu where British troops burned women and children alive in a whare that had been converted to a church. The wife and two daughters of Kereopa were among the victims. Pai Mārire (or Hauhau) arrived in the Ōpōtiki area of the Bay of Plenty in February 1865. On 2 March Protestant missionary Carl Völkner discovered that his Māori congregation had moved on from Christianity to Pai Mārire (or Hauhau). Like many Europeans in isolated communities, Völkner had sent reports of anti-Government activity to the governor. Although warned to stay away from the town, on his next visit he was captured, put on trial and hanged from a tree, and his body was decapitated an hour later. Kereopa Te Rau, a Hauhau, was alleged to have re-entered the church and conducted a service with Völkner's head in the pulpit beside him. He was also alleged to have plucked out the dead missionary's eyes and swallowed them. One eye allegedly represented Parliament and the other the Queen and British law. News of the murder caused great alarm and anger among Pākehā.

== Response ==
For several months nothing happened—then came the capture of Weraroa Pa—the relief of the siege of Pipiriki in August 1865 that virtually ended that phase of the Second Taranaki War. This freed up the militia for action elsewhere.

George Grey was enraged upon hearing of the execution. He proclaimed its perpetrators “fanatics” and in September 1865 declared martial law in the Bay of Plenty, ordering Ōpōtiki locals to assist government forces or face land confiscation. Then forces then available to the New Zealand government, some 500 men, were transported by HMS Eclipse from Wanganui through Cook Strait, around the East Cape to Ōpōtiki. The composition of this force was significant. There were four companies of militia, a troop of cavalry and a contingent of Ngāti Hau warriors led by Te Keepa Te Rangihiwinui. These were the units that had already been campaigning together during the Taranaki War and had a history of successful cooperation and mutual respect.

The landing at Ōpōtiki was accomplished with difficulty. One of the ships ran aground on a falling tide and came under fire from the shore. Eventually it had to be abandoned and the crew and militia waded ashore but it was another twenty-four hours before the other ships were able to land their men and supplies. Once Grey's men had made successful landfall at Ōpōtiki, they opened fire indiscriminately at the local inhabitants, forcing them to retreat into nearby forest. Rather than pursue them, the Crown troops looted the pā, before burning it to the ground.

As soon as they were established and the snipers driven away, the militia occupied the church where Völkner had been murdered. While some of the Pākehā soldiers worked at turning this into a fortress, the others with Keepa and the Ngāti Hau were turned loose on the countryside. They employed the military tactic of denying the enemy food supplies, keeping what they needed and destroying the rest. Beyond a few muskets the East Coast Hauhau lacked many modern weapons with which to defend themselves. This accounts for the numerous one-sided battles and the Hauhau resorting to attempted treachery to defeat the government forces. It was made clear to them that these depredations would continue until the men responsible for the murder of Völkner were captured or surrendered. But the man they wanted most, Kereopa, had retreated to Tuhoe lands in the Urewera mountains and had no intention of surrendering.

Mokomoko, unaware he was the prime suspect behind the orchestration of Völkner’s death, surrendered in Ōpōtiki on condition that no punishment be inflicted upon Te Whakatōhea. Instead, he and four other men were arrested for murder and tried in Auckland. The rope used to hang Völkner was deemed sufficient evidence for the five men to be sentenced to death. Mokomoko and the other men were executed in Mount Eden Prison on 17 May 1866.

Before he was hanged, Mokomoko said “Tangohia mai te taura i taku kakī kia waiata au i taku waiata” ("Take the rope from my neck that I may sing my song”). He then sang:

Violent shaking will not rouse me from my sleep

They treat me like a common thief

It is true that I embrace eternal sleep

For that is the lot of a man condemned to die.

Shielded from the harsh light

With narrow eyes I reflect on the retribution taken at Hamukete

Remember how I was taken on board ship (chained)

The memory of it burns me with shame.

Bring me justice from distant lands to break my shackles

Where the sun sets is a government in Europe

It is for them to say that I must hang

Then shut me in my coffin box

— Mokomoko, Mount Eden Prison, 17 May 1866

== Aftermath ==
After Mokomoko’s execution, large areas of land around Ōpōtiki were confiscated under the New Zealand Settlements Act of 1863 and sold to settlers.

In the early 1870s, the Ureweras were invaded by the government forces searching for Te Kooti and the Tuhoe were effectively conquered and subdued. They were forced to yield Kereopa to Ropata Wahawaha, and he was tried and hanged for Völkner's murder on 5 January 1872. Some Crown witnesses in the trial were given immunity from prosecution in exchange for their testimony, and Kereopa had no defence witnesses because the Crown would not pay for their travel from Napier. The jury took only about 15 minutes to return their verdict. Kereopa's iwi Ngati Rangiwewehi say that the trial had a predetermined outcome and was a miscarriage of justice.

In 1993, Justice Minister Doug Graham delivered an apology to Te Whakatōhea along with an official pardon of Mokomoko, one of the chiefs hanged. In 1996, the New Zealand Government signed a Deed of Settlement, acknowledging and apologising for the wrongful invasion and confiscation of Te Whakatōhea lands, and the subsequent economic, cultural and developmental devastation suffered by the iwi. In 1998 the New Zealand government offered the Whakatōhea iwi NZ$40 million as compensation for all their historical claims including the invasion and the confiscation of land following the Völkner Incident; however the offer was not accepted. Te Whakatōhea are presently preparing to negotiate a full settlement with the New Zealand Government. As part of the settlement of neighbouring iwi Ngāti Awa's claims in 2003, the Völkner Rocks near Whakaari/White Island were renamed "Te Paepae o Aotea (Völkner Rocks)".

Kereopa was posthumously pardoned in November 2014. This means that Kereopa is no longer guilty of the murder of Völkner. This pardon was part of the Ngāti Rangiwewehi Treaty of Waitangi settlement.

== See also ==
- East Cape War
