= Pai Mārire =

Syncretic Māori religion of the 19th century

Total population
- 609 (2006 census)

Founder
- Te Ua Haumēne

Regions with significant populations
- Predominantly Taranaki, Waikato, Bay of Plenty

The Pai Mārire movement (commonly known as Hauhau) is a syncretic Māori religion founded in Taranaki, New Zealand by the prophet Te Ua Haumēne. It flourished in the North Island from about 1863 to 1874. Pai Mārire incorporated biblical and Māori spiritual elements, and promised its followers deliverance from European domination. Although founded with peaceful motives—its name means "Good and Peaceful"—some followers of Pai Mārire took up arms against the Crown. These extremists were labelled as "Hauhau" or "terrorists" by European settlers. The rise and spread of the violent expression of Pai Mārire was largely a response to the New Zealand Government's military operations against the North Island Māori, which were aimed at exerting European sovereignty and gaining more land for white settlement; historian B.J. Dalton claims that after 1865 any Māori in arms were almost invariably termed Hauhau despite no affiliation to the movement.

Governor George Grey launched a campaign of suppression against the religion in April 1865, culminating in the raiding of dozens of villages in Taranaki and on the East Coast and the arrest of more than 400 adherents, most of whom were incarcerated on the Chatham Islands. Elements of the religion were incorporated in the Ringatū or "Raised hand" religion formed in 1868 by Te Kooti, who escaped from incarceration on the Chatham Islands.

In the 2006 New Zealand census, 609 people identified "Hauhau" as their religion.

== Rise of the prophet ==
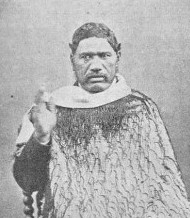
The prophet Te Ua Haumēne, about 1866.

Te Ua Haumēne was born in Taranaki, New Zealand, in the early 1820s. He and his mother were captured and enslaved by a rival tribe in 1826. He learned to read and write in Māori while in captivity and began studying the New Testament. He was baptised by the Rev John Whiteley in the Wesleyan mission at Kawhia in 1834 and given the name of Horopapera Tuwhakararo, a transliteration of the name John Zerubbabel. He later returned to Taranaki.

During the 1850s, he became a supporter of the King Movement, which opposed further expansion of European sovereignty and the sale of land to European settlers, and in the 1860s fought against colonial forces in the First Taranaki War and Waikato War, in which he also acted as a chaplain to the Māori soldiers. By the early 1860s, Te Ua was part of a runanga (local board of management), which administered local government and also ensured that the boundary of the land that was covered by the mana of the Māori King was undisturbed.

By then, the cornerstones of Te Ua's religious teachings were set. He believed Māori had a right to defend the boundaries of their territory; believed in national salvation of the Māori from the white settlers; and suspected that missionaries were aiding and abetting the loss of Māori land.

The elevation of Te Ua to the role of prophet followed an incident in September 1862 in which the British steamer Lord Worsley was wrecked off the Taranaki coast and local Māori debated what action should be taken with the cargo and crew. Te Ua – then living at Wereroa Pā, near Waitotara – argued that goods salvaged from the vessel should be sent to New Plymouth untouched, but was ignored and the cargo was instead plundered. On 5 September, aggrieved over what had taken place, he claimed to have experienced a vision in which the Archangel Gabriel announced to him that the last days of the Bible were at hand and that God had chosen him as a prophet who would cast out the Europeans and restore the lost tribe of Israel (Māori) to their birthright in the land of Canaan (Aotearoa/New Zealand) - adding a religious aspect to the issue of Māori independence, which had until then been a purely political movement.

There are conflicting reports over Te Ua's response to the vision: he is claimed to have killed his child, explaining in a letter circulated to iwi that it was as a redemption for his people, "forgetful, desolate and in doubt". There were other claims he broke a child's leg and healed it miraculously.

As reports about Te Ua began to circulate, he quickly gained a reputation for having other miraculous powers. The view among settlers was less sympathetic: Bishop William Williams claimed Te Ua showed strong signs of insanity and colonial soldier and historian T. W. Gudgeon claimed he had been thus far regarded as a "harmless lunatic" of "weak intellect, but yet of peaceful disposition".

== Formation and spread of the religion ==
Te Ua began to formulate his new religion, complete with a holy book, Ua Rongo Pai (the Gospel according to Ua) which combined elements of Old Testament morality, Christian doctrine, and traditional Māori religion. The goal was to create a peaceful society in which righteousness and justice prevailed. They believed they were a second "chosen people" and that, with divine aid, they would regain control of their hereditary land when the creator, Jehovah, fought for them and drove the English into the sea. To help him propagate the religion, Te Ua chose three men – Tahutaki, Hepenaia and Wi Parara.

The embracing of the religion by some Māori also signalled a rejection of Christianity and a distrust of missionaries over their involvement in land purchases.

The religion gained widespread support among the North Island Māori, but became the cause of deep concern among European settlers as it united tribes in opposition to their authority and helped to inspire fierce military resistance to colonial forces, particularly during the Second Taranaki War, already underway at that time.

=== Ahuahu attack, April 1864 ===
Among settlers, the existence of the new religion was brought into dramatic focus with a series of attacks in April and May 1864. On 6 April, a force led by Tahutaki and Hepenaia mounted an expedition to Ahuahu village, set amid dense bush south of Ōakura, near New Plymouth, believing some Europeans would be delivered into their hands. The group surprised a combined force of the 57th Regiment and the newly formed Taranaki military settlers, a total of 101 men, as they rested without their weapons during a mission to destroy native crops. The Māori force killed seven and wounded 12 of the settler soldiers. The bodies of the seven dead, including their commander, Captain T.W.J. Lloyd, were stripped naked and decapitated. A leg of one of the soldiers was also removed.

The easy victory over the numerically stronger British-led force gave a powerful impetus to the Pai Mārire movement and confirmed in the minds of many Māori the protection of the Archangel Gabriel. Te Ua was now regarded as a prophet. The number of adherents swelled and Pai Mārire rites continued to develop, some incorporating the severed heads of the slain soldiers, through which Te Ua claimed to communicate with Jehovah.

=== Assault on Sentry Hill, April 1864 ===
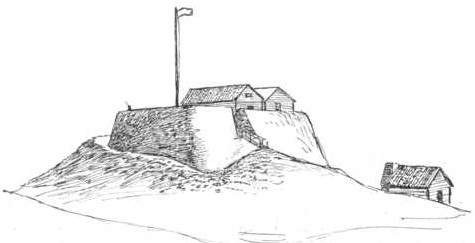
Sentry Hill redoubt, Taranaki, 1863.

Three weeks later, on 30 April 1864, 200 warriors demonstrated their faith in divine protection when they marched on the Sentry Hill redoubt, 9 km north-west of New Plymouth. The redoubt, on the crown of a hill, was defended by 75 imperial soldiers and two Coehorn mortars. Atiawa Māori viewed the construction of the outpost on their land as a challenge and formed a war party. When they came under fire at close range, they shielded themselves from the fusillade only by holding their right hands up and chanting. As many as a fifth of the Māori force were killed in the assault.

In a 1920 interview with historian James Cowan, Te Kahu-Pukoro, a fighter who took part in the attack, explained: "The Pai Mārire religion was then new, and we were all completely under its influence and firmly believed in the teaching of Te Ua and his apostles. Hepanaia Kapewhiti was at the head of the war-party. He was our prophet. He taught us the Pai Mārire karakia (chant), and told us that if we repeated it as we went into battle the bullets would not strike us. This we all believed."

Led by Hepanaia, the warriors participated in sacred ceremonies around a pole at the Manutahi pā, with all the principal Taranaki chiefs present: Wiremu Kīngi Te Rangitāke and Kingi Parengarenga, as well as Te Whiti and Tohu Kākahi, both of whom would later become prophets at Parihaka. The force, armed with muskets, shotguns, tomahawks and spears, marched to Sentry Hill and, at 8AM, launched their attack, ascending the slope that led to the redoubt. Te Kahu-Pukoro recalled:

We did not stoop or crawl as we advanced upon the redoubt; we marched on upright (haere tu tonu), and as we neared the fort we chanted steadily our Pai-marire hymn.

The soldiers who were all hidden behind their high parapet, did not open fire on us until we were within close range. Then the bullets came thickly among us, and close as the fingers on my hand. The soldiers had their rifles pointed through the loopholes in the parapet and between the spaces on top (between bags filled with sand and earth), and thus could deliver a terrible fire upon us with perfect safety to themselves. There were two tiers of rifles blazing at us. We continued our advance, shooting and shouting our war-cries. Now we cried out the 'Hapa' ('Pass over') incantation which Hepanaia had taught us, to cause the bullets to fly harmlessly over us: 'Hapa, hapa, hapa! Hau, hau, hau! Pai-marire, rire, rire – hau!' As we did so we held our right hands uplifted, palms frontward, on a level with our heads – the sign of the ringa-tu. This, we believed, would ward off the enemy's bullets; it was the faith with which we all had been inspired by Te Ua and his apostles.

The bullets came ripping through our ranks. 'Hapa, hapa!' our men shouted after delivering a shot, but down they fell. 'Hapa!' a warrior would cry, with his right hand raised to avert the enemy's bullets, and with a gasp – like that – he would fall dead. The tuakana (elder brother) in a family would fall with 'Hapa!' on his lips, then the teina (younger brother) would fall; then the old father would fall dead beside them.

About 34 Māori and one imperial soldier were killed. Among those shot dead, at almost point-blank range, were chiefs Hepanaia, Kingi Parengarenga (Taranaki), Tupara Keina (Ngatiawa), Tamati Hone (Ngati Ruanui) and Hare Te Kokai, who had advocated the frontal attack on the redoubt. According to Cowan, the slaughter temporarily weakened the new confidence in Pai Mārire, but Te Ua had a satisfying explanation: that those who fell were to blame because they did not repose absolute faith in the karakia.

=== Battle of Moutoa, May 1864 ===
Two weeks later, on 14 May, a Pai Mārire war party from the upper Whanganui River advanced on the settlement of Wanganui, intent on raiding it. In what became known as the Battle of Moutoa, Lower Whanganui kupapa (Māori loyal to the Queen) routed the war party, killing 50 of them including the prophet Matene Rangitauira.

Relieved settlers erected New Zealand's first war memorial at the site—today known as Moutoa Gardens—with an inscription that read: "To the memory of those brave men who fell at Moutoa 14 May 1864 in defence of law and order against fanaticism and barbarism".

=== East Coast killings, March, April 1865 ===
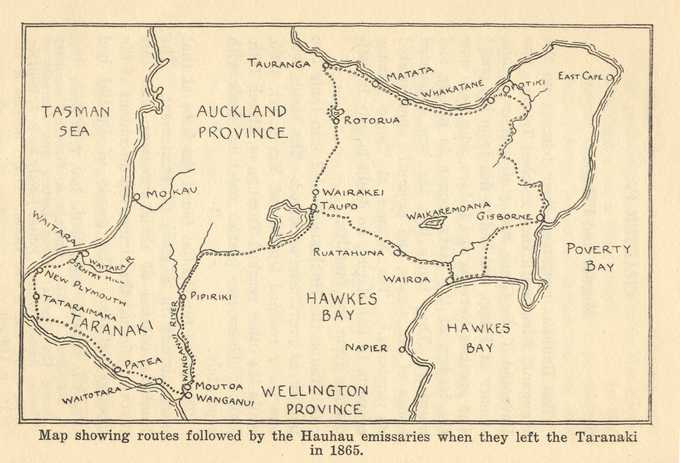
Routes of the Pai Mārire emissaries on the North Island, 1865

The reverses at Sentry Hill and Moutoa Island reinforced Māori belief in Te Ua's movement, with the conviction that the defeats had been caused by disobedience to the leader by the prophets Hepanaia and Matene. More iwi attached themselves to Te Ua. In early 1865, emissaries were instructed to carry "smoke-dried heads" to other regions. They were sent from Taranaki to Chief Hirini Te Kani at Poverty Bay via Whanganui and Taupō in two parties – one via Rotorua, Whakatāne, Ōpōtiki, and East Cape, and the other through the centre of the island via Ruatāhuna and Wairoa.

The emissaries were instructed to proceed peaceably and obtain the support of tribes they passed, delegating their spiritual powers to leading converts in each tribe, who each took up the duties of Pai Mārire priest. But on 23 February, the group clashed at Pipiriki near Wanganui as the "friendly natives, under the command of the chief John Williams, who was head catechist to the Church Missionary House at Wanganui, defended the town against the Hauhau warriors". This defeat led to the decision by the Hauhuas that they would murder any missionaries who came across their path.

Among European settlers, unease grew at the spreading influence of Pai Mārire. In a letter to the Native Minister, the Resident Magistrate for Central Wanganui warned: "The Hauhau fanaticism is spreading very rapidly in the Province, and I fear will be the cause of great mischief. It is now the mainstay of the King movement."

The warning came too late to save the life of one North Island missionary. At Taupō, the Pai Mārire recruiting party ransacked the house of the Rev. Thomas Samuel Grace, and at Opotiki on 2 March shot, hanged and decapitated the German-born Rev. Carl Sylvius Völkner. His head was reportedly taken to the local church, where his eyes were removed and eaten by the prophet Kereopa Te Rau. Kereopa described "one eyeball as Parliament and the other as the Queen and English law". The killing was claimed to be in part revenge for Völkner's activities in spying on local Māori for the government to Governor Grey, and in part Kereopa's wish to bring government retaliation on local Te Whakatōhea Māori as a payback for an earlier intertribal battle with his Te Arawa iwi. Grace, who had fled from Taupō to Opotiki, was arrested and put on trial by the Pai Mārire party. He was rescued from captivity two weeks later by a British man-of-war, HMS Eclipse, after an attempt by local Pai Mārire leaders to exchange him for Tauranga chief Hori Tupaea, who was in prison.

On 22 July, Taranaki prophet Horomona led the murder of the master and two of the three crew members of the schooner Kate at Whakatāne.

== Government suppression ==
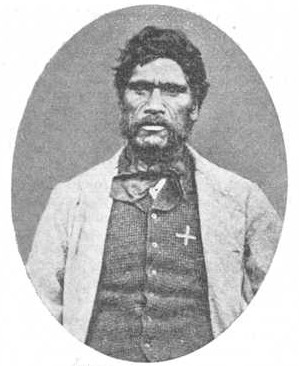
The prophet Patara Raukatauri.

On 29 April 1865, Governor George Grey issued a proclamation condemning the "revolting acts ... repugnant to all humanity" carried out by Pai Mārire followers and warned the government would "resist and suppress by force of arms if necessary, and by every means in my power."

Horomona and Kirimangu were hanged for their 22 July killings on the schooner Kate, and a coalition of government and loyal Māori forces led by Hawke's Bay Province Superintendent Donald McLean embarked on a mission to crush the movement on the East Coast. From June to October 1865, there was a civil war on the East Coast culminating in the battle of Waerenga-a-Hika in Poverty Bay in November. Hundreds of followers were arrested in the campaign, while in Taranaki, a separate campaign led by the increasingly reluctant British commander, General Duncan Cameron, raided dozens of villages to arrest hundreds more adherents.

In February 1866, Te Ua was captured near Ōpunake in Taranaki by Cameron's replacement, Major-General Trevor Chute. Chute claimed Te Ua was immediately abandoned by all those in his village, who swore an oath of allegiance to the Crown and were subsequently set free. Te Ua was taken to Wanganui, writing en route to his North Island supporters, urging: "Let evil be brought to an end ... in order that the General may cease operations against you."

Te Ua and Patara were freed in Auckland and most other leaders were pardoned, but Grey transported 400 East Coast followers, including Te Kooti, to the Chatham Islands for incarceration. Elements of Pai Mārire were later incorporated into the Ringatū religion founded by Te Kooti.

Te Ua died at Oeo in Taranaki in October 1866.

== Rites and beliefs ==
Te Ua's followers identified themselves with the Jews, calling their ministers Teu (Jews) and accepted the Jewish seventh-day Sabbath. They believed they were a second Chosen People and that, with divine aid, they would return from the wilderness to freedom in their hereditary land. Te Ua taught that the Creator, Jehovah, would fight for them and drive the English into the sea.

When the last of the enemy had perished, every Māori who had died since the beginning of the world would be resurrected and stand in the presence of Zerubbabel, healed of all of diseases and infirmities. Their first great day of deliverance would be in December 1864. He urged men and women to abandon monogamy and live together communally in order to produce as many children as possible.

Services were held at a niu, a tall pole, often about 18 m high, with yard-arms from which hung ropes. The first of these niu was the mast of the Lord Worsley. Members of the congregation circled the niu several times a day, chanting and touching a severed head mounted on a pole while priests conducted prayer services. Historian Babbage wrote: "The worshippers worked themselves into a state bordering on frenzy during the procedure of the ritual, until catalepsy frequently prostrated them."

The chants as devotees circled the niu were described by one European commentator as "a jumble of Christian and ancient concepts, of soldier and sailor terms, of English and Māori language with the barking watchword of the cult interspersed". The "angels of the wind" were said to be present during the service, ascending and descending the ropes dangling from the mast's yard-arm. By the end of 1865, a niu stood in almost every large village from Taranaki to the Bay of Plenty and from the north of the Wellington district to the Waikato frontier.

=== The chants ===
Historian James Cowan described many of the chants as "simply meaningless strings of English words...others were either transliterations or mispronunciations of parts of the Church of England services...Latin from the Roman Catholic ritual...military orders...some others showed a nautical origin."

One typical chant began:

Kira, wana, tu, tiri, wha—Teihana!
Rewa, piki rewa, rongo rewa, tone, piki tone—Teihana!
Rori, piki rori, rongo rori, puihi, piki puihi—Teihana!
Rongo puihi, rongo tone, hira, piki hira, rongo hira—Teihana!
Mauteni, piki mauteni, rongo mauteni, piki niu, rongo niu—Teihana!
Nota, no te pihi, no te hihi, noriti mino, noriti, koroni—Teihana!
Hai, kamu, te ti, oro te mene, rauna te niu—Teihana!
Hema, rura wini, tu mate wini, kamu te ti—Teihana!

(Translation)

Kill, one, two, three, four—Attention!
River, big river, long river, stone, big stone—Attention!
Road, big road, long road, bush, big bush—Attention!
Long bush, long stone, hill, big hill, long hill—Attention!
Mountain, big mountain, long mountain, big staff, long staff—Attention!
North, north-by-east, nor'-nor'-east, nor'-east-by-north, north-east, colony—Attention!
Come to tea, all the men, round the niu—Attention!
Shem, rule the wind, too much wind, come to tea—Attention!

=== Divine protection in battle ===
Te Ua taught that the divine service and strict adherence to his instruction would make them impervious to bullets if, when under fire, they would raise their right hand and cry, "Hapa! Hapa! Pai Mārire, hau! Hau! Hau!". "Hapa" meant to pass over, or ward off, while the exclamation "Hau!" at the end of the choruses – said by one soldier to be uttered in a way that sounded like the bark of a dog – had a literal meaning of "wind" but referred to the life principle or vital spark of man, while the wind angels were named "anahera hau".

A similar belief in the mystical power to avert bullets had earlier been reported among groups in Africa and Asia and America, such as the Ghost Shirt Movement.

== See also ==
- Māori religion
- Religion in New Zealand
- East Cape War
