= John Whiteley (missionary) =

English missionary (1806–1869)

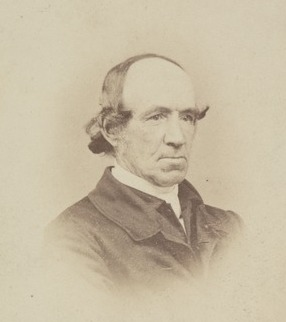
- Born: 20 July 1806; Kneesall, Nottinghamshire, England
- Died: 13 February 1869 (aged 62); Pukearuhe, New Zealand
- Occupation: Missionary

John Whiteley (20 July 1806 – 13 February 1869) was an English missionary for the Wesleyan Missionary Society (WMS) in New Zealand, active from his arrival in the country in 1833 up until his death.

Born in England, he came to New Zealand with his wife and initially settled in the Hokianga where there was an existing WMS mission station. As the WMS expanded its activities in the country, Whiteley later established and ran a mission at Kawhia for several years. He subsequently worked in the Taranaki region, where the colonists there had become embroiled in land disputes with the local Māori. The tensions in the area meant Whiteley, sympathetic to the settlers' cause, found it difficult to carry out his missionary work. On 13 February 1869, he was murdered at Pukearuhe by a Ngāti Maniapoto war party.

== Early life ==
Born on 20 July 1806 at Kneesall in Nottinghamshire, England, John Whiteley was the son of a grocer, James Whiteley, and his wife, Elizabeth née Rainor. He was educated at Farnsfield, after which he started an apprenticeship as a baker. In 1831, he joined the Wesleyan Missionary Society (WMS) for training in the Wesleyan ministry. In September the following year, he married Mary Ann née Cooke. Soon afterwards, at Lambeth Chapel in London, he was ordained into the ministry.

== New Zealand ==
Whiteley and his wife left for New Zealand in October 1832 aboard the New Zealander, arriving there in May the following year. He was initially based at the WMS Māngungu Mission in the Hokianga. Within a few months, his wife gave birth to the couple's first child, a girl, one of six children he would have with his wife. He studied the Māori language, in which he became sufficiently proficient that he was tasked with helping to establish another mission station. The WMS had decided to expand its activities in New Zealand and Whiteley was sent on a reconnaissance visit to Kawhia. Christianity had already reached Kawhia through the activities of Māori, formerly slaves of the Northland iwi (tribes), who had been freed due to the influence of missionaries. Arriving in Kawhia in March 1834, Whiteley was welcomed by local Māori and invited to set up a mission.

On reporting back to the WMS, it was agreed that a mission would be established there. William Woon, who had been a missionary in Tonga, was dispatched to begin the mission in November. He was joined early in 1835 by Whiteley. However, the station was closed in June the following year. The WMS and the Church Missionary Society (CMS) had reached an agreement to end all WMS missions that were south of the Manukau. Whiteley returned to the Hokianga with his family. He was soon in conflict with the WMS superintendent at Māngungu, William White, over his running of the mission. When allegations of impropriety were raised against White, a synod was raised to investigate and Whiteley was one of its members. As a result, White was recalled to England.

In the meantime, Whiteley was sent to Pākanae, close to the mouth of the Hokianga, where he set up a new station which he called Newark. The local iwi was Ngāti Korokoro, and Moetara, its rangatira (chief), had sought a missionary for the settlement. Land was purchased for the mission in January 1838, Whiteley paying with blankets, tools and tobacco. He baptised Moetara in December 1838, giving him the name William King.

=== Life in Kawhia ===
As part of its agreement with the WMS, the Kawhia station was supposed to have been taken over by the CMS. However, this never eventuated and agreement was given for the abandoned WMS stations to be reopened. Whiteley and his family went back to Kawhia and restarted his old mission in 1839. The area where he located the mission became known as Te Waitere, a transliteration of his surname. In its early years, it was also known as Lemon Point, for the lemon trees that he planted there. Their infant son died soon after their arrival.

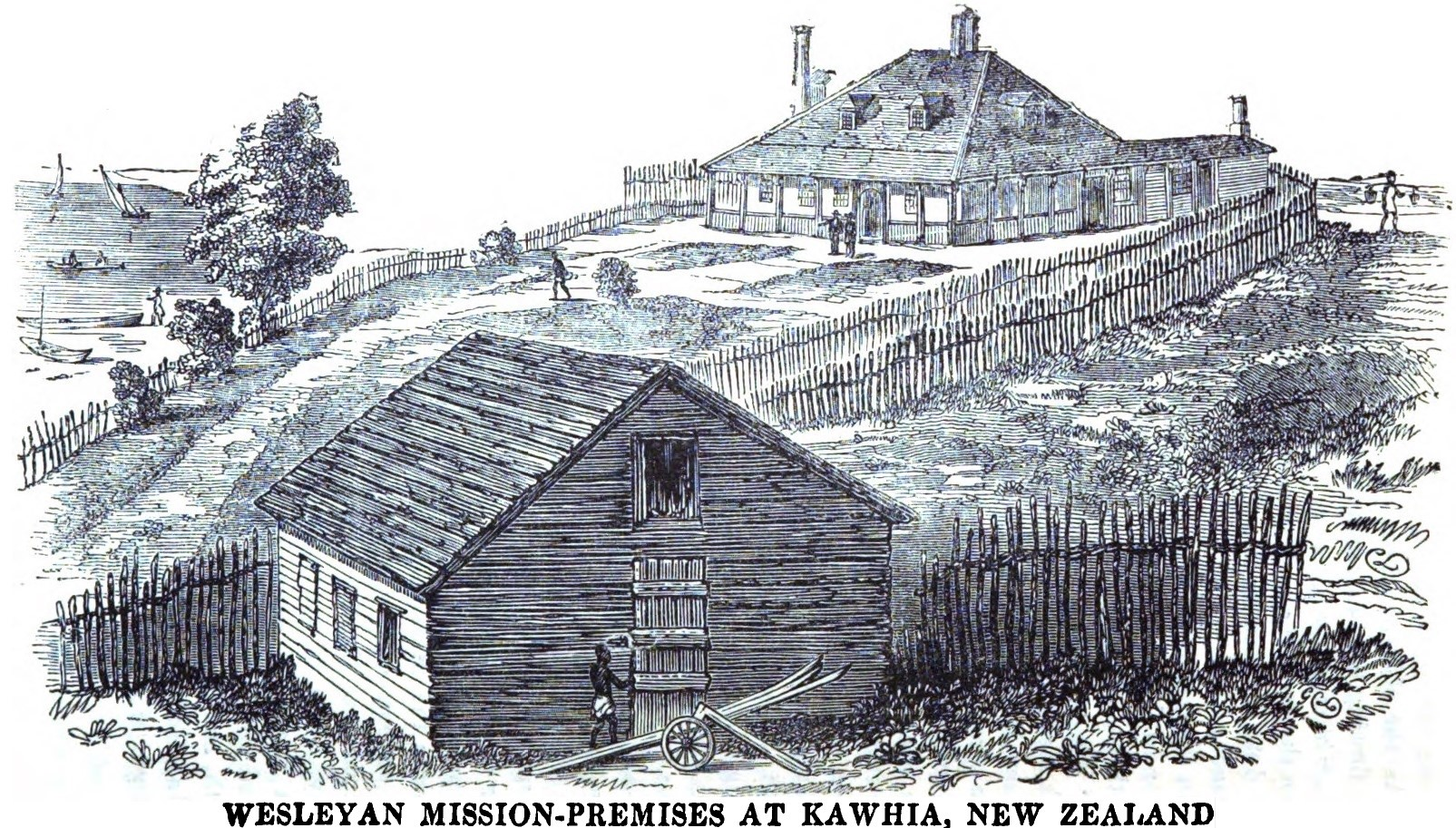
The Wesleyan Mission at Kawhia, 1849

Whiteley proved to be successful as a missionary, baptising increasing numbers of Māori into the ministry. Among them was Te Ua Haumēne, who later became a supporter of the Kīngitanga (Māori King Movement) and founded the Pai Mārire cult. Whiteley gave him the name Horopapera, a transliteration of the name Zerubbabel. By 1840, he had 300 members for his Church and was working towards eliminating slavery, encouraging the release of slaves captured by the local Māori on raids into the Taranaki region. The same year, Whiteley solicited the local rangatira to sign the Treaty of Waitangi.

Despite his success in converting Māori, Whiteley at times was frustrated with some aspects of his work. Much of his time was taken up with travel, either to the villages within his district or visits further afield to Auckland or Sydney. This compromised his availability for his ministrations. He sought to improve literacy, setting up a boarding school for local Māori children, but found that many students were removed when their families, being of an itinerant nature, moved to another village. He was involved in a major hui (gathering) in 1844 at Remuera, involving 17 iwi. Its purpose was to discuss how to best spend money raised through the sale of land on which Auckland was to be built. Education of Māori was recognised as one suitable use of the money. This led to the foundation of Wesley College in Auckland a few years later, with Whiteley as one of its trustees.

In 1847, when the New Zealand Governor was instructed by Earl Grey, the Secretary of State for the Colonies, to requisition unpopulated land for the Crown and sell it onto settlers, Whiteley, considering this tantamount to land confiscation, was among those who protested. He pointed out that Māori had customary rights to unoccupied land and the Crown's actions were contrary to the principles of the Treaty of Waitangi. He considered it an affront to the missionaries, like himself, who in 1840 had encouraged rangatira to sign the Treaty, in the belief that Māori rights to land would be honoured. As a result of his and other missionaries urging, the WMS formally protested to the Colonial Secretary in London; the response, stating the Treaty of Waitangi would be respected, satisfied the WMS but not Whiteley. He continued to agitate on the issue in writing, to the embarrassment of the WMS.

By 1853, there were nearly 500 converts at Kawhia, thanks to Whiteley's work. The following year, he became the chairman of the Wesleyan Church in the Auckland district. He moved to Auckland where he would be based for two years.

=== Taranaki ===
In 1856 Whiteley was sent to Taranaki to preside over the Māori circuit there. He did not desire the posting but the WMS considered his vast experience working with Māori made him particularly suitable for the posting. In contrast to Kawhia, the area had a high population of settlers who had moved there in the belief that land would be easily purchased. On arrival, they had discovered that it was not available; the Māori refused to sell. This resulted in tension between the settlers and local Māori. Additionally, inter-tribal disputes regarding land ownership were also problematic; soon after Whiteley's arrival in Taranaki, two rival rangatira died, leaving their respective iwi at odds and seeking arms and ammunition to potentially resolve the conflict. This contributed to the tensions.

Initially Whiteley settled his family in the mission station just outside of New Plymouth. He became principal of the Grey Institute, a Wesleyan boarding school for the education of Māori youth, but soon found his missionary work was compromised because of the tense state of affairs. The local Māori were more interested in the land issue than matters of Christianity. His fluency in the Māori language meant that he was called upon by Government officials as a translator and adviser, despite concerns regarding his potential bias. In 1859, he was involved in discussions regarding the sale by the rangatira Te Teira, of the Ati Awa iwi of an area of land known as the Waitara Block. However, Kingi Te Rangitake, another rangatira of Ati Awa but of greater seniority, believed he had ownership of the land and disputed the sale. Whiteley believed Te Teira had the right to the land and supported the Government's position that the land sale was valid.

He soon came to favour the settlers' position, taking the view that Māori were rebelling against the Crown in their refusal to sell their land. This was in contrast to his advocacy of 1847 for the Māori claim to unoccupied tribal land. At that time, he had argued that it was inappropriate for Māori land to be registered since some was disputed between rival iwi and furthermore not all rangatira had signed the Waitangi Treaty. This led to the question of what would happen to their land. Now, he advocated that Māori land be handed over to the Government, which would then allocate lots to each individual Māori. He felt that the unoccupied land being denied to the settlers was wasted and that the Māori were acting contrary to God's command to "replenish the earth". His pro-settler stance saw him move his family from the mission station into the town itself, reflecting his greater allegiance to the settlers.

Whiteley supported the Government during the First and Second Taranaki Wars, conflicts with the Taranaki iwi arising from disputed land purchases and religious tensions and which took place in the first half of the 1860s. For part of the war, Whiteley's school, the Grey Institute, was closed but was reinstituted in 1865. During this time, in his sermons to Māori he advocated for them to cease their hostile acts and defer to the Government. In his view, to follow Christianity was to also require allegiance to the Crown and he used scripture to emphasise this. He also reported back to the authorities, providing intelligence on the areas and people he visited while on his ministrations. The WMS and his fellow missionaries felt that Whiteley should be more circumspect in advancing his views, with some expressing concern for his safety. Despite this, he continued to keep up his practice of travelling around the region to preach at Māori villages.

=== Death ===
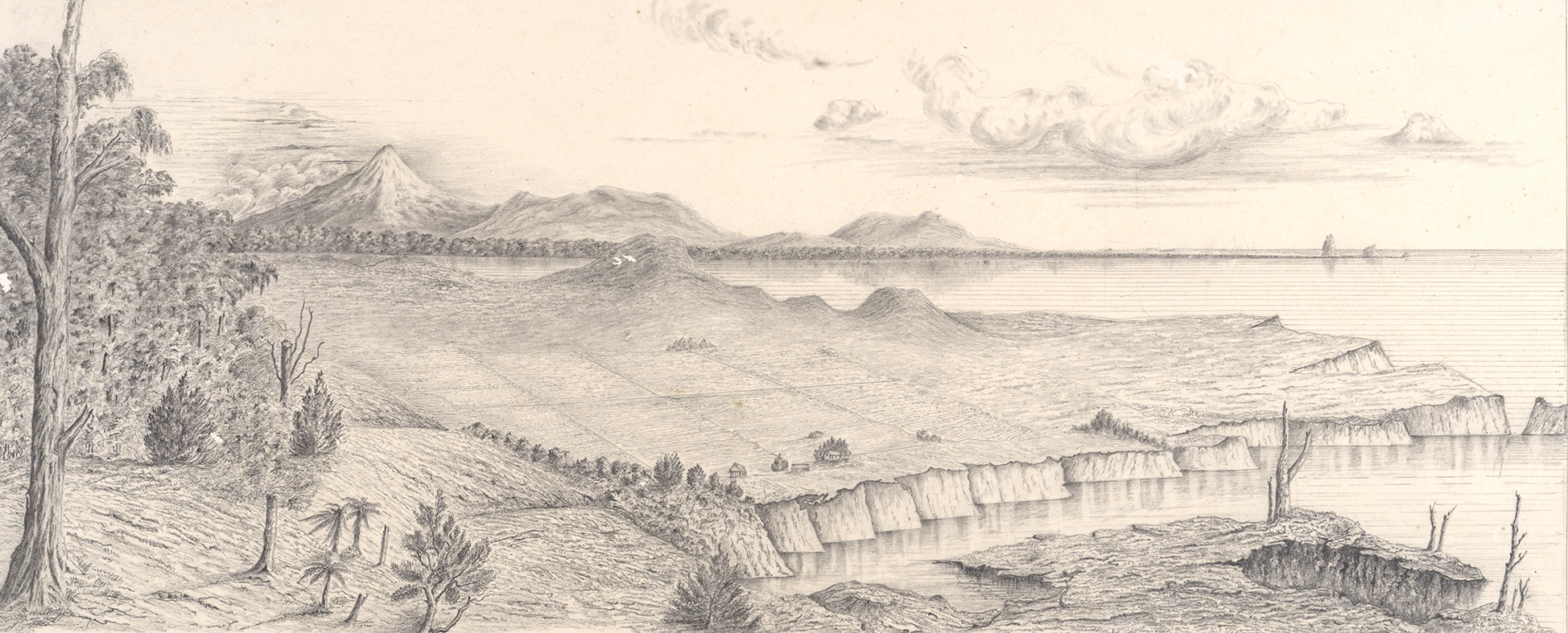
Drawing of Pukearuhe / White Cliffs by Arthur Morrow (1869)

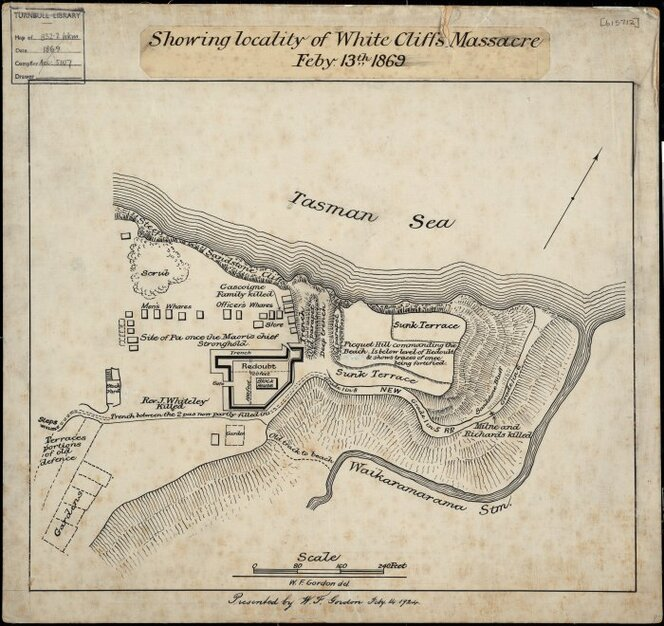
Map drawn in 1920 of the redoubt at Pukearuhe, showing the location of the deaths of the settlers and John Whiteley

On 13 February 1869, a war party of the Ngāti Maniapoto iwi, under the command of Wetere Te Rerenga, attacked Pukearuhe, a redoubt located on confiscated land known as White Cliffs, to the north of New Plymouth. The redoubt had been manned by soldiers up until their withdrawal the previous year and served as a blockhouse for the settlers in the area to retreat to in the event of hostilities. The party murdered seven settlers, including three children and their mother, and Whiteley, who was visiting Pukearuhe. He was shot at least five times and had his belongings looted. His body and those of the settlers were recovered a few days later and taken to New Plymouth for burial at New Plymouth Cemetery. The deaths of Whiteley, the children, and their mother were a shock to both the settlers and local Māori. Colonists speculated that the Kīngitanga was seeking to agitate the situation in Taranaki, inflamed by the activities of the rangatira Tītokowaru, leading the rebellion against the Crown's confiscation of land in South Taranaki. A punitive expedition to nearby Mokau, a Ngāti Maniapoto village, was mounted by the Armed Constabulary in April but it proved to be fruitless for the area was deserted.

Rewi Maniapoto, a rangatira of Ngāti Maniapoto and a leader of the Kīngitanga, later denied any knowledge of the plans to attack Pukearuhe and claimed he would have halted it if he had known. Wetere Te Rerenga, the leader of the war party, claimed that he had tried to prevent Whiteley's murder. There was support among the colonists for Wetere, who was well thought of in the Taranaki. However, this was not believed by Whiteley's family and his grandson, John Whiteley King, urged the Government for a number of years to arrest Wetere and place him on trial. However, there was little political will to do so, and King was ignored. He attempted a private arrest of Wetere but this lacked support and failed.

== Legacy ==
After Whiteley's death, his wife was granted an annual gratuity of £100 by the Government in recognition of his services. When she died, this gratuity was passed onto her unmarried daughter.

Whiteley is listed on the Pukearuhe NZ Wars memorial, in New Plymouth, which commemorates the eight fatalities of the 13 February 1869 attack and was erected in 1871 after a public subscription. Also in New Plymouth, the Whiteley Memorial Methodist Church is named for him. The present structure was built in the early 1960s after the original building, erected in 1898, burnt down. In 1923, a memorial cairn for Whiteley was put up close to the site of his death but this was later demolished. The land on which the cairn was built was part of a Treaty of Waitangi settlement with Ngāti Tama, the local iwi, in 2003. The iwi saw the area as a site of grievance and after the Methodist Church declined to remove the memorial due to a lack of funds, it was demolished after its plaque was removed. Another memorial was erected nearby in 2008.
