= HMS Eclipse (1860) =

Gunvessel of the Royal Navy

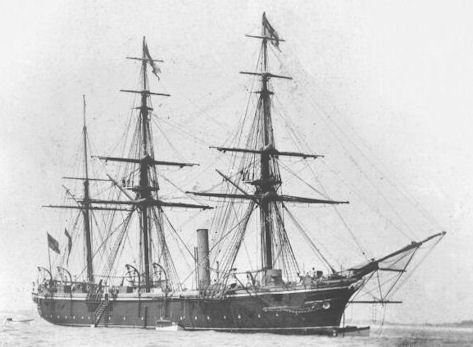
- HMS Cormorant, name ship of the class

History

United Kingdom
- Name: HMS Eclipse
- Ordered: 14 June 1859
- Builder: J. Scott Russell & Co., Millwall; Engines by Robert Napier and Sons
- Laid down: 8 August 1859
- Launched: 18 September 1860
- Decommissioned: 1867
- Fate: Broken up at Sheerness in July 1867

General characteristics
- Class & type: Cormorant-class first-class gunvessel
- Displacement: 877 tons
- Tons burthen: 694 66/94 bm
- Length: 185 ft 0 in (56.4 m) (overall); 165 ft 7 1/4 in (50.5 m) (keel)
- Beam: 28 ft 4 in (8.6 m)
- Draught: 11–12 ft (3.4–3.7 m)
- Depth of hold: 14 ft 0 in (4.3 m)
- Installed power: 200 nhp; 838 ihp (625 kW)
- Propulsion: 2-cylinder horizontal single-expansion steam engine; Single screw
- Sail plan: Barque
- Speed: 11 knots (20 km/h) (under steam)
- Complement: 90
- Armament: 1 × 7-inch/110-pdr Armstrong breech-loading gun; 1 × 68-pdr muzzle-loading smoothbore gun; 2 × 20-pdr Armstrong breech-loading gun

HMS Eclipse was a four-gun Cormorant-class first-class gunvessel launched in 1860 from the shipyard of J. Scott Russell & Co., Millwall. She served on the Australia Station, took part in the Second Taranaki War, including contributing men to a naval brigade which attacked the Maori stronghold at Gate Pā. The entire class were never satisfactory as gunvessels, partly due to their excessive draught, and Eclipse was broken up at Sheerness in 1867, only seven years after her launch.

== Design ==
=== Propulsion ===
The first 6 ships, including Eclipse, had a two-cylinder horizontal single-expansion steam engine provided by Robert Napier and Sons and rated at 200 nominal horsepower, driving a single screw.

=== Armament ===
The main armament, which was principally intended for shore bombardment, was originally designed with two 68-pounder and two 32-pounder muzzle-loading smoothbore guns. They were finished, however, with a single 7-inch/110-pounder Armstrong breech-loading gun and a 68-pounder muzzle-loading smoothbore gun. A pair of broadside 20-pounder Armstrong breech-loading guns were also fitted. The 68-pounders were later replaced by a pair of 64-pounder muzzle-loading rifled guns.

=== Sail plan ===
In common with all other Royal Navy wooden screw gunvessels, the Cormorants were rigged as barques, that is with three masts, with the fore and main masts square rigged, and the mizzen fore-and-aft rigged.

== Construction ==
The first six ships were ordered on 14 June 1859 from commercial yards, with Eclipse built by J Scott Russell at Millwall. The first completed ships had a draught of 11–12 feet (3.4–3.7 m), exceeding the intended eight feet (2.4 m) by a considerable margin. Since gunvessels were intended to work in shallow water while bombarding the shore, work on the later two batches was suspended, with three of the seven suspended ships later completed as survey vessels and the rest cancelled. Eclipse was launched on 18 September 1860.

== Service ==
On 16 October 1862, she collided with the merchant ship Louise in the English Channel off Beachy Head, Sussex. Louise was abandoned; her crew were rescued by HMS Eclipse. Louise survived the encounter, and was taken in to Ramsgate, Kent the next day. She was sent to Australia Station in 1863 under the command of Commander Richard Charles Mayne. During the Second Taranaki War she participated in an attack which was made by the garrison of New Plymouth on the Māori position at the mouth of the Katikara River on 4 June 1864, by shelling the Māori positions from about 1.5 kilometres (0.81 nmi) offshore. Afterwards she was sent back to Australian waters. She towed the New Zealand colonial government river paddle-steamer Pioneer across the Tasman Sea on her delivery voyage from Sydney on 22 September and arriving at Onehunga, New Zealand on 3 October 1863. During the voyage the two ships collided and Eclipse's bow was stoved-in.

In October 1863, Commander Mayne led a naval brigade of 200 seamen which captured Merrimi and later fortified the town. On 20 November a naval brigade of 400 men, under Commander Mayne participated in the battle of Rangiriri during the invasion of Waikato, where five seamen were killed and 10 wounded, including Commander Mayne who was invalided home. Coming under the command of Commander Edmund Fremantle, she took part in the capture of Waikato in January 1864, and contributed to a naval brigade which defeated the Maoris at Rangiawahia. Again on 29 April 1864 she contributed to a naval brigade which attacked the Maori stronghold at Gate Pā. On 1 September 1864, Eclipse ran aground at Tauranga, New Zealand. She ran aground again on 20 October at Wellington. A Court of Enquiry blamed one of her officers on each occasion.

On 13 July 1865, she was driven ashore on the coast of Australia. Repairs cost £3,337. A Court Martial censured several of her officers. In September 1865 the Eclipse was engaged in transporting militia from Whanganui to Ōpōtiki as part of the East Cape War and in response to the Völkner Incident.

== Fate ==
She left the Australia Station in mid-1866 and returned to Britain where she was paid off and broken up at Sheerness in 1867.
