= Te Paepae o Aotea (Volkner Rocks) Marine Reserve =

Marine reserve in New Zealand territorial waters

Coordinates: 37°28′05″S 177°07′48″E

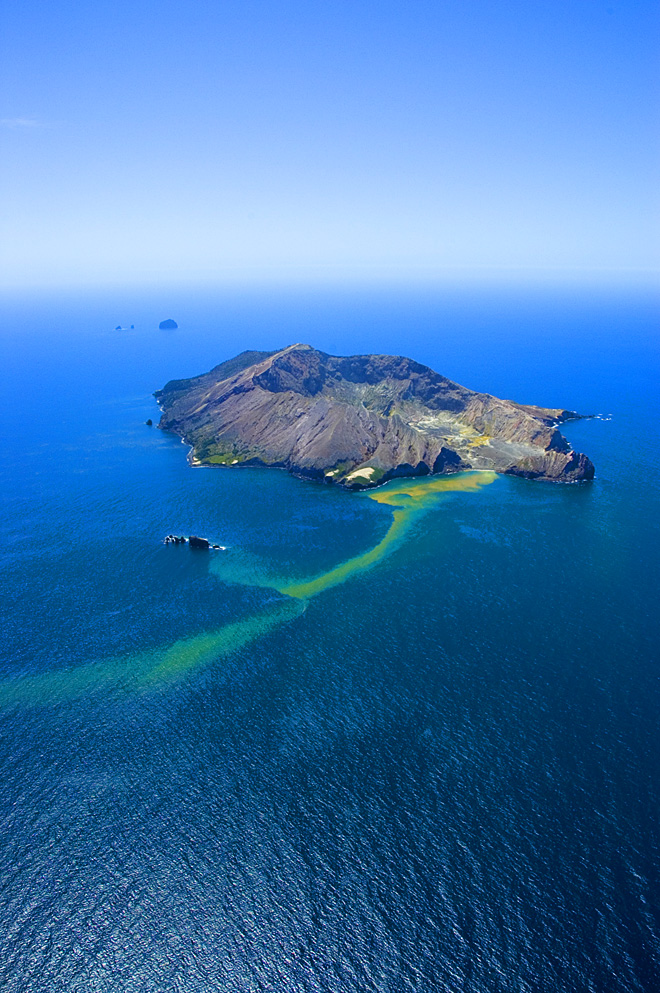
- Te Paepae o Aotea are visible to the upper left, beyond Whakaari/White Island

- Location within North Island
- Location: Bay of Plenty, New Zealand
- Area: 1,267 hectares (3,130 acres)
- Established: 2006
- Governing body: Department of Conservation

Te Paepae o Aotea (Volkner Rocks) Marine Reserve is a marine reserve covering an area of 1,267 hectares (3,130 acres) in the Bay of Plenty of New Zealand's North Island. It includes an area around Te Paepae o Aotea, 55 kilometres (34 mi) north-northwest of Whakatāne and 5 kilometres (3.1 mi) northwest of Whakaari/White Island.

The reserve was established in 2006 and is administered by the Department of Conservation.

== History ==
According to oral history, Te Paepae o Aotea was used as a landmark to show land was close.

The rocks became culturally significant to Ngāti Awa and other iwi descending from the Mātaatua waka, as the departure place for the spirits of all their people. Spirits linger here, leaving the physical world and reuniting with the souls of the departed.

The marine reserve was established on 9 October 2006.

== Flora and fauna ==
The rock pinnacles rise from 400 metres below the sea floor, creating a wide range of habitats. The reserve is affected by oceanic, deepwater influences.

The clear water and warm east Auckland current from subtropical regions north of New Zealand supports a range of diversity, including the rare firebrick starfish, diadema urchin, Spanish lobster and packhorse crayfish.

== Recreation ==
The marine reserve is only accessible by boat. There are several boat ramps, boating facilities and charter boat services, including regular diving and sightseeing excursions. The primary access is by charter boat, including diving and sightseeing excursions.

The Department of Conservation advises only visiting the marine reserve in calm sea conditions, including boats longer than seven metres, due to its distance offshore and exposed location.

Te Paepae o Aotea (Volkner Rocks) Marine Reserve is popular for snorkelling and diving. Underwater visibility is generally good due low levels of sedimentation and run-off, but is poor during seasonal phytoplankton blooms.

The rocks were formerly used as a bombing range for the New Zealand Air Force and some ordinances may remain in place.

A range of activities are banned in the marine reserve, including fishing, taking or killing marine life, and moving or removing any marine life or materials. People must not feed fish as it disturbs their natural behaviour, and they must take care when anchoring to avoid damaging the sea floor.

== See also ==
- Marine reserves of New Zealand
- List of islands of New Zealand
- Desert island
- Marine reserves of New Zealand
