= Kereopa Te Rau =

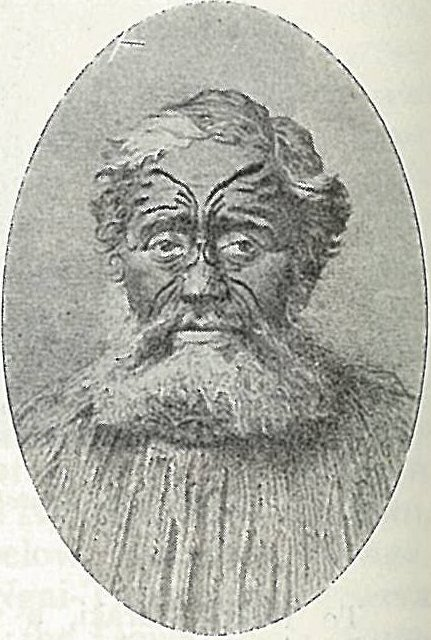
- Born: Unknown
- Died: 5 January 1872; Napier, New Zealand
- Occupation: Religious leader of Pai Mārire

Kereopa Te Rau (? – 5 January 1872) was a leader of Pai Mārire (Hauhau), a Māori religion. He played a key role in the Volkner Incident and was subsequently hanged for his part in it.

== Early life ==
Little is known of Kereopa's early life but he was of the Ngāti Rangiwewehi iwi (tribe) of the Te Arawa confederation of tribes. He was baptised by the Catholic missionary Father Euloge Reignier in the 1840s and was given the Christian name of Kereopa, the Māori pronunciation of the Biblical name Cleopas. He may have served as a police officer in Auckland during the 1850s. He is known to have fought for the King Movement during the Invasion of the Waikato in 1863. His wife and two daughters are believed to have been killed in an attack mounted on 21 February 1864 by government forces on the village of Rangiaowhia near Te Awamutu in 1864. His sister was killed in defence of nearby Hairini the next day.

== Pai Mārire ==
Shortly afterwards Kereopa met up with the prophet Te Ua Haumēne and converted to the Pai Mārire faith. In December 1864 he was sent on a mission to the tribes of the East Coast. His instructions were to go in peace and avoid confrontations with the Pākehā. While he was at Ōpōtiki the missionary Carl Volkner was seized, tried, hanged and decapitated by his own congregation in what became known as the Volkner Incident. Immediately afterwards Kereopa preached a sermon from Volkner's pulpit during which he gouged the missionary's eyes out of his head and ate them.

Kereopa and his Pai Mārire followers went on to Gisborne, and then to the Urewera mountains to preach to the Tūhoe people. In 1865 he tried to return to the Waikato but was repulsed by a war party of Ngāti Manawa and Ngāti Rangitihi, kūpapa Maori who supported the government. Following the resulting battle Kereopa is said to have eaten the eyes of three of the slain enemy. For this and the eating of Volkner's eyes, he was nicknamed Kai Whatu (Eye Eater). He then retreated to the Ureweras where he found refuge and remained in hiding for the next five years.

In the early 1870s government forces searching for Te Kooti entered the Ureweras. The Tūhoe were conquered and British colonial law and order was established. Kereopa, who had a bounty of £1,000 for his capture, was hiding near Ruatahuna. Major Ropata Wahawaha led a Ngāti Porou party there and Tūhoe handed over Kereopa to him on 18 November.

Kereopa was tried for Volkner's murder in Napier on 21 December 1871. He was convicted and, despite appeals for clemency from the missionary William Colenso, who noted punishment had already been meted out for the crime, was hanged in Napier on 5 January 1872. His iwi Ngati Rangiwewehi say that the trial had a predetermined outcome and was a miscarriage of justice. Kereopa was posthumously pardoned as part of a Treaty of Waitangi settlement in 2014.
