= Carl Sylvius Völkner =

German Protestant missionary

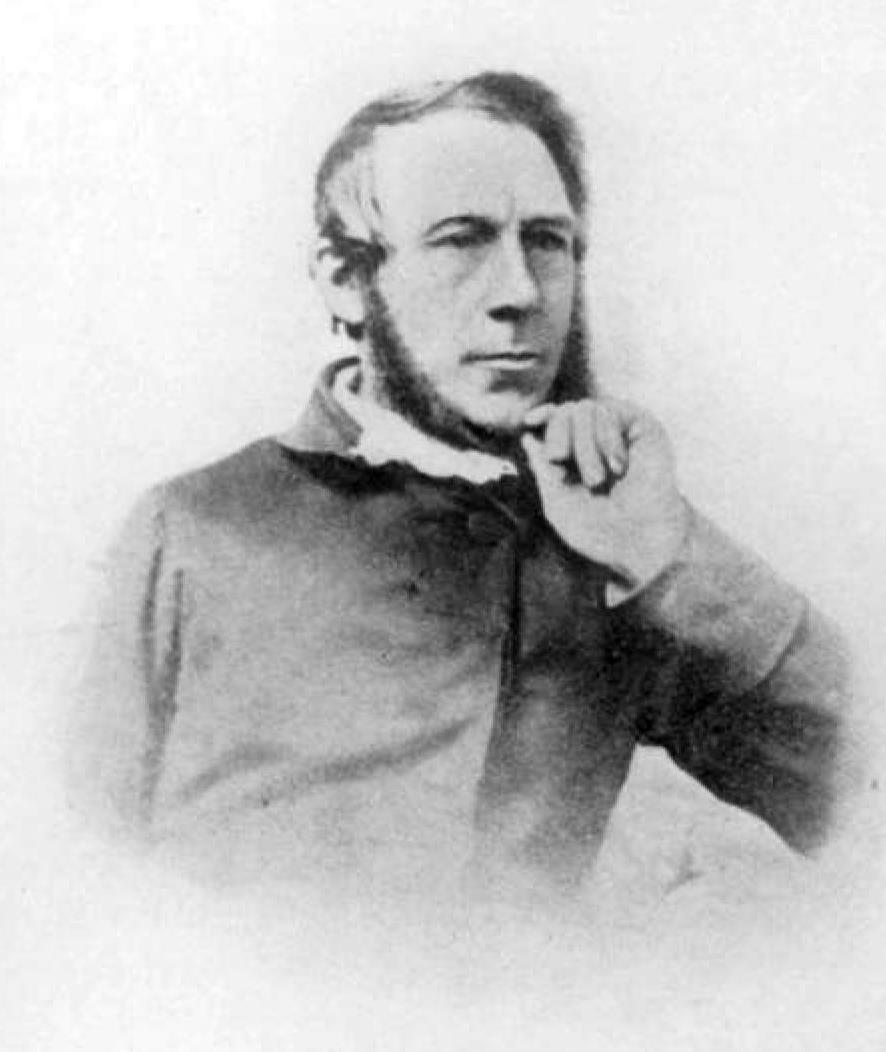
- Carl Sylvius Völkner
- Born: c. 1819; Kassel, Electorate of Hesse, German Confederation (present-day Hesse, Federal Republic of Germany
- Died: 2 March 1865 (aged 45–46); Ōpōtiki, New Zealand
- Cause of death: Hanging
- Burial place: Hiona St Stephen's, Ōpōtiki; 38.003683°S 177.284823°E
- Spouse: Emma Völkner née Lanfear

Carl Sylvius Völkner (German pronunciation: [fœlknɐ]; c. 1819 – 2 March 1865) was a German-born Protestant missionary active in the North Island of New Zealand during the mid-nineteenth century. He is famous for being tried and executed for espionage by members of the Pai Mārire faith at his church in Ōpōtiki, in the Bay of Plenty. This later became known as the Völkner incident, an important event in the New Zealand Wars.

== Biography ==
Völkner was born in the town of Kassel, in the Electorate of Hesse, Germany, around 1819. He trained at the missionary college at Hamburg. He was then sent to New Zealand by the North German Missionary Society, along with several other missionaries. He arrived in the country in August 1849 and was sent to Taranaki, to work alongside another German missionary, Johann Riemenschneider.

In 1852 Völkner offered his services to the Church Missionary Society (CMS). He married Emma Lanfear, sister of a CMS missionary on 29 June 1854. For several years he worked as a lay teacher in the lower Waikato and in 1857 became a naturalised citizen. Völkner was ordained a deacon in 1860 and the following year, in August, he became a priest and took charge of the CMS mission station at Ōpōtiki. The local iwi (tribe) was Te Whakatōhea and soon a church and school were built in the area.

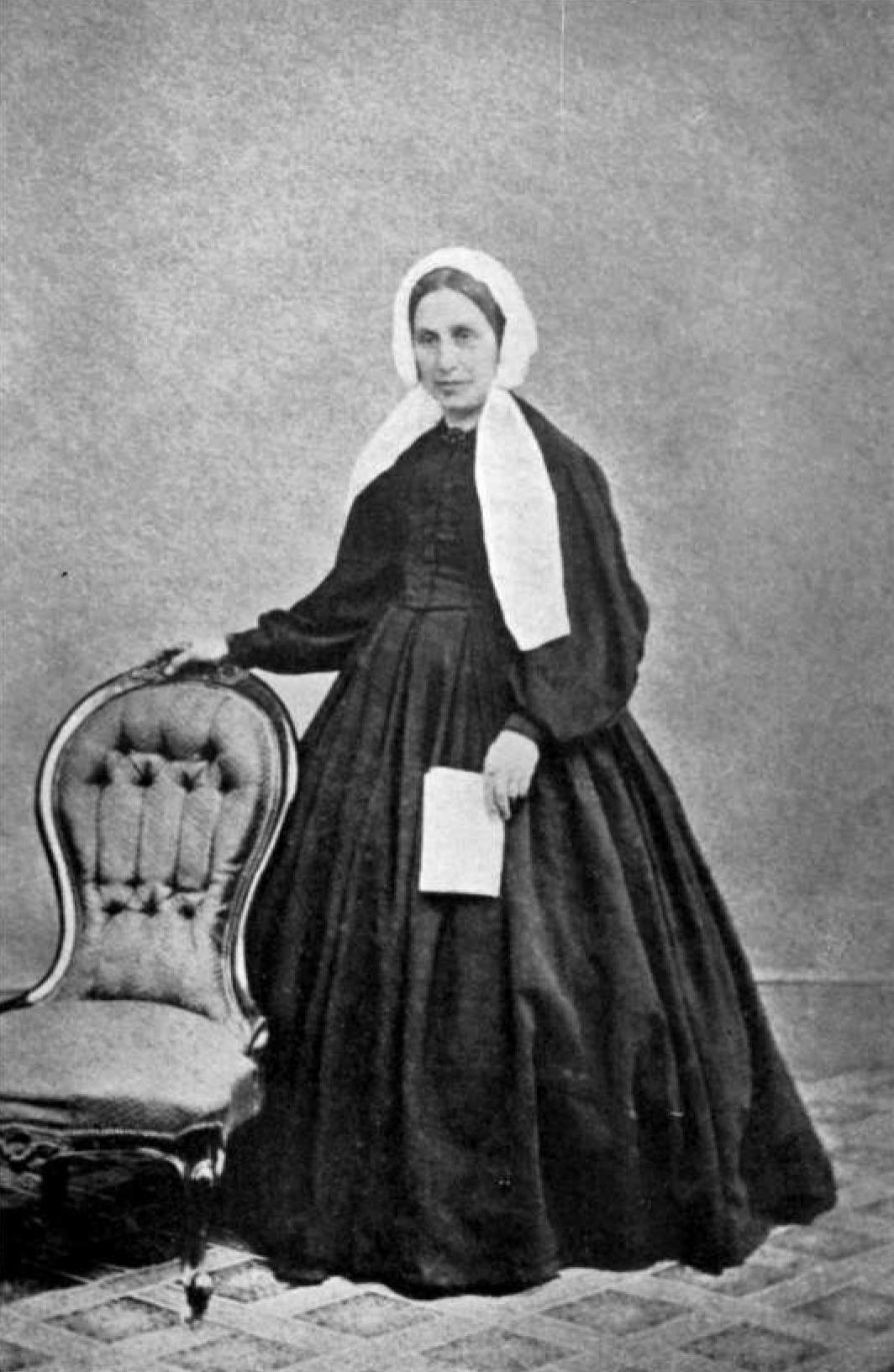
Emma Völkner, his wife

== Death ==
On 19 May 1864 Völkner recorded that four of the 16 Christian teachers of the Ōpōtiki district had accompanied a Pai Mārire (Hauhau) campaign to Maketu, although not as active participants in the fighting. He went to Auckland during 1864 and again in January 1865. He was then warned by members of Te Whakatōhea not to return to Ōpōtiki.

Ignoring the warning, Völkner returned to Ōpōtiki on 1 March 1865 and was apprehended by the Pai Mārire led by Patara, a chief, and Kereopa Te Rau, a Pai Mārire prophet. Völkner was hanged the following day from a willow tree near the church by his own Whakatōhea congregation. He was taken down and decapitated, and his eyes were gouged out and swallowed by Kereopa Te Rau. Kereopa apparently proclaimed that the left eye represented Parliament, and the right represented British authority as he did so, to ingest the mana of both. The Revd Thomas Grace, who was also in Ōpōtiki, was also taken by the Pai Mārire, although he was rescued.

George Grey was enraged upon hearing of the execution. He proclaimed its perpetrators “fanatics” and in September 1865 declared martial law in the Bay of Plenty, ordering Ōpōtiki locals to assist government forces or face land confiscation. Once Grey's men had made successful landfall at Ōpōtiki, they opened fire indiscriminately at the local inhabitants, forcing them to retreat into nearby forest. Rather than pursue them, the Crown troops looted the pā, before burning it to the ground. Mokomoko, unaware he was the prime suspect behind the orchestration of Völkner's death, surrendered in Ōpōtiki on condition that no punishment be inflicted upon Te Whakatōhea. Instead, he and four other men were arrested for murder and tried in Auckland. The rope used to hang Völkner was deemed sufficient evidence for the five men to be sentenced to death. Mokomoko and the other men were executed in Mount Eden Prison on 17 May 1866. His remains were repatriated to Whakatōhea in 1988, after 7 years’ worth of Waitangi Tribunal hearings; he was posthumously given an unconditional pardon in 1992.

Kereopa Te Rau, who ate Völkner's eyes, fled into Tūhoe country after Grey sent troops to the Bay of Plenty. He lived in secret in the hamlet of Ruatahuna for five years. After the fall of the Tūhoe state in 1871, he was captured by kūpapa Ropata Wahawaha while he was searching for Te Kooti in the Ureweras. Kereopa was tried for Volkner's murder in Napier on 21 December, and the jury decided his fate the same day. He was executed on 5 January 1872, despite appeals for clemency. Kereopa was pardoned unconditionally in November 2014.

== Legacy ==
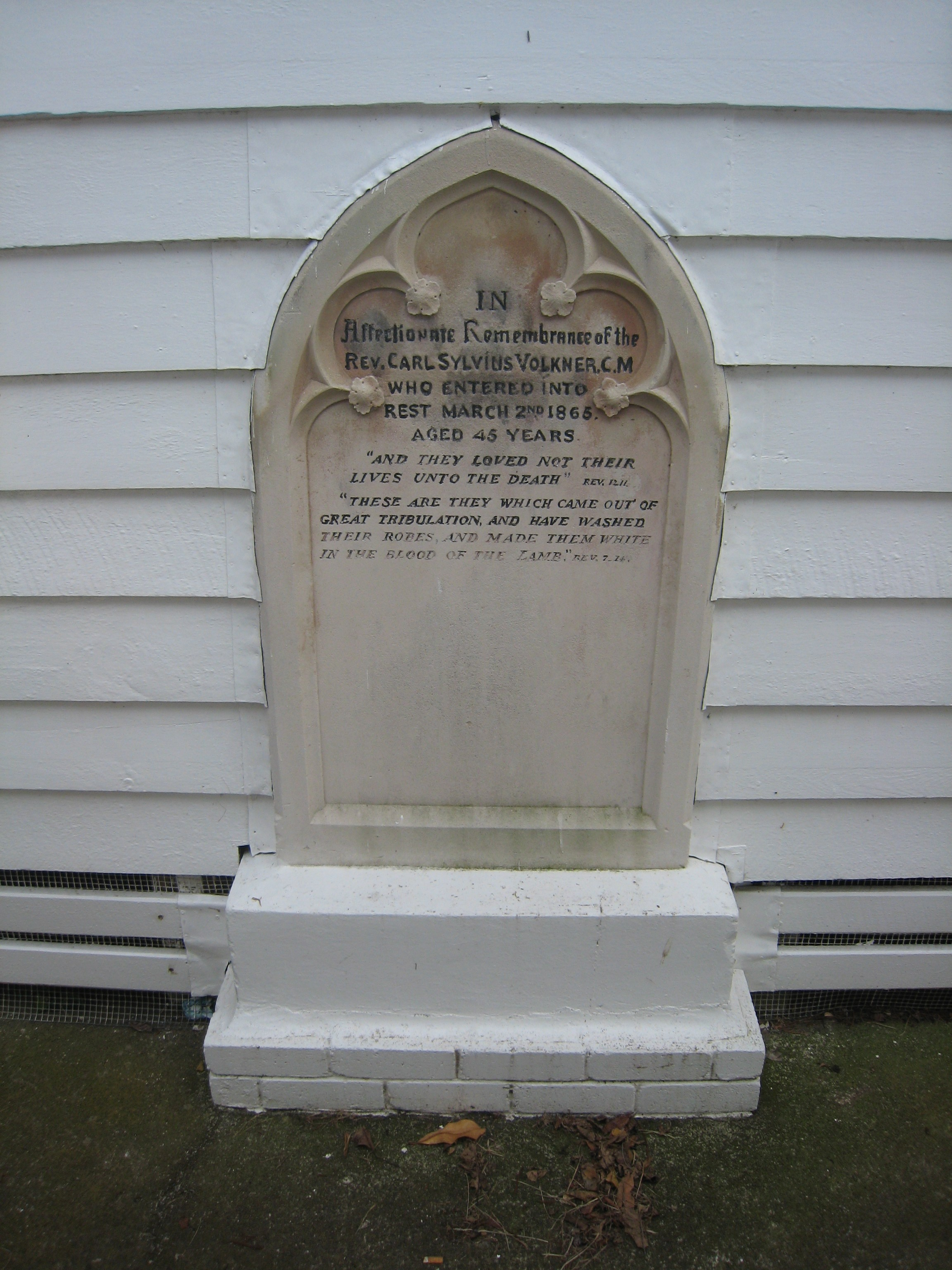
Völkner's gravestone now stands embedded in the Ōpōtiki church wall

The Anglican church in Ōpōtiki was reconsecrated as St Stephen the Martyr in memory of his death on 21 November 1875. His bible, chalice and paten are still held at the church. After pardon was later granted to those involved in Völkner's death, the church was renamed again as Hiona St Stephen's on 5 June 1994

Te Paepae o Aotea, also known the Volkner Rocks, are named after him.

== See also ==
- Völkner Incident
- Christianity in New Zealand
