= Te Paepae o Aotea (Bay of Plenty) =

Island group in New Zealand

Te Paepae o Aotea Volkner Rocks
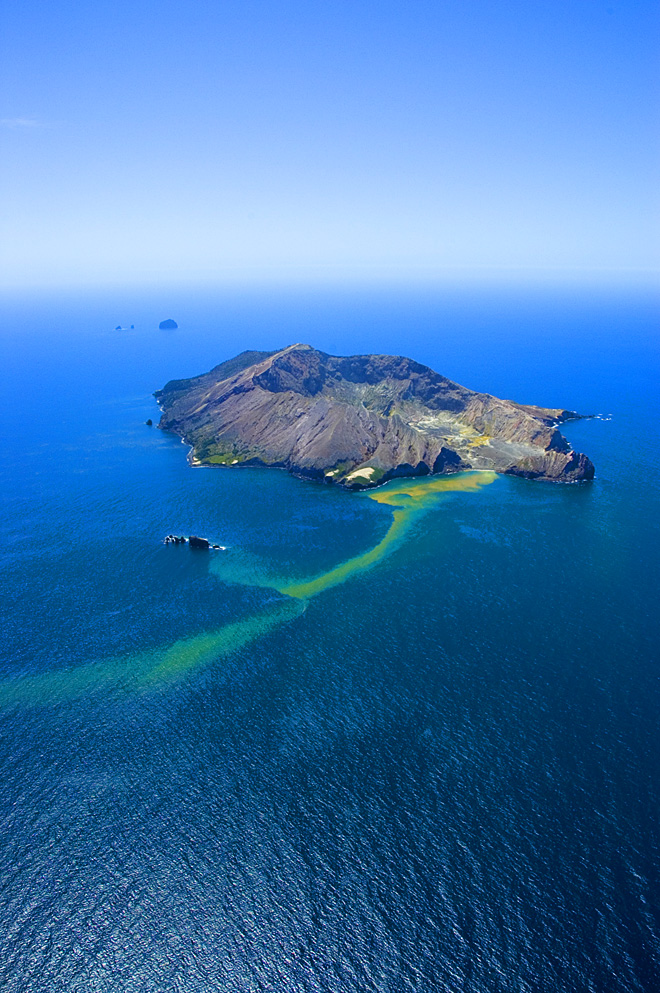
- Te Paepae o Aotea are visible to the upper left, beyond Whakaari / White Island

- Location within North Island

Geography
- Coordinates: 37°28′05″S 177°07′48″E

Administration
- New Zealand
- Region: Bay of Plenty

Te Paepae o Aotea, also known the Volkner Rocks (named after Carl Sylvius Völkner), are a group of andesitic rock stacks and pinnacles located 5 kilometres (3.1 mi) northwest of Whakaari / White Island in New Zealand's Bay of Plenty. They reach 113 metres above sea level from 400 metres below the sea floor, while the saddle separating them from Whakaari / White Island is over 200 metres deep.

Te Paepae o Aotea (Volkner Rocks) Marine Reserve was established around them in 2006. The area is popular with divers due to good visibility (35–40 m), its scenery and colourful marine life.

The rocks and marine reserve are accessible by boat. There are several boat ramps, boating facilities and charter boat services in Eastern Bay of Plenty.

== History ==
According to oral history, Te Paepae o Aotea was used as a landmark to show land was close.

The rocks became culturally significant to Ngāti Awa and other iwi descending from the Mātaatua waka, as the departure place for the spirits of all their people. Spirits linger here, leaving the physical world and reuniting with the souls of the departed.

The marine reserve was established on 9 October 2006.

== See also ==
- Marine reserves of New Zealand
- List of islands of New Zealand
- Desert island
