= Alexandra Redoubt, Tuakau =

Military fortification in New Zealand

Alexandra Redoubt
- Tuakau, New Zealand
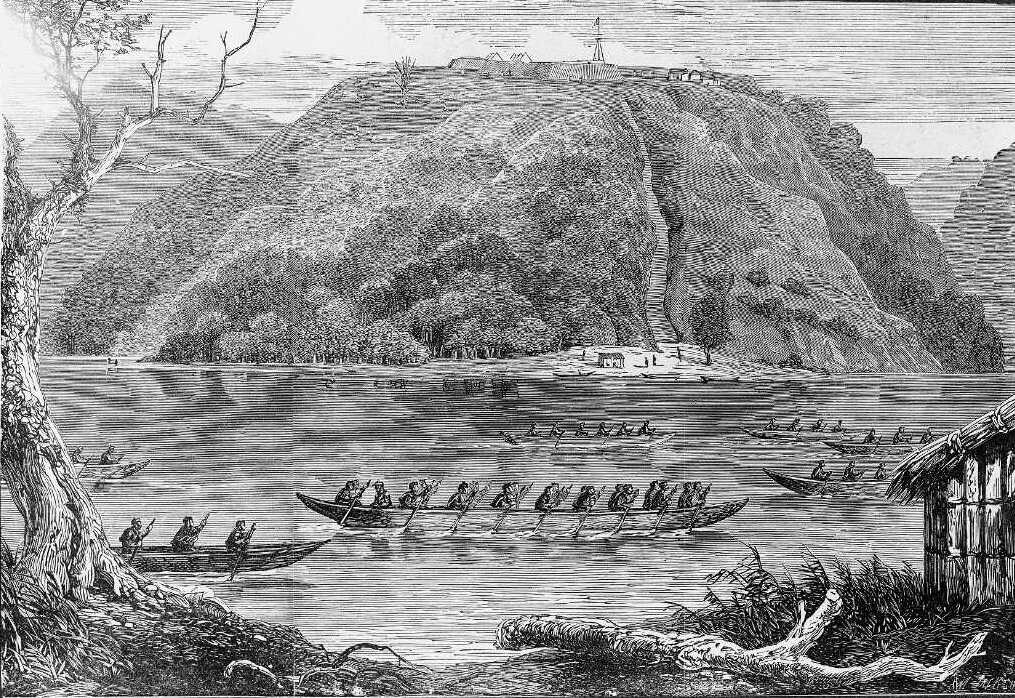
- A view of Alexandra Redoubt, at the crest of the hill in the centre; drawn by Henry Warre in 1863

Site information
- Type: Redoubt
- Open to the public: Yes

Location
- Coordinates: 37°17′10″S 174°56′30″E.

Site history
- Built: July 1863
- Materials: Earthworks
- Battles/wars: New Zealand Wars: Invasion of the Waikato

Garrison information
- Garrison: 65th Regiment of Foot

Alexandra Redoubt is a fortification of the New Zealand Wars, located at Tuakau, New Zealand. Overlooking the Waikato River, it was built to protect the British supply routes during the Invasion of the Waikato. Erected in July 1863, it was garrisoned until October the following year at which time it was abandoned. It is now a historic reserve.

== History ==
The Waikato War, one of the conflicts of the New Zealand Wars, spanned the period from July 1863 to April 1864. At the beginning of the war, Tuakau was a Maori kāinga (village) of the hapū (sub-tribe) Ngāti Pou in the Lower Waikato Valley on the northern side of the Waikato River, to the southeast of what is now Pukekohe.

On 12 July 1863, the same day that the invasion of the Waikato commenced, Lieutenant Colonel Alfred Wyatt departed Drury for Tuakau with a party of 300 men of the 65th Regiment of Foot, where they arrived the next day. Evicting the local Māori, they proceeded to build a redoubt on the northern bank of the river. The fortification was named Alexandra Redoubt, after Alexandra of Denmark, who had earlier in the year married Prince Albert, the future King of England.

The placement of Alexandra Redoubt was to help secure the flank of the invasion route into the Waikato for the army of General Duncan Cameron, commander of the British forces in New Zealand. It also helped guard the supply line that was subsequently established along the river; steamers from Onehunga would transfer food and munitions to canoes at Port Waikato, and these would make their way up the Waikato River to the Queen's Redoubt at Pōkeno, Cameron's base for the invasion. Once Alexandra Redoubt was completed, 150 men of the 65th Regiment of Foot were stationed there, under the command of Captain Richard Swift.

On 7 September, around a taua (war party) of 100 warriors of the Kīngitanga (Māori Kīng movement) attacked Camerontown, a depot a few kilometres downstream from Alexandra Redoubt. It was guarded by a force of kūpapa, Maori warriors from Ngāti Whauroa that were allied to the British. Coincidentally, five British officials, one the resident magistrate for the Lower Waikato, were present, having arrived ahead of a supply convoy. They were killed while the kūpapa put up a half-hearted resistance and let Camerontown be destroyed. Swift led a party of 50 men from Alexandra Redoubt in pursuit of the taua but were ambushed in an action during which he and several others were killed. The remaining British were led back to the redoubt by Colour Sergeant Edward McKenna, who was subsequently awarded the Victoria Cross as was another man, Lance Corporal John Ryan.

Once the British forces moved further south, the risk to the Waikato supply route was reduced. The contingent of men from the 65th Regiment of Foot departed and the redoubt was manned by men of the Waikato militia until October 1864, when it was abandoned. The adjacent area was used as a cemetery. A memorial to the soldiers of the British Army and local militia killed at Camerontown and elsewhere in what was known as the Franklin District was unveiled in December 1916.

== Description ==
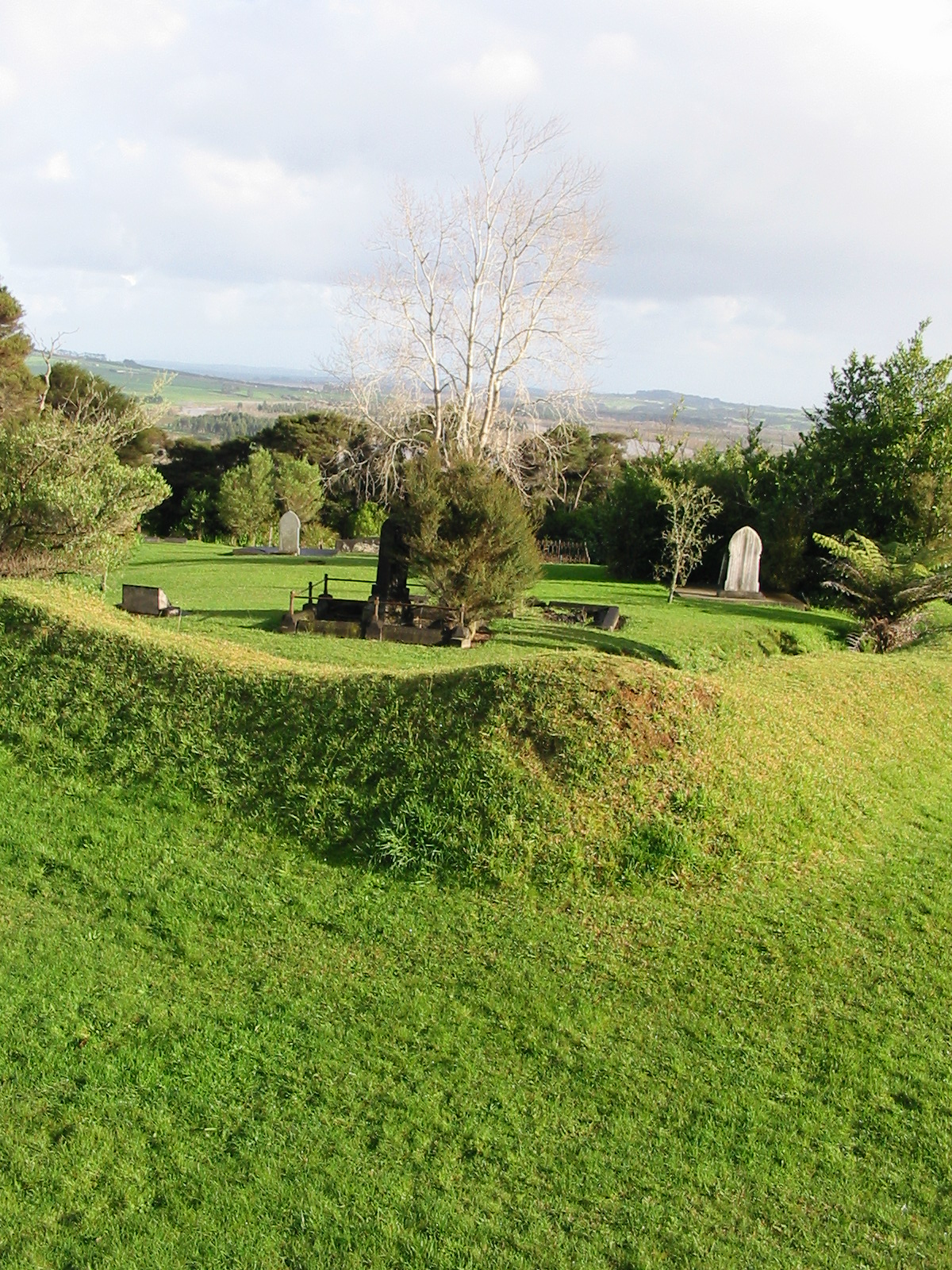
A view of a portion of Alexandra Redoubt as it currently appears

A redoubt is a type of fortification which, since it did not require timber elements, could be constructed relatively quickly by troops in the field. Usually taking a square or rectangular plan form, they were prepared by excavating a ditch to a depth of around 1.8 metres (5.9 ft) to define the perimeter of the redoubt. The dug out earth was piled up on the inner side of the ditch to form a parapet, the reverse side being profiled to include a firing step. The overall height of the parapet, from the base of the ditch to its top, would be around 4.2 metres (14 ft).

Alexandra Redoubt, around 1 kilometre (0.62 mi) south of modern-day Tuakau, is positioned on a hilltop about 100 metres (330 ft) high overlooking the Waikato River. It has a rectangular plan, of about 50 metres (160 ft) by 20 metres (66 ft), with bastions provided to two corners to cover all sides of the fortification. A stone path is inlaid into the parapet, which is not a typical feature of redoubts. The total area of the redoubt was around a third of a hectare. Steps which led down to the Waikato River are no longer present.

According to Prickett, the redoubt, which is fully grassed, is in excellent condition. Indications of any outbuildings and the like were destroyed during the construction of the adjacent cemetery. The site is currently a historic reserve and is accessible from Alexandra Redoubt Road.
