= Camerontown =

British Army supply depot in New Zealand

- Locality
- Interactive map of Camerontown
- Coordinates: 37.259°S 174.88°E
- Country: New Zealand
- Region: Waikato region
- District: Waikato District
- Wards: Awaroa-Maramarua General Ward; Tai Raro Takiwaa Maaori Ward
- Electorates: Port Waikato; Hauraki-Waikato (Māori)

Government
  - Territorial Authority: Waikato District Council
  - Regional council: Waikato Regional Council
  - Mayor of Waikato: Aksel Bech
  - Port Waikato MP: Andrew Bayly
  - Hauraki-Waikato MP: Hana-Rawhiti Maipi-Clarke
- Time zone: UTC+12 (NZST)
  - Summer (DST): UTC+13 (NZDT)

Camerontown or Cameron Town was a British Army supply depot used during the Invasion of the Waikato during the New Zealand Wars in 1863, and later a small settlement.

== Location ==
The depot was on the north bank of the lower Waikato River, west of Tuakau and south of Pukekohe. It was named after the British commander, Lieutenant General Duncan Cameron.

== History ==
During the advance into the Waikato in 1863, a supplementary line of supply was established. Supplies were taken by steamer from Onehunga to the Waikato Heads, then transported upriver in canoes by Queenite Māori to the intermediate depot at Camerontown, then to the Queen's Redoubt at Pōkeno. The use of water transport was more efficient than the overland route of fifteen miles. As it was a major British supply route the Kingite Māori decided to destroy it. A party of a hundred Ngāti Maniapoto from Pukekawa launched a surprise attack on the morning of 7 September 1863. They took Camerontown, and burnt the depot and its protective pa and over forty tons of supplies. The depot was defended by 4 Europeans and 20 Ngāti Whauroa. Five defenders were killed, including Mr Armitage. The British were in a canoe.

The British troops from the Alexandra Redoubt at Tuakau were informed of the attack and sent out a detachment of 50 men. The detachment commander, Captain Swift of the 65th Regiment attacked what they thought were Kingites drunk on captured rum, but were met by a massive volley which felled both officers (Swift and Lieutenant Butler, who was disabled) and several men. The survivors beat a hasty retreat. They were hunted through the bush until nightfall, but the Ngāti Maniapoto Kingites did not press home their attack.

Two British soldiers, Colour Sergeant Edward McKenna and Lance-Corporal John Ryan were awarded the Victoria Cross for their action that day, when McKenna took over command after the death of Captain Swift, and they protected his body. Sergeant Bracegirdle and four privates (Bulford, Cole, Talbot and Thomas) were awarded the Distinguished Conduct Medal.

Later the settlement was the birthplace of Harold Abbott, a rugby union footballer and member of the legendary 1905 Original All Blacks.
