= Waikato-Maniapoto Maori Claims Settlement Act 1946 =

Act of New Zealand Parliament

Waikato-Maniapoto Maori Claims Settlement Act

New Zealand Parliament
- Long title: An Act to effect a Final Settlement of certain Claims relating to the Confiscation of Maori Lands in the Waikato District, and to provide for the Control and Administration of the Moneys granted as Compensation.

Legislative history
- Passed: 7 October 1946
- Status: Repealed

The Waikato-Maniapoto Maori Claims Settlement Act 1946 was an act passed by the New Zealand Parliament on 7 October 1946. The act sought to redress the confiscation of Māori lands in the Waikato District that had been taken under the New Zealand Settlements Act 1863. It granted the affected tribes an annual payment of £5,000 (later $15,000) in perpetuity. This settlement was later reassessed and replaced by the Waikato Raupatu Claims Settlement Act 1995.

Waikato-Tainui lands were confiscated in or about 1864 and 1865, on the basis that the owners, or some of them, had rebelled against the Crown. In response to claims that lands had been improperly confiscated or that excessive quantities of land had been confiscated, a commission of inquiry (the "Sim Commission") was appointed in 1926. The commission's report recommended that the members of the tribes in the Waikato district whose lands had been confiscated should be compensated by an annual payment. The act established the Tainui Maori Trust Fund, which would receive the payments, and the Tainui Maori Trust Board, which would administer the fund for the benefit of the members of the "Tainui tribes" who had owned the confiscated lands in the "Waikato district".

Waikato Tainui never considered the 1946 settlement as final, and considered the offer to be a fait accompli by the government. The government later acknowledged this and began a dialogue with the Waikato-Tainui iwi in 1989, which led to the 1995 settlement.

The Tainui Maori Trust Fund was disestablished by the Waikato Raupatu Claims Settlement Act 1995.

== See also ==
- Waikato Raupatu Claims Settlement Act 1995
- Invasion of the Waikato
