= Robert Walpole (British Army officer) =

Lieutenant-General Sir Robert Walpole KCB

Personal details
- Born: 1 December 1808
- Died: 12 July 1876 (aged 67) Grove, West Molesey, Surrey
- Spouse: Gertrude Ford (before 1876)
- Relations: John Perceval, 2nd Earl of Egmont (grandfather); Spencer Horatio Walpole (brother); Horatio Walpole, 1st Earl of Orford (cousin)
- Children: 9
- Parent(s): Thomas Walpole; Lady Margaret Perceval
- Education: Eton College

Military service
- Allegiance: United Kingdom
- Rank: Lieutenant-General
- Unit: British Army
- Commands: 65th (2nd Yorkshire, North Riding) Regiment of Foot

Lieutenant-General Sir Robert Walpole KCB (1 December 1808 – 12 July 1876) was a British Army officer.

== Early life and education ==
Walpole was the second son of diplomat Thomas Walpole of Stagbury Park, Surrey and Lady Margaret Perceval, the eighth daughter of John Perceval, 2nd Earl of Egmont. His elder brother was Spencer Horatio Walpole and his first cousin was Horatio Walpole, 1st Earl of Orford.

He was educated at Dr. Goodenough's school at Ealing and at Eton College and received a commission as ensign in the Rifle Brigade on 11 May 1825.

== Career ==
He was promoted to lieutenant the following year and served with his corps in Nova Scotia (1825–36), Ireland, Birmingham during the bread riots (1839), Jersey, and Malta (1841–43). He rose through the ranks to lieutenant-colonel in 1847, when he was appointed to the staff as deputy-adjutant and quartermaster-general at Corfu. He remained there until 1856, having been promoted to colonel in the army in 1854.

In 1857 Walpole went to India to take part in the suppression of the Indian Mutiny. He arrived at Cawnpore early in November, and commanded, under Major-general Windham, a detachment of the Rifle Brigade at the Pandu Nudda. On 28 November, in command of the left brigade, he defeated the right attack of the Gwalior contingent, and Windham reported that Walpole had 'achieved a complete victory over the enemy and captured two 18-pounder guns.’

Walpole commanded the 6th brigade of the army under Sir Colin Campbell at the Battle of Cawnpore on 6 December 1857. The brigade was composed of the 2nd and 3rd battalions of the Rifle Brigade and a detachment of the 38th Foot. Crossing the canal and moving along the outskirts of the western face of the town, Walpole successfully prevented the enemy's centre from supporting their right, which had been turned by the British 4th and 5th brigades. On 18 December Walpole, with a detached corps of the army, consisting of the 6th brigade with the addition of a field battery, a troop of horse artillery, and a company of sappers, marched through the Doab, captured Etawa on 29 December, and on 3 January 1858 reached Bewar, where Brigadier-general Seaton's force, which had arrived already, came under his command. Walpole, with the combined force, joined Sir Colin Campbell at Fatehgarh on the following day.

=== Capture of Lucknow ===
The town of Lucknow had been abandoned to rebel forces after Sir Colin Campbell had raised the Siege of Lucknow the previous year (1857). While Sir Colin Campbell made preparations for its recapture an attack was feigned on Bareilly to keep the Rohilkhand rebels in check, and Walpole was sent with his force to make a demonstration against 15,000 rebels assembled at Allahganj on the banks of the Ramganga river, a mission which he carried out to the satisfaction of the commander-in-chief.

In February 1858 Walpole's force crossed the Ganges with the rest of the army into Oudh on the way to recapture Lucknow, at which Walpole commanded the third division, comprising the 5th and 6th brigades. He occupied the Dilkusha position on 4 March, and moved under Sir James Outram across the Gumti early on the morning of the 6th to take the enemy in reverse. On the evening of the same day he encamped about four miles from and facing the city. On 9 March, after a heavy cannonade, he attacked the enemy's left, driving the rebels to the river and joining the British left at the Badshah Bagh. On the 11th Walpole gained a position commanding the iron bridge. He surprised and captured the camp of Hashmat Ali Chaodri of Sandila, together with that of the mutinous 15th irregulars, taking their standards and two guns. He retained the positions he occupied, and kept up an enfilading fire, raking the positions which the commander-in-chief was assailing on the other side of the river. When Outram entered Lucknow on the 16th, Walpole was left to watch the iron and stone bridge, and repulsed a strong attack made upon his pickets.

=== After Lucknow ===
After the capture of Lucknow Walpole was sent in command of a division, consisting of the 9th Lancers, the 2nd Punjab Cavalry, the 42nd Foot, the 79th Foot, and the 93rd Highlanders, the 4th Punjab Rifles, two troops of horse artillery, two 18-pounder guns, two 8-inch howitzers, and some engineers, to march through Rohilkhand. He left Lucknow on 7 April, and on the 15th attacked Fort Ruhya, and was repulsed with considerable loss, although the enemy evacuated the fort the same night. Walpole's conduct of this operation has been severely censured but the strictures passed upon him were undeserved. On the occasion in question Walpole undervalued his enemy, and in consequence many valuable lives were lost; but the commander-in-chief was fully cognisant of all that took place, and, so far from losing confidence in Walpole, continued to employ him in positions of trust and in important commands. Walpole reached Sirsa on 22 April, and defeated the rebels at Allahganj, capturing four guns. On the 27th he was joined by the commander-in-chief, marched on Shahjahanpur, which, on the 30th, they found evacuated by the enemy, and pushed on without opposition, reaching Miranpur Katra on 3 May. Walpole commanded the troops under Lord Clyde at the Battle of Bareilly on 5 May, when he was wounded by a sabre cut, and his horse wounded in three places. He commanded the Rohilkhand division from 1858 to 1860, and commanded in person at the fight of Maler Ghat on the river Sarda on 15 January 1859, when, with 360 men, 60 only of whom were Europeans, he entirely defeated 2,500 of the enemy and took two guns.

=== Later life ===
For his services in the Indian mutiny Walpole received the medal with clasp for Lucknow; he was made first a Companion, and then a Knight Commander, of the Order of the Bath, military division, and he received the thanks of Parliament. In 1861 he commanded the Lucknow division, but in the same year was transferred to the command of the infantry brigade at Gibraltar. He was promoted to be major-general on 30 May 1862; brought home in 1864 to command the Chatham military district which he relinquished in 1866 and given the Colonelcy of the 65th (2nd Yorkshire, North Riding) Regiment of Foot in 1869. He was promoted Lieutenant-General on 25 October 1871 and was selected for command at the autumn manœuvres of 1872.

== Personal life ==
He married Gertrude Ford, the youngest daughter of General William Henry Ford of the Royal Engineers and had nine children, of which two sons and three daughters survived him. Walpole died on 12 July 1876 at the Grove, West Molesey, Surrey.

A watercolour portrait of Walpole by Alfred Edward Chalon (1826) and an oil portrait by John Phillip (1847), both in Rifle Brigade uniform, were formerly in possession of his widow, Lady Walpole of Hampton Court Palace.

Military offices
Preceded by Robert Bartlett Coles	Colonel of the 65th Regiment of Foot; 1869–76	Succeeded by Robert Newton Phillips
