= John Ryan (VC 1863) =

Irish recipient of the Victoria Cross

John Ryan VC
- Born: 1839; Borrisoleigh, Ireland
- Died: 29 December 1863 (aged 23–24); Tuakau, New Zealand
- Military career
- Allegiance: United Kingdom
- Branch: British Army
- Rank: Lance Corporal
- Units: 65th Regiment of Foot
- Conflicts: New Zealand Wars: Invasion of Waikato
- Awards: Victoria Cross

John Ryan VC (1839 – 29 December 1863) was a British Army soldier and an Irish recipient of the Victoria Cross, the highest award for gallantry in the face of the enemy that can be awarded to British and Commonwealth forces.

== Early life ==
Ryan was born in Borrisoleigh, County Tipperary in 1839.

== Victoria Cross ==
Ryan was about 24 years old, and a lance corporal in the 65th Regiment of Foot (later the 1st Battalion, York and Lancaster Regiment), during the Invasion of Waikato (one of the campaigns in the New Zealand Wars), when the following deed took place on 7 September 1863, for which he was awarded the VC.

For gallant conduct at the engagement near Cameron-town above referred to. This Non-Commissioned Officer, with Privates Bulford and Talbot, of the same Regiment, who have been recommended for the Medal for distinguished conduct in the Field, for their behaviour on the same occasion, removed the body of the late Captain Swift from the Field of Action, after he had been mortally wounded, and remained with it all night in a bush surrounded by the enemy.

Ryan died at Tuakau, New Zealand, on 29 December 1863, before he received the medal. He drowned while trying to save a drunken comrade in the Waikato River.

== The medal ==
His Victoria Cross is displayed at The York & Lancaster Regiment Museum (Rotherham, South Yorkshire, England).
