= Harrisville, New Zealand =

Harrisville
- Locality
- Interactive map of Harrisville
- Coordinates: 37.2394°S 174.952°E
- Country: New Zealand
- Region: Waikato
- District: Waikato District
- Wards: Tuakau-Pōkeno General Ward; Tai Raro Takiwaa Maaori Ward
- Community: Tuakau Community
- Electorates: Coromandel; Hauraki-Waikato (Māori)

Government
  - Territorial Authority: Waikato District Council
  - Regional council: Waikato Regional Council
  - Mayor of Waikato: Aksel Bech
  - Port Waikato MP: Andrew Bayly
  - Hauraki-Waikato MP: Hana-Rawhiti Maipi-Clarke

Area
  - Total: 4.18 km^{2} (1.61 sq mi)
- Elevation: 80 m (260 ft)

Population (2023 census)
  - Total: 117
  - Density: 28.0/km^{2} (72.5/sq mi)
- Time zone: UTC+12 (NZST)
  - Summer (DST): UTC+13 (NZDT)

Harrisville is a locality about 3 km northeast of Tuakau and 5.5 km southeast of Pukekohe in the North Island of New Zealand.

The area was named for an early landowner and politician, Benjamin Harris, and was largely settled by Danes.

== History ==
The population decline of Harrisville is evinced by the town going from weekly church services to having none at all in 1914.

== Demographics ==
Harrisville is in an SA1 statistical area which covers 4.18 km^{2} (1.61 sq mi) The SA1 area is part of the larger Tuakau Rural statistical area.

Historical population for Harrisville
Year	Pop.	±% p.a.
2013	138	—
2018	126	−1.80%
2023	117	−1.47%

Harrisville had a population of 117 in the 2023 New Zealand census, a decrease of 9 people (−7.1%) since the 2018 census, and a decrease of 21 people (−15.2%) since the 2013 census. There were 66 males and 54 females in 39 dwellings. 2.6% of people identified as LGBTIQ+. The median age was 39.6 years (compared with 38.1 years nationally). There were 15 people (12.8%) aged under 15 years, 27 (23.1%) aged 15 to 29, 63 (53.8%) aged 30 to 64, and 15 (12.8%) aged 65 or older.

People could identify as more than one ethnicity. The results were 56.4% European (Pākehā), 7.7% Māori, 15.4% Pasifika, and 25.6% Asian. English was spoken by 97.4%, and other languages by 23.1%. The percentage of people born overseas was 38.5, compared with 28.8% nationally.

Religious affiliations were 41.0% Christian, and 5.1% Hindu. People who answered that they had no religion were 46.2%, and 7.7% of people did not answer the census question.

Of those at least 15 years old, 21 (20.6%) people had a bachelor's or higher degree, 45 (44.1%) had a post-high school certificate or diploma, and 39 (38.2%) people exclusively held high school qualifications. The median income was $50,700, compared with $41,500 nationally. 9 people (8.8%) earned over $100,000 compared to 12.1% nationally. The employment status of those at least 15 was that 60 (58.8%) people were employed full-time, 12 (11.8%) were part-time, and 3 (2.9%) were unemployed.

=== Tuakau Rural statistical area ===
Tuakau Rural statistical area, which surrounds but does not include Tuakau, covers 43.04 km^{2} (16.62 sq mi) and had an estimated population of 1,630 as of June 2025, with a population density of 38 people per km^{2}.

Historical population for Tuakau Rural
Year	Pop.	±% p.a.
2006	1,335	—
2013	1,371	+0.38%
2018	1,491	+1.69%
2023	1,581	+1.18%
The 2006 population is for a larger area of 46.00 km^{2}. Source:

Tuakau Rural had a population of 1,581 in the 2023 New Zealand census, an increase of 90 people (6.0%) since the 2018 census, and an increase of 210 people (15.3%) since the 2013 census. There were 822 males, 756 females and 3 people of other genders in 528 dwellings. 1.9% of people identified as LGBTIQ+. The median age was 44.3 years (compared with 38.1 years nationally). There were 231 people (14.6%) aged under 15 years, 315 (19.9%) aged 15 to 29, 750 (47.4%) aged 30 to 64, and 285 (18.0%) aged 65 or older.

People could identify as more than one ethnicity. The results were 79.9% European (Pākehā); 15.2% Māori; 5.7% Pasifika; 12.7% Asian; 0.6% Middle Eastern, Latin American and African New Zealanders (MELAA); and 2.8% other, which includes people giving their ethnicity as "New Zealander". English was spoken by 96.2%, Māori language by 2.7%, Samoan by 1.1%, and other languages by 13.9%. No language could be spoken by 1.5% (e.g. too young to talk). New Zealand Sign Language was known by 0.4%. The percentage of people born overseas was 22.4, compared with 28.8% nationally.

Religious affiliations were 34.3% Christian, 1.7% Hindu, 0.4% Islam, 0.6% Māori religious beliefs, 0.4% Buddhist, 0.4% New Age, and 1.3% other religions. People who answered that they had no religion were 53.5%, and 7.4% of people did not answer the census question.

Of those at least 15 years old, 231 (17.1%) people had a bachelor's or higher degree, 759 (56.2%) had a post-high school certificate or diploma, and 357 (26.4%) people exclusively held high school qualifications. The median income was $44,900, compared with $41,500 nationally. 204 people (15.1%) earned over $100,000 compared to 12.1% nationally. The employment status of those at least 15 was that 756 (56.0%) people were employed full-time, 219 (16.2%) were part-time, and 24 (1.8%) were unemployed.

== Education ==
Harrisville School is a co-educational state primary school covering years 1 to 6, with a roll of 203 as of July 2026. The school opened in 1877. In the 2019 Education Review Office report, 38% of the students were Māori.
