= Edward McKenna =

Recipient of the Victoria Cross (1827–1908)

Edward McKenna VC
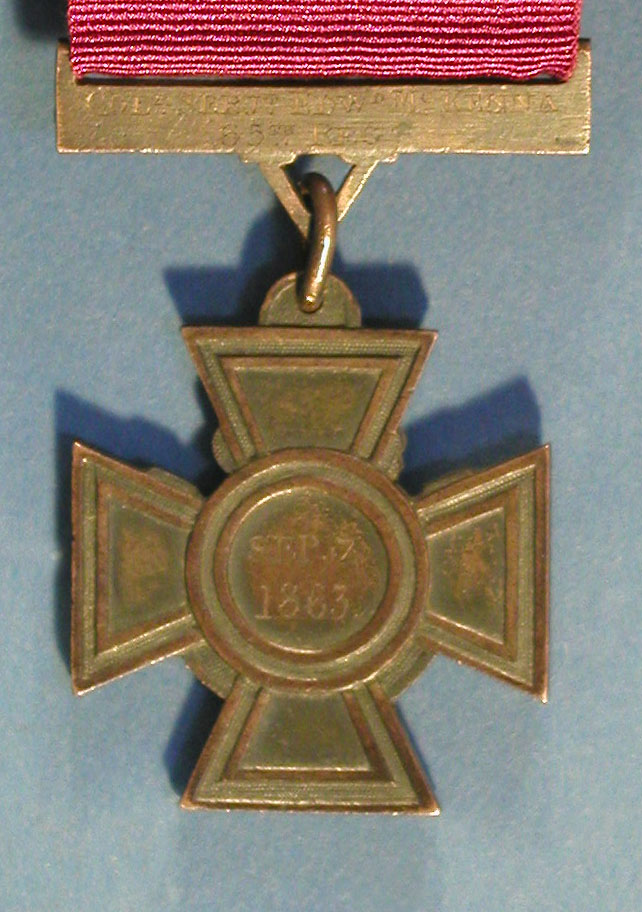
- Reverse of Edward McKenna's Victoria Cross; Auckland War Memorial Museum
- Born: 15 February 1827; Leeds, West Yorkshire, England
- Died: 8 June 1908 (aged 81); Palmerston North, New Zealand
- Burial place: Terrace End Cemetery, Palmerston North
- Military career
- Allegiance: United Kingdom
- Branch: (United Kingdom of Great Britain and Ireland) British Army
- Rank: Ensign
- Unit: 65th Regiment of Foot
- Conflicts: New Zealand Wars; Invasion of Waikato
- Awards: Victoria Cross; New Zealand War Medal

Edward McKenna VC (15 February 1827 – 8 June 1908) was a British Army soldier and a recipient of the Victoria Cross, the highest award for gallantry in the face of the enemy that can be awarded to British and Commonwealth forces.

== Victoria Cross ==
McKenna was 36 years old, and a colour sergeant in the 65th Regiment of Foot (later the 1st Bn, York and Lancaster Regiment) during the Invasion of Waikato, when the following deed took place for which he was awarded the VC:

For gallant conduct at the engagement near Cameron-town, New Zealand, on the 7th of September, 1863, after both his Officers, Captain Swift and Lieutenant Butler, had been shot, in charging through the position of an enemy heavily outnumbering him, and drawing off his small force, consisting of two Serjeants, one bugler, and thirty-five men, through a broken and rugged country, with the loss of but one man killed, and another missing. Lieutenant-General Cameron, C.B., Commanding Her Majesty's Forces in that colony, reports that, in Colour-Serjeant MacKenna, the detachment found a Commander whose coolness, intrepidity, and judgment, justified the confidence placed in him by the soldiers brought so suddenly under his command.

== Later career and life ==
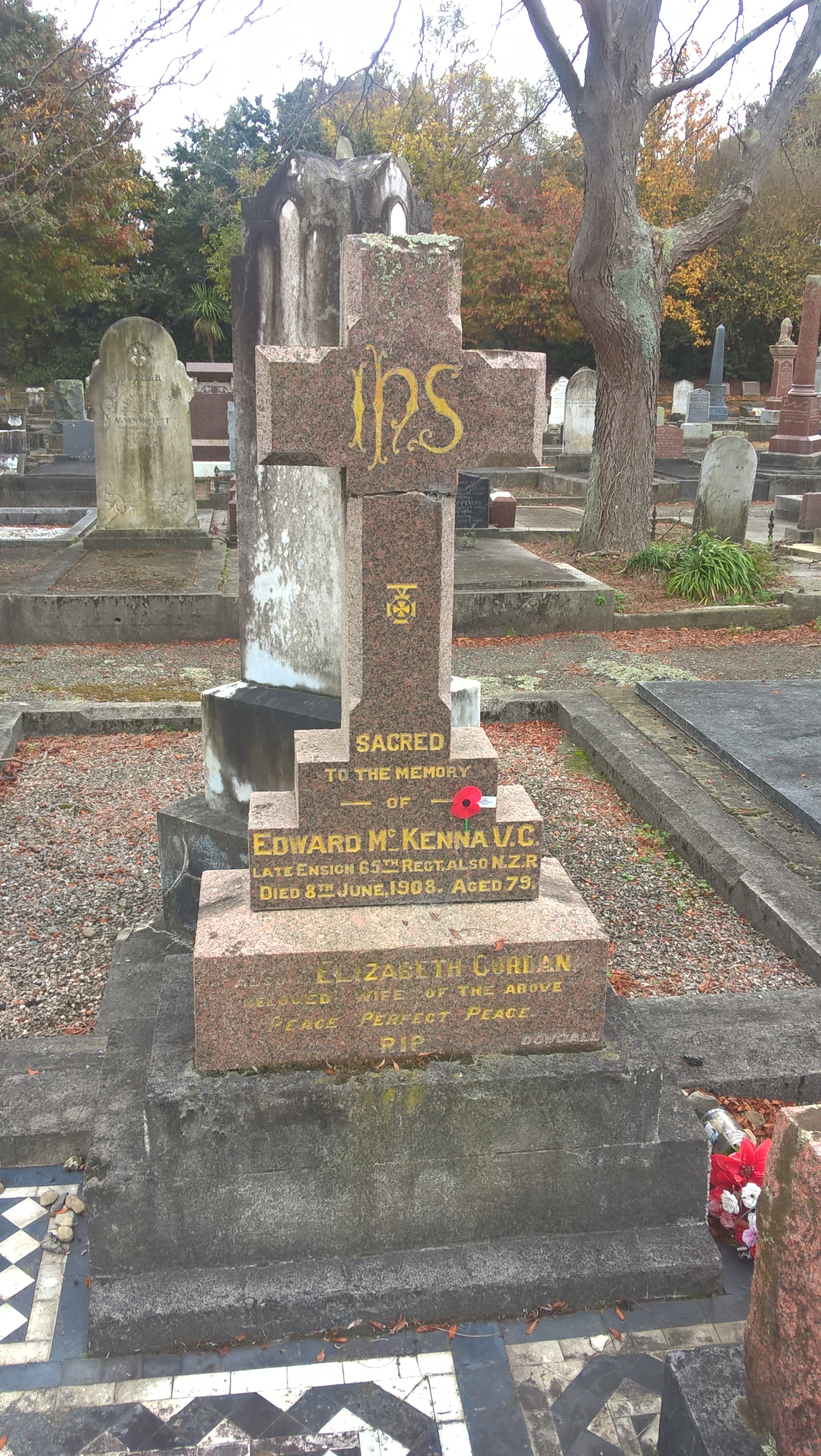
McKenna's headstone in Terrace End Cemetery, Palmerston North.

For this deed he was also commissioned with the rank of ensign. In October 1865 his regiment was recalled to England, but Edward had grown attached to the colony, he sold his commission and remained. He joined the New Zealand Railways as a clerk and soon rose to be Station Master at Kaiapoi, Ashburton, Invercargill, Gore, Greatford, Halcombe and in the early 1880s Palmerston North. He eventually retired to Palmerston North where he later died. He is buried at Terrace End Cemetery, Palmerston North in Presbyterian Block II, plot 65.

== The medal ==
His Medal is displayed in the Auckland War Memorial Museum. The archives also contain his gun and uniform.
