= Queen's Redoubt =

Military fort in Pōkeno, New Zealand

- Pōkeno, New Zealand
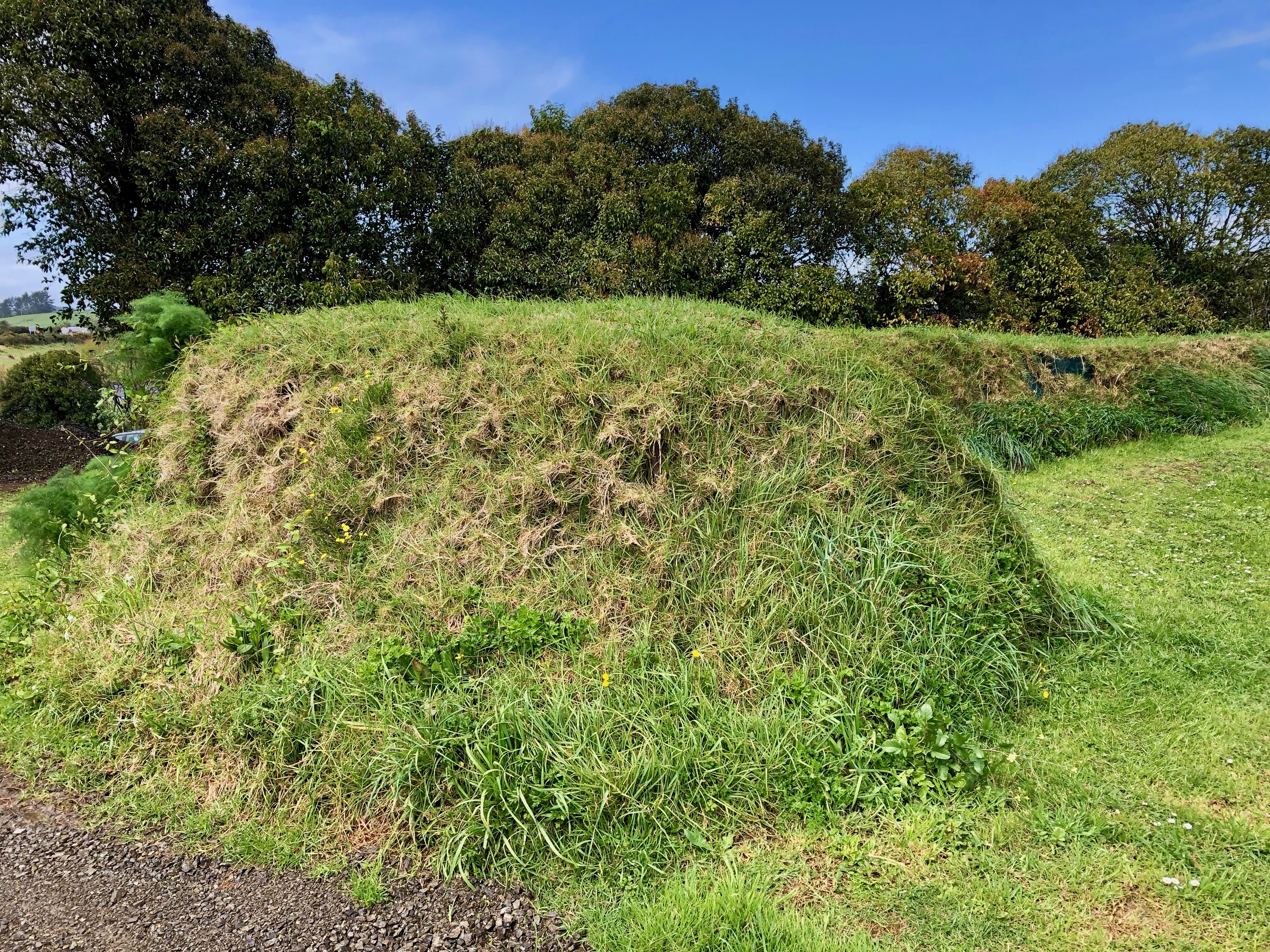
- A view of the ramparts of the Queen's Redoubt as they appeared in 2019

Site information
- Type: Redoubt
- Open to the public: Yes

Location
- Coordinates: 37°14′47″S 175°01′34″E

Site history
- Built: June 1862
- Materials: Earthworks
- Battles/wars: New Zealand Wars: Invasion of the Waikato

Queen's Redoubt is a fortification of the New Zealand Wars, located at Pōkeno, New Zealand. It was built to protect the southern end of a major supply route to Auckland. It subsequently served as the main British base during the early stages of the Invasion of the Waikato. Erected in June 1862, it was garrisoned until 1866 at which time it was abandoned. The majority of the site is now owned by the Queen's Redoubt Trust, which has developed it as a visitor attraction.

== History ==
Beginning in 1861, the British began construction of the Great South Road, a thoroughfare running south from Auckland to the Waikato River. The following year, Governor George Grey ordered the construction of a fortification to protect the southern end of the road. The commander of the British forces in New Zealand, General Duncan Cameron, selected a suitable site near the Māori kaianga (village) of Pōkeno in May. It was only 1.5 kilometres (0.93 mi) north of the Mangatāwhiri River, which demarcated the boundary between what was deemed to be colonialist land and that of the Māori Kīngitanga (Māori King movement), which resisted the British forces.

Construction of Queen's Redoubt, the namesake of which believed to be Queen Victoria, the reigning monarch of the British Empire, commenced in June. Men of the 14th, 65th and 70th Regiments were involved in its building, and the fortification, the second largest in size to be built by the British during the New Zealand Wars, was completed by the end of the year. A road leading from the site to Mangatawhiri River was also built, this being completed by March 1863. A telegraph line to Albert Barracks, in Auckland, was installed although it did not reach the redoubt until after the Invasion of the Waikato had commenced.

Queen's Redoubt was garrisoned by 450 soldiers and from here would mount patrols along the Great South Road. Grey had intended the redoubt to be used as a launch pad for the Invasion of the Waikato, and in the lead-up to this, around 2,000 men were camped outside of the redoubt. The invasion commenced on 12 July and from this time up until November 1863, Cameron had his headquarters here. Troops would camp at the site as they made their way to the front-lines. The redoubt was never attacked directly by the Kīngites although patrols mounted by the garrison were subject to attempted skirmishes; on these occasions, the British would retreat to the redoubt.

A military hospital, able to handle 100 men, was established at the site to deal with the expected casualties from the campaign in the Waikato. Several wounded from the Battle of Rangiriri were treated at the hospital. The hospital effectively ceased operations in October 1864, with only sufficient personnel being retained to care for the garrison.

In October 1865, the military presence at the redoubt had been reduced to that required for care and maintenance and a year later the site was abandoned altogether. The buildings on site were sold in 1867 and relocated and although the ramparts were left intact, over time they deteriorated while the ditches were filled in. The land was subsequently sold off, and portions used for farming.

== Description ==
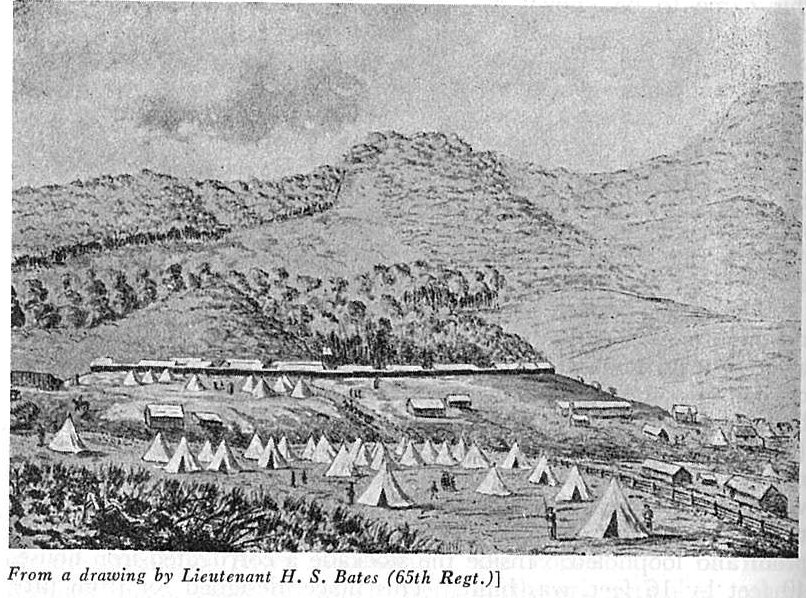
A contemporary depiction of Queen's Redoubt, seen in the mid-distance with a soldier's camp in the foreground

A redoubt is a type of fortification which, since it did not require timber elements, could be constructed relatively quickly by troops in the field. Usually taking a square or rectangular plan form, they were prepared by excavating a ditch to a depth of around 1.8 metres (5.9 ft) to define the perimeter of the redoubt. The dug out earth was piled up on the inner side of the ditch to form a parapet, the reverse side being profiled to include a firing step. The overall height of the parapet, from the base of the ditch to its top, would be around 4.2 metres (14 ft).

Queen's Redoubt has a square plan, with sides around 90 metres (300 ft) in length and an overall size of 8281 m^{2} (2.05 acres). The western side of the redoubt was next to the Great South Road. Bastions were provided to the northwest and southeast corners, which provided cover along all sides of the redoubt. There is some evidence to suggest the bastions included blockhouses but these may have been removed by 1864. The ditches in front of the ramparts were slightly deeper than was typical, about 2.4 metres (7.9 ft); at their base, they were 2.4 m wide while at the top, had a width of 4.8 metres (16 ft).

At the centre of the redoubt was a parade ground and arranged around this was some 27 buildings, mainly barracks for the garrison but also including a storehouse and the hospital. The main entrances to the redoubt were provided centrally to the opposing west and east walls, the former likely serving as the main access point given its proximity to the Great South Road. Some archeological evidence suggests a metaled track was provided for carts and wagons entering the redoubt.

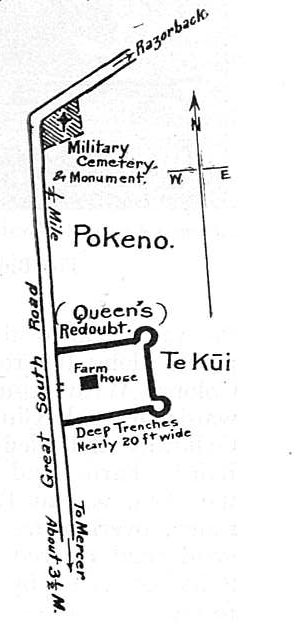
A plan of Queen's Redoubt relative to Pokeno, as it appeared in 1922

A major portion of what was Queen's Redoubt was acquired by the Queen's Redoubt Trust in 2003. However, the northern side of the redoubt's earthworks form the backyards of some dwellings on Selby Street, in the Pōkeno township, and remain in private ownership. With a view to developing the site as a visitor attraction, the south eastern portions of the redoubt were restored over a period of years. An education centre for the New Zealand Wars and the role of Queen's Redoubt played in the conflict was built; this was completed in 2015.
