= Allahganj =

Hathras
- Town
- Location in Uttar Pradesh, India
- Coordinates: 27.8°N 78.85°E
- Country: India
- State: Uttar Pradesh
- District: Shahjahanpur

Government
  - Type: Nagar Panchayat
- Elevation: 176 m (577 ft)

Population (2021)
  - Total: Unknown

Languages
  - Official: Hindi
- Time zone: UTC+5:30 (IST)
- PIN: 242220
- Telephone code: 05842
- Vehicle registration: UP- 27

Allahganj is a town and a nagar panchayat in Shahjahanpur district in the state of Uttar Pradesh, India.

== Transportation ==
The nearest railway station is at Farrukhabad. The nearest airport is at Bareilly.

== Education ==
Major Schools/Colleges:

- Swami Vivekanand Inter College
- NGS Degree College
- Ramnath Mishra High School
- Th.AS Inter College
- RK Private ITI Hullapur Allahganj

== Demographics ==
- Male: 15,363
- Female: 10,032
- Total Population: 25,395
- total votes: 13,995

Religions in Allahganj
Religion	Percent
Hindus	58%
Muslims	41%
Jains	0.5%
Others†	0.5%
Distribution of religions †Includes Sikhs (0.2%), Buddhists (<0.2%).

== Culture ==
=== Festivals ===
Every year, in September or October during the festival of Navratri, many associations and organisations hold a Ramlila event which has been conducted for over 50 years.

Eid ul-Fitr is the holy festival of Ramadan consists of month-long fasting. It is believed that fasting makes a man give up his vices which bring him closer to Allah. Muslims form an essential part of cultural strata in India hence Eid is celebrated with holy fasting and offering prayers. It ends with joyful feasting.

Rakshabandhan is a festival that commemorates the bond between a brother and his sister. Sisters tie Rakhi on their brothers' wrist to protect them against any evil influences. The brothers bring gifts for their sisters and promise the necessary protection for a lifetime. The festival is widely celebrated in every state of India. It strengthens the love between the two.

Janmashtami is the annual Hindu festival celebrates the birth of Lord Krishna.

Diwali is when the country celebrates the return of Lord Rama to Ayodhya after an exile of 14 years in the form of lighting diyas, drawing rangolis, decorating houses, wearing new clothes, distributing gifts and burning crackers.
