= Tuakau =

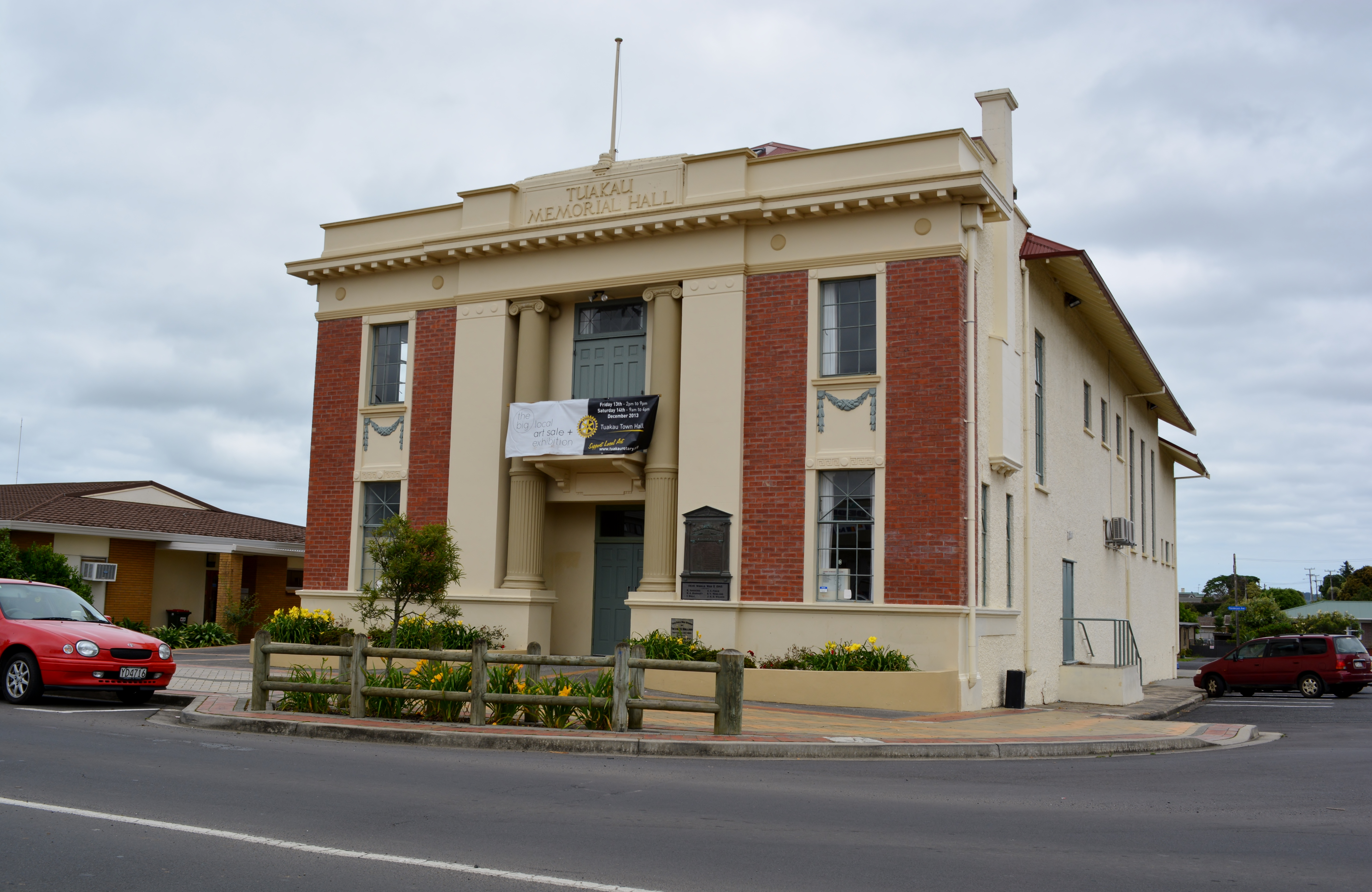
- Tuakau Memorial Hall
- Interactive map of Tuakau
- Coordinates: 37°16′S 174°57′E
- Country: New Zealand
- Region: Waikato
- District: Waikato District
- Wards: Tuakau-Pōkeno General Ward; Tai Raro Takiwaa Maaori Ward
- Community: Onewhero-Tuakau Community
- Electorates: Port Waikato; Hauraki-Waikato (Māori)

Government
  - Territorial Authority: Waikato District Council
  - Regional council: Waikato Regional Council
  - Mayor of Waikato: Aksel Bech
  - Port Waikato MP: Andrew Bayly
  - Hauraki-Waikato MP: Hana-Rawhiti Maipi-Clarke

Area
  - Total: 8.31 km^{2} (3.21 sq mi)

Population (June 2025)
  - Total: 6,090
  - Density: 733/km^{2} (1,900/sq mi)
- Postcode(s): 2121

Tuakau (Māori: Tūākau) is a town in the Waikato region at the foot of the Bombay Hills, formerly part of the Franklin District until 2010, when it became part of Waikato District in the North Island of New Zealand. The town serves to support local farming, and is the residence of many employees of New Zealand Steel at Glenbrook.

== Toponymy ==
The place name is believed to be a geographical reference to the high bluff nearby that offers views down the Waikato river. In Māori the word tū can mean 'to stand' and ākau 'river bank'.

== History and culture ==
=== Pre-European history ===
The area was first used as a trading centre for passing waka that would transport goods up and down the Waikato River.

=== European settlement ===
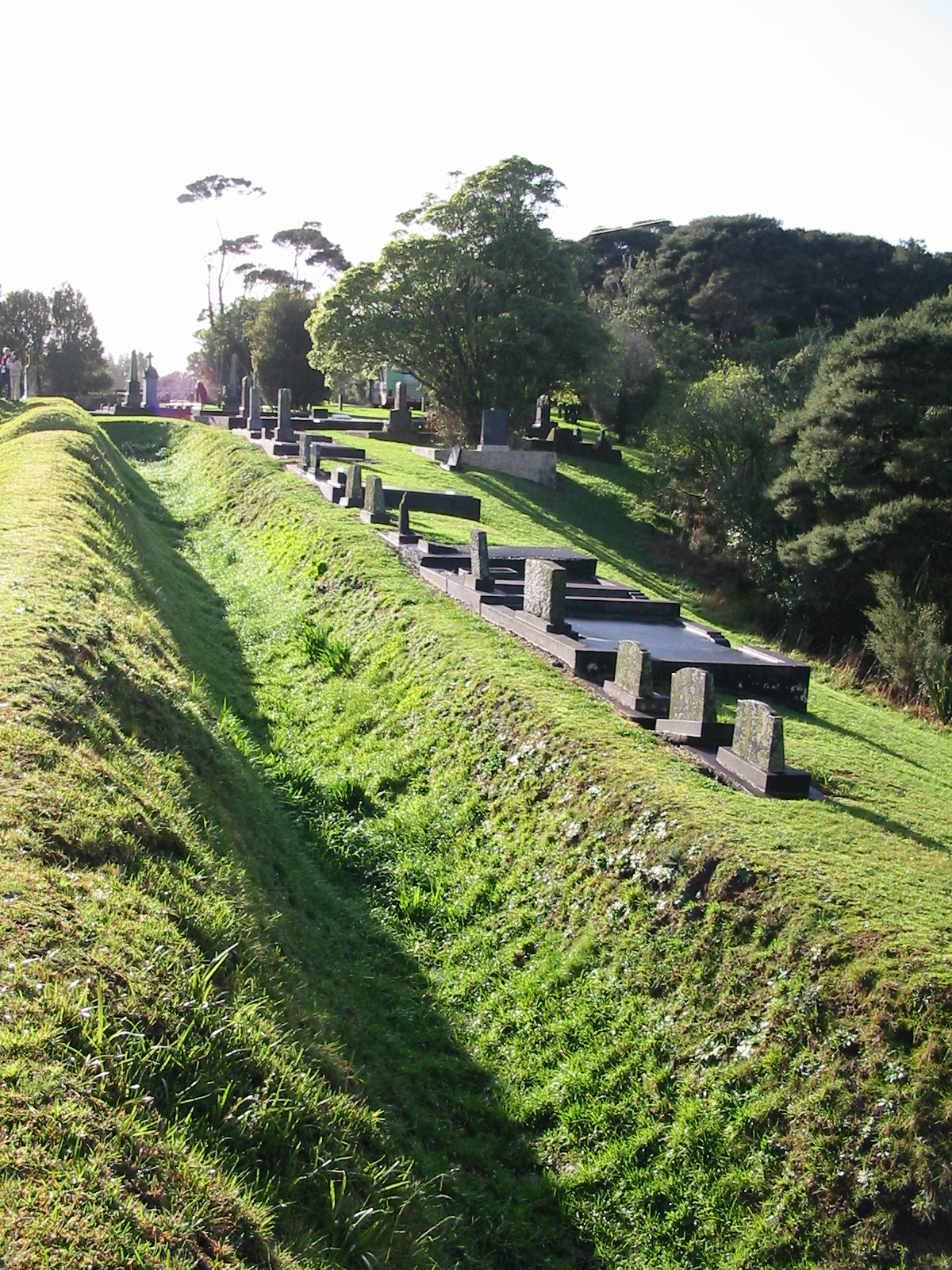
Alexandra Redoubt, Tuakau

A flax mill was built in 1855.

In 1863 the government invaded the Waikato in response to Kingite Māori refusing to swear an oath of loyalty to the Queen. Imperial troops were stationed by the New Zealand Government in Tuakau. To help defend the area, the Alexandra Redoubt was built as a defensive fort on the bluff near the river. The existing town, which was originally intended to be built closer to the Waikato River, was subsequently built in an area 2 km further inland.

The railway from Auckland reached Tuakau in 1875, when the Tuakau Railway Station was opened.

=== Recent history ===
By 1914 the people of Tuakau had formed their own town district which went on to achieve borough status on 1 January 1955. During its 44 years as a borough, Tuakau had seven mayors:

	Name	Term
1	E.A. Clayton	1955–1959
2	T.F. Hutchinson	1959–1961
3	A.H. Lockyer	1961–1962
4	G.A. McGuire	1962–1971
5	E.B. Wild	1971–1980
6	T.N. Tuhimata	1980–1983
7	H.B. Armitage	1983–1989

Amalgamations since 1989 has seen it first become part of the Franklin District governed by a district council and then in 2010 with border changes saw it became part of Waikato district when present-day Auckland Council boundaries were created.

=== Marae ===
Tuakau has two marae (Maori sacred or communal place), affiliated with the hapū (Māori sub-tribe or clan) of Waikato Tainui (a tribal confederation based in the Waikato Region). Ngā Tai e Rua Marae and its Ngā Tai e Rua meeting house are a meeting place Ngāti Āmaru, Ngāti Koheriki and Ngāti Tiipa. Tauranganui Marae and its Rangiwahitu meeting house are a meeting place for Ngāti Āmaru Ngati Rangiwahitu, Ngati Kaiaua and Ngāti Tiipa.

== Bridges ==
=== Tuakau Bridge ===
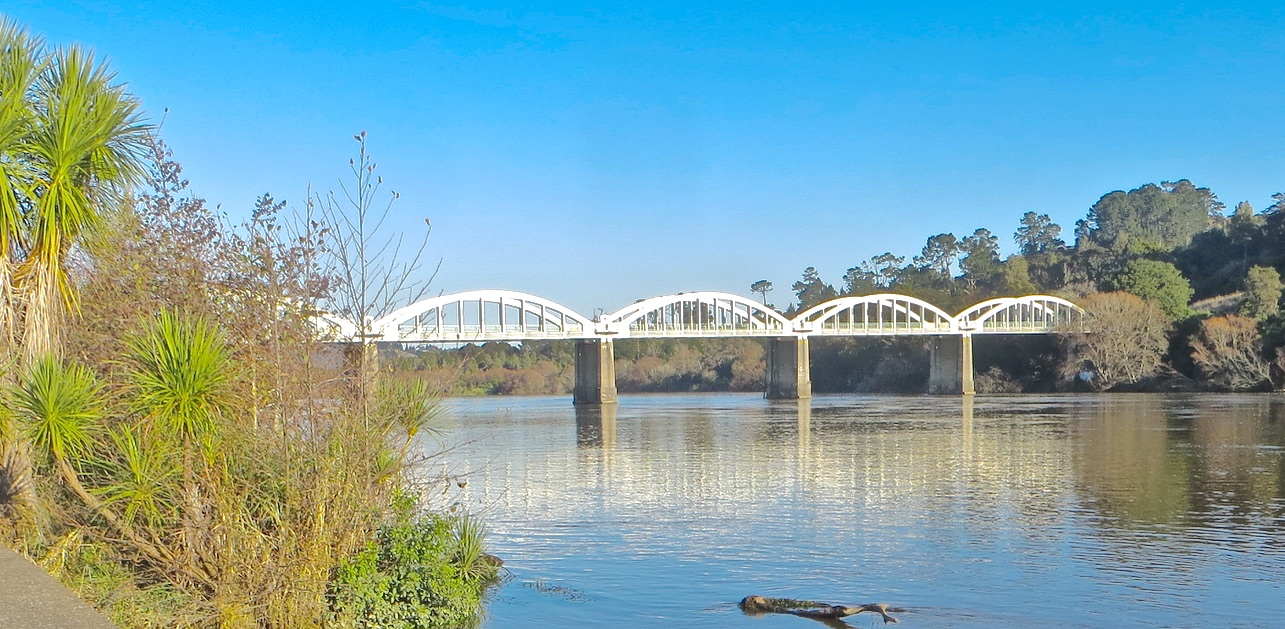
1933 Tuakau Bridge

The town's 'Tuakau Bridge' replaced the need for a ferry from November 1902. A span of the original wooden bridge collapsed on 23 August 1929 and was replaced by the current £24,000 ($2.9m at 2015 prices), 750 ft (230 m) bridge from 22 June 1933, designed by Jones & Adams, who also built Horotiu (1921), Te Aroha (1926), Ngamuwahine River (1930) and Fairfield bridges (1937). It was once part of State Highway 22.

=== Gas pipeline aerial crossing ===
About 3 km (1.9 mi) upstream from Tuakau Bridge, at the end of Brown Rd, the river is crossed by the First Gas 400-line gas transmission pipe, which supplies gas from the Maui gas pipeline at Rotowaro to Auckland and Northland. The 350 mm (14 in) pipe crosses on a 376 m (411 yd), 11 pier, truss bridge, 14 m (46 ft) above the water, which was built in 1980 and renovated in 2007.

== Demographics ==
Stats NZ describes Tuakau as a small urban area. It covers 8.31 km^{2} (3.21 sq mi) and had an estimated population of 6,090 as of June 2025, with a population density of 733 people per km^{2}.

Historical population
Year	Pop.	±% p.a.
2006	3,609	—
2013	4,359	+2.73%
2018	5,103	+3.20%
2023	5,736	+2.37%
The 2006 population is for a smaller area of 5.35 km^{2}. Source:

Tuakau had a population of 5,736 in the 2023 New Zealand census, an increase of 633 people (12.4%) since the 2018 census, and an increase of 1,377 people (31.6%) since the 2013 census. There were 2,784 males, 2,934 females and 21 people of other genders in 1,884 dwellings. 2.9% of people identified as LGBTIQ+. The median age was 33.7 years (compared with 38.1 years nationally). There were 1,380 people (24.1%) aged under 15 years, 1,122 (19.6%) aged 15 to 29, 2,547 (44.4%) aged 30 to 64, and 693 (12.1%) aged 65 or older.

People could identify as more than one ethnicity. The results were 64.3% European (Pākehā); 31.6% Māori; 11.0% Pasifika; 11.7% Asian; 1.3% Middle Eastern, Latin American and African New Zealanders (MELAA); and 2.8% other, which includes people giving their ethnicity as "New Zealander". English was spoken by 95.4%, Māori language by 7.2%, Samoan by 0.8%, and other languages by 12.4%. No language could be spoken by 2.8% (e.g. too young to talk). New Zealand Sign Language was known by 0.5%. The percentage of people born overseas was 21.2, compared with 28.8% nationally.

Religious affiliations were 29.3% Christian, 2.4% Hindu, 0.7% Islam, 1.9% Māori religious beliefs, 0.7% Buddhist, 0.5% New Age, 0.1% Jewish, and 2.5% other religions. People who answered that they had no religion were 54.9%, and 7.4% of people did not answer the census question.

Of those at least 15 years old, 639 (14.7%) people had a bachelor's or higher degree, 2,439 (56.0%) had a post-high school certificate or diploma, and 1,284 (29.5%) people exclusively held high school qualifications. The median income was $46,000, compared with $41,500 nationally. 399 people (9.2%) earned over $100,000 compared to 12.1% nationally. The employment status of those at least 15 was that 2,457 (56.4%) people were employed full-time, 528 (12.1%) were part-time, and 126 (2.9%) were unemployed.

Individual statistical areas
Name	Area (km^{2})	Population	Density (per km^{2})	Dwellings	Median age	Median income
Tuakau North	5.39	3,528	655	1,164	33.6 years	$46,200
Tuakau South	2.91	2,211	760	723	33.7 years	$45,500
New Zealand					38.1 years	$41,500

== Public Sporting Facilities ==
Tuakau has sporting facilities available to the public. The Dr John Lightbody Reserve sporting complex on George Street features a swimming pool, sports fields, tennis courts, netball courts and a skate park. The Tuakau Centennial Swimming Pool is open to the public, is used for swimming lessons and is used by Tuakau School and Tuakau College for sports days. The sports fields are used for athletics, and team sports including rugby, touch rugby, soccer. The sports fields have change rooms and a rugby club rooms. The following sports clubs use or are based in the complex: Tuakau Rugby Football Club, Tuakau Soccer Club. The reserve has public toilets.

== Education ==
The main primary school is Tuakau School, where Sir Edmund Hillary and Hugh Poland were educated. It is a co-educational state primary school, with a roll of 249 as of July 2026. The school first opened in 1870, and moved to its current location in 1922.

Harrisville School is located to the north, at Harrisville.

Tuakau College is the district's state secondary school, with a roll of 1,016. The college opened in 1974.
