= Waikato Raupatu Claims Settlement Act 1995 =

Act of New Zealand Parliament

New Zealand Parliament
- Long title: An Act— (a) to record the apology given by the Crown to Waikato in the deed of settlement signed on 22 May 1995 by both representatives of the Crown and representatives of Waikato, being an apology by the Crown for, among other things, sending its forces across the Mangatawhiri river in July 1863, unfairly labelling Waikato as rebels, and subsequently confiscating their land; and (b) to give effect to certain provisions of that deed of settlement, being a deed that settles the Raupatu claims
- Royal assent: 3 November 1995

Legislative history
- Passed: 1995
- Status: Current legislation

The Waikato Raupatu Claims Settlement Act 1995 is an act of the New Zealand Parliament passed into law in 1995. It was the first act implementing a major historical Treaty of Waitangi settlement since the Treaty of Waitangi Act 1975 was amended in 1985 to allow the Waitangi Tribunal to investigate historic breaches of the treaty.

== Background ==
The act was the culmination of years of negotiations between Waikato Tainui and the New Zealand Government. Originally, Waikato-Tainui had made a claim by way of the Waitangi Tribunal, but in 1991 direct negotiations began between the tribe and the government of Prime Minister Jim Bolger.

In 1994, a Heads of Agreement was signed.

The Deed of Settlement was signed on 22 May 1995 by Prime Minister Jim Bolger and Dame Te Atairangikaahu at Turangawaewae Marae. The total settlement package was $170m.

== Assent ==
Royal Assent for the bill was granted by Queen Elizabeth II on 3 November 1995 in a ceremony at Government House in Wellington. Dame Te Atairangikaahu and other dignitaries also attended the ceremony. This was unusual and originally, Waikato Tainui wanted both Queen Elizabeth and Dame Te Atairangikaahu (the Māori Queen) to sign the apology. Buckingham Palace objected to this as it could have had implications for the other realms where the Queen is head of state, and indigenous peoples had claims against the Crown.

Instead, it was agreed that the Queen would personally grant assent to the legislation (which includes the Crown's apology) as this would be on her ministers' advice.

== See also ==
- New Zealand land confiscations
- Waikato-Maniapoto Maori Claims Settlement Act 1946
- Treaty of Waitangi claims and settlements
