= 65th (2nd Yorkshire, North Riding) Regiment of Foot =

- Active: 10 December 1756–1 July 1881
- Country: Kingdom of Great Britain (1756–1800); United Kingdom (1801–1881)
- Branch: British Army
- Type: Line infantry
- Size: One battalion
- Garrison/HQ: Pontefract Barracks, Yorkshire
- Nicknames: The Royal Tigers; Hickety Pips
- Colors: Facings – White
- Engagements: Seven Years' War; American War of Independence; Anglo-French War; Napoleonic Wars

The 65th (2nd Yorkshire, North Riding) Regiment of Foot was an infantry regiment of the British Army, raised in 1756 as the 2nd Battalion, 12th Regiment of Foot. Under the Childers Reforms it amalgamated with the 84th (York and Lancaster) Regiment of Foot to become the 1st Battalion, York and Lancaster Regiment in 1881.

== History ==
=== Seven Years' War ===
The formation of the regiment was prompted by the expansion of the army as a result of the commencement of the Seven Years' War. On 25 August 1756 it was ordered that a number of existing regiments should raise a second battalion; among those chosen was the 12th Regiment of Foot. The 2nd Battalion of the 12th Regiment of Foot was formed on 10 December 1756 and renumbered as the 65th Regiment of Foot on 21 April 1758. It was sent to the fever ridden West Indies to aid in the capturing of the French islands of Guadeloupe in January 1759 and Martinique in January 1762. It was also involved in the expedition to capture Havana, Cuba in June 1762. In 1764 the regiment returned to England, where it refilled its ranks.

=== American War of Independence ===
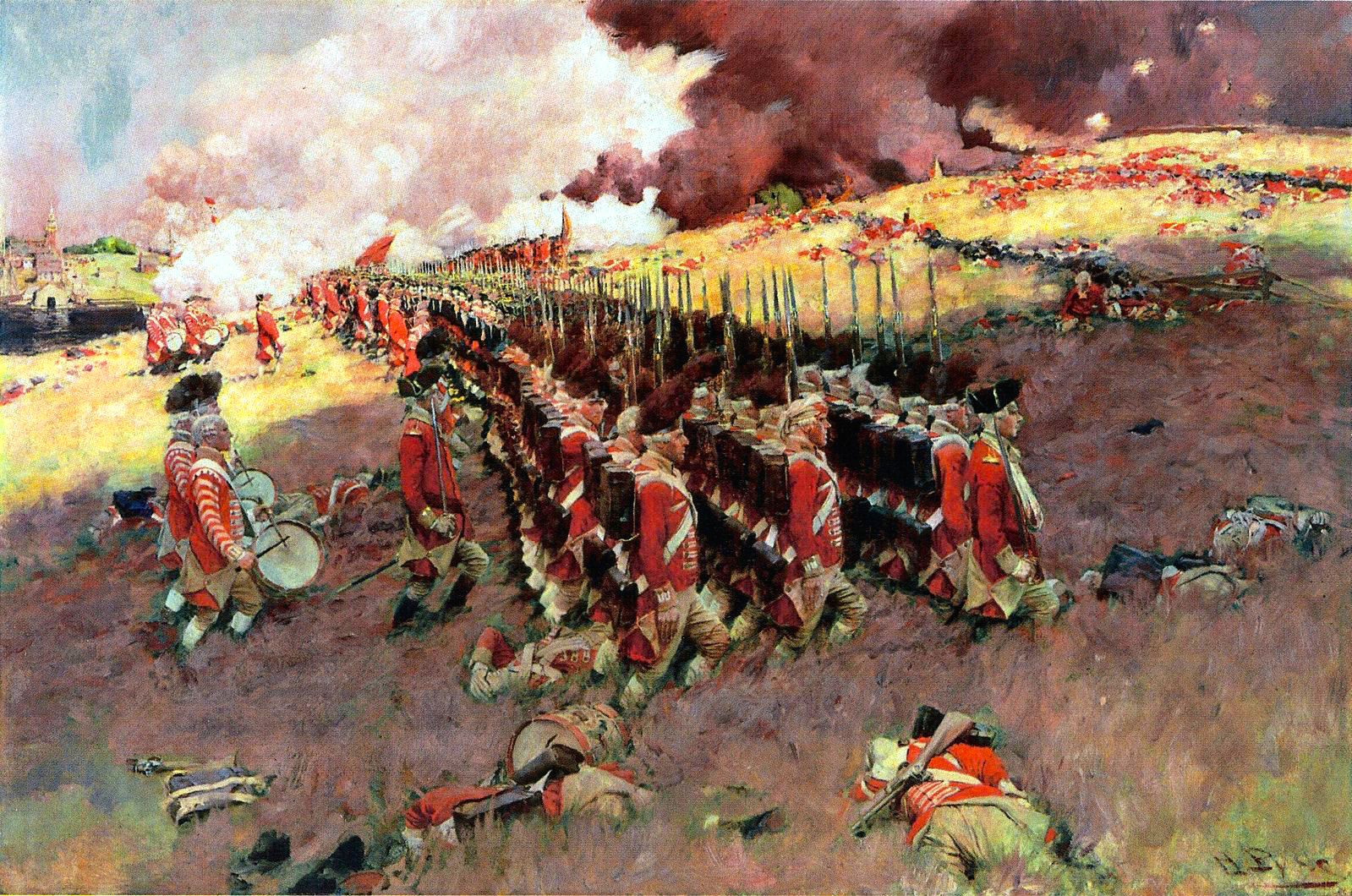
The Battle of Bunker Hill, Howard Pyle

In 1768 the regiment was shipped to Boston, Massachusetts as part of the garrison. The regiment's first action in the American War of Independence was at the Battle of Bunker Hill in June 1775 where their Grenadier and Light Companies were involved in the attack. In 1776 the remnants of the regiment were drafted into other regiments and the officers sent home to reform. In 1782 the regiment received a county title and became the 65th (The 2nd Yorkshire, North Riding) Regiment of Foot.

In 1778 the Anglo-French War broke out and the regiment was sent to the fortress at Gibraltar in 1782. After this regiment was sent to Canada in 1784 and to Nova Scotia in 1791. In 1793 the regiment was shipped back to the West Indies and took part in the attack on Santo Domingo in September 1794 and an attack on Martinique in February 1794 and an attack on Saint Lucia in April 1794.

=== French Revolutionary and Napoleonic Wars ===
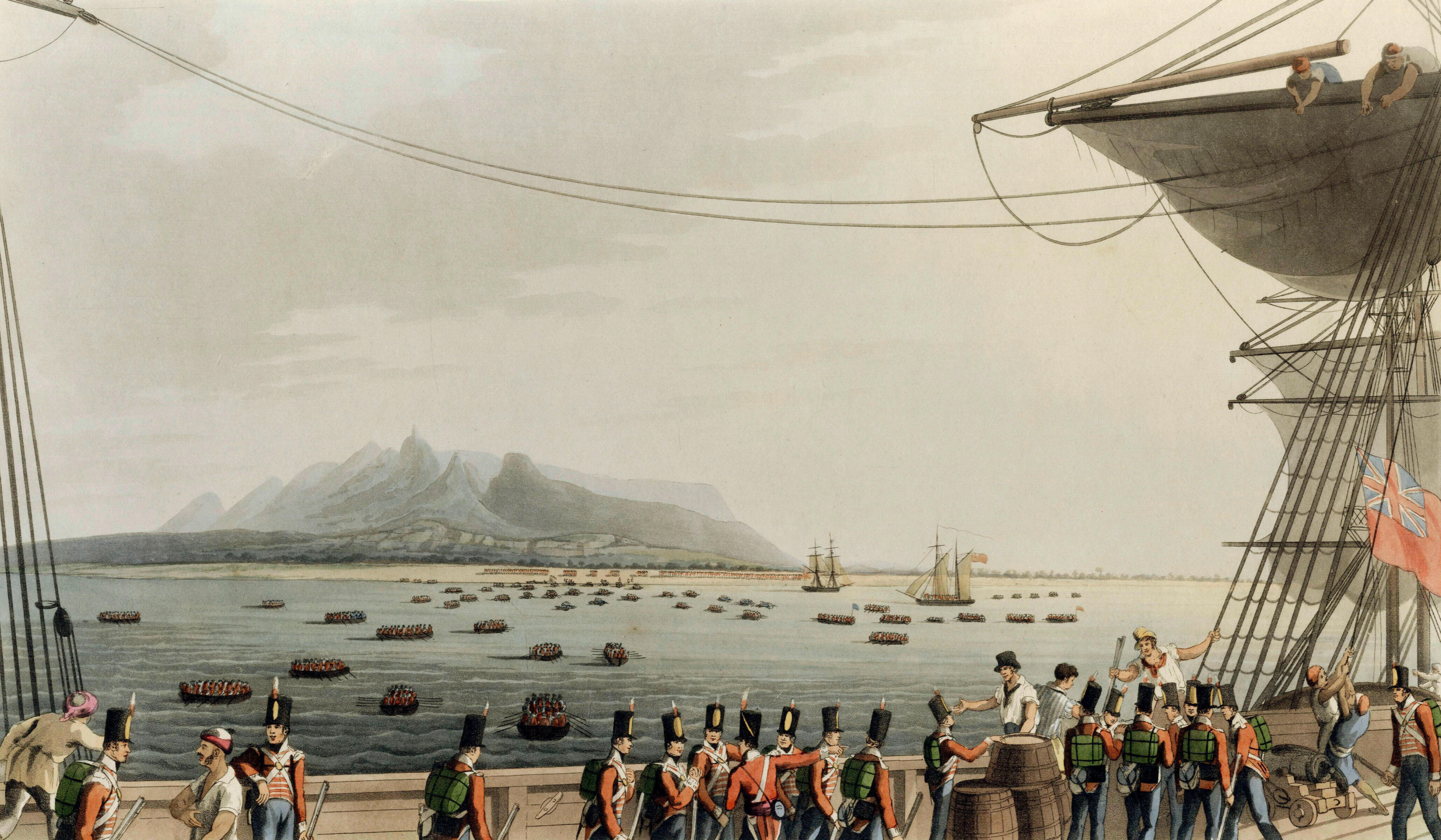
Regimental troops on a troopship during the invasion of Isle de France

The regiment was shipped to South Africa in 1800 and then on to Ceylon where it was involved in the Kandian War in 1802. It transferred to India in May 1803 and took part in the Second Anglo-Maratha War later that year. The regiment was took part in the British invasion of Isle de France in December 1810 where it took part in the capture of the island. In 1811 it returned to India: it was briefly involved in the campaign against the Oman Coast Pirates in the Persian Gulf in 1819 as well as numerous uprisings and small wars in India. The regiment returned to England in August 1822.

=== The Victorian era ===
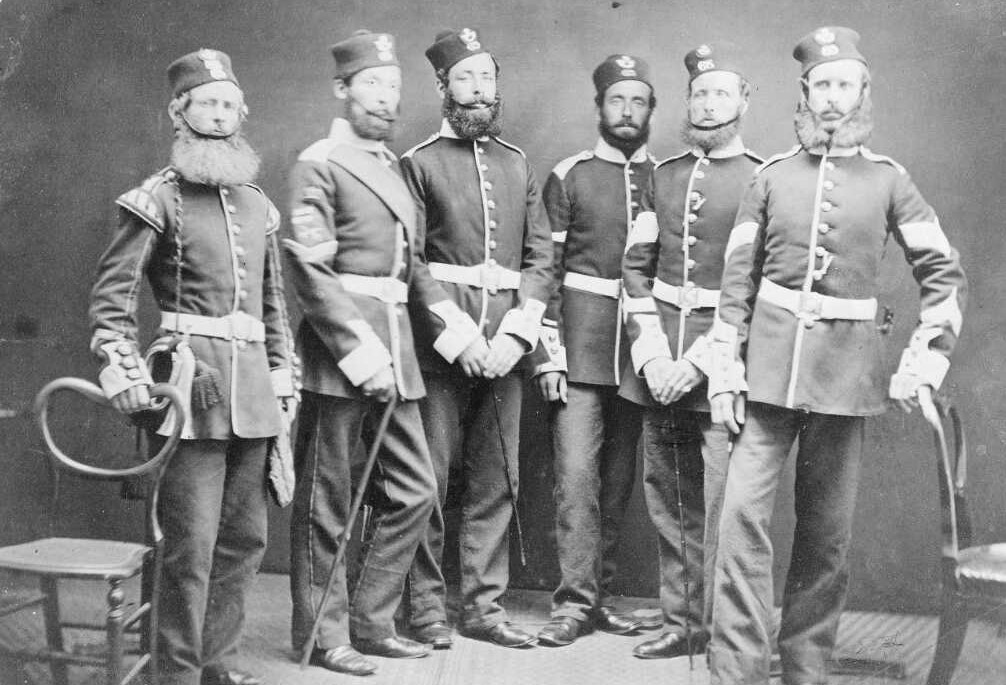
Soldiers of the 65th Regiment, ca. 1860s

In 1829, the regiment returned to the West Indies. Subsequently it carried on to Guiana in South America. It then went back to Canada to help suppress the rebellions of 1837 and 1838 before returning home in 1841. Most of the regiment embarked from Woolwich on the vessel "Java" for New South Wales on 18 May 1846. The regiment saw action in the First Taranaki War of 1860 to 1861 and in the Waikato campaign of 1863 to 1864, during which Colour-sergeant Edward McKenna and Lance Corporal John Ryan won their Victoria Crosses at Camerontown. The regiment returned home in October 1865 having become known as the "Royal Tigers" at home and as the "Hickety Pips" to the Māori due to their pronunciation of the number 65. The regiment returned to England in 1866 and then went to Ireland in 1867 to help suppress the Fenians. It then embarked at Queenstown on the vessel "Serapis" for India on 11 January 1871. The regiment was initially based in Agra. Concerns were raised in House of Commons because of the 919 troops from the regiment serving in India, 579 were under the age of 20: the Secretary of State for War agreed to rectify the issue. The regiment moved to Lucknow in January 1874, to Danapore in November 1877 and to Morar in October 1880.

As part of the Cardwell Reforms of the 1870s, where single-battalion regiments were linked together to share a single depot and recruiting district in the United Kingdom, the 65th was linked with the 84th (York and Lancaster) Regiment of Foot, and assigned to district no. 7 at Pontefract Barracks in Yorkshire. On 1 July 1881 the Childers Reforms came into effect and the regiment amalgamated with the 84th (York and Lancaster) Regiment of Foot to form the York and Lancaster Regiment. The 65th Foot became the 1st Battalion while the 84th Foot became the 2nd Battalion.

== Battle honours and distinctions ==
The regiment was awarded the following battle honours for display on the regimental colours:

- The Royal Tiger badge superscribed "India"
- Arabia (unique to this regiment)
- New Zealand 1860–61

In 1909 the successor York and Lancaster Regiment were awarded the honours Guadeloupe 1759 and Martinique 1794 for the service of the 65th Foot.

== Victoria Crosses ==
Victoria crosses awarded to men of the regiment were:

- Colour Sergeant Edward McKenna New Zealand Wars (7 September 1863)
- Private John Ryan New Zealand Wars (7 September 1863)

== Colonels ==
Colonels of the Regiment were:

=== 65th Regiment of Foot ===
- 1758–60: Lt-Gen Robert Armiger
- 1760–64: Lt-Gen George Cholmondeley, Viscount Malpas
- 1764–70: Lt-Gen Hon. Alexander Mackay
- 1770–79: Lt-Gen Edward Urmston
- 1779–83: Lt-Gen Thomas Calcraft

=== 65th (The 2nd Yorkshire, North Riding) Regiment of Foot – (1782) ===
- 1783–88: Gen Earl of Harrington
- 1788–97: Lt-Gen John Gunning
- 1797–1814: Gen Edmund Stevens
- 1814–51: F.M. Thomas Grosvenor
- 1851–55: Gen Samuel Benjamin Auchmuty
- 1855–57: Lt-Gen Henry Balneavis
- 1857–69: Gen Robert Bartlett Coles
- 1869–76: Lt-Gen Sir Robert Walpole
- 1876–81: Lt-Gen Robert Newton Phillips

== See also ==
- John Orrok

== Sources ==
- Beatson, Robert (1806). A Political Index to the Histories of Great Britain & Ireland. Longman, Hurst, Rees, and Orme.
- Leslie, N B (1974). The Succession of colonels of the British Army: from 1660 to the present day. Society for Army Historical Research.
- Phillippart, John (1815). The royal military calendar: containing the services of every general officer in the British Army, from the date of their commission.
- Raikes, George Alfred (1885). Roll of the Officers of the York and Lancaster Regiment: Containing a Complete Record of Their Services Including Dates of Commissions, &c Volume I: First Battalion, formerly 65th (2nd Yorkshire, North Riding) Regiment, from 1756 to 1884. Richard Bentley & Son.
- Sumner, Ian (2001). British Colours and Standards 1747–1881 (2) Infantry. Osprey. ISBN 9781841762012.
- Swinson, Arthur (1972). A Register of the Regiments and Corps of the British Army. London: The Archive Press. ISBN 0-85591-000-3.
- Wickes, L E (1974). Regiments of Foot. A Historical Record of all the Foot Regiments of the British Army. Reading: Osprey. ISBN 0850452201.
