= Teamster =

Worker driving draft animals or trucks

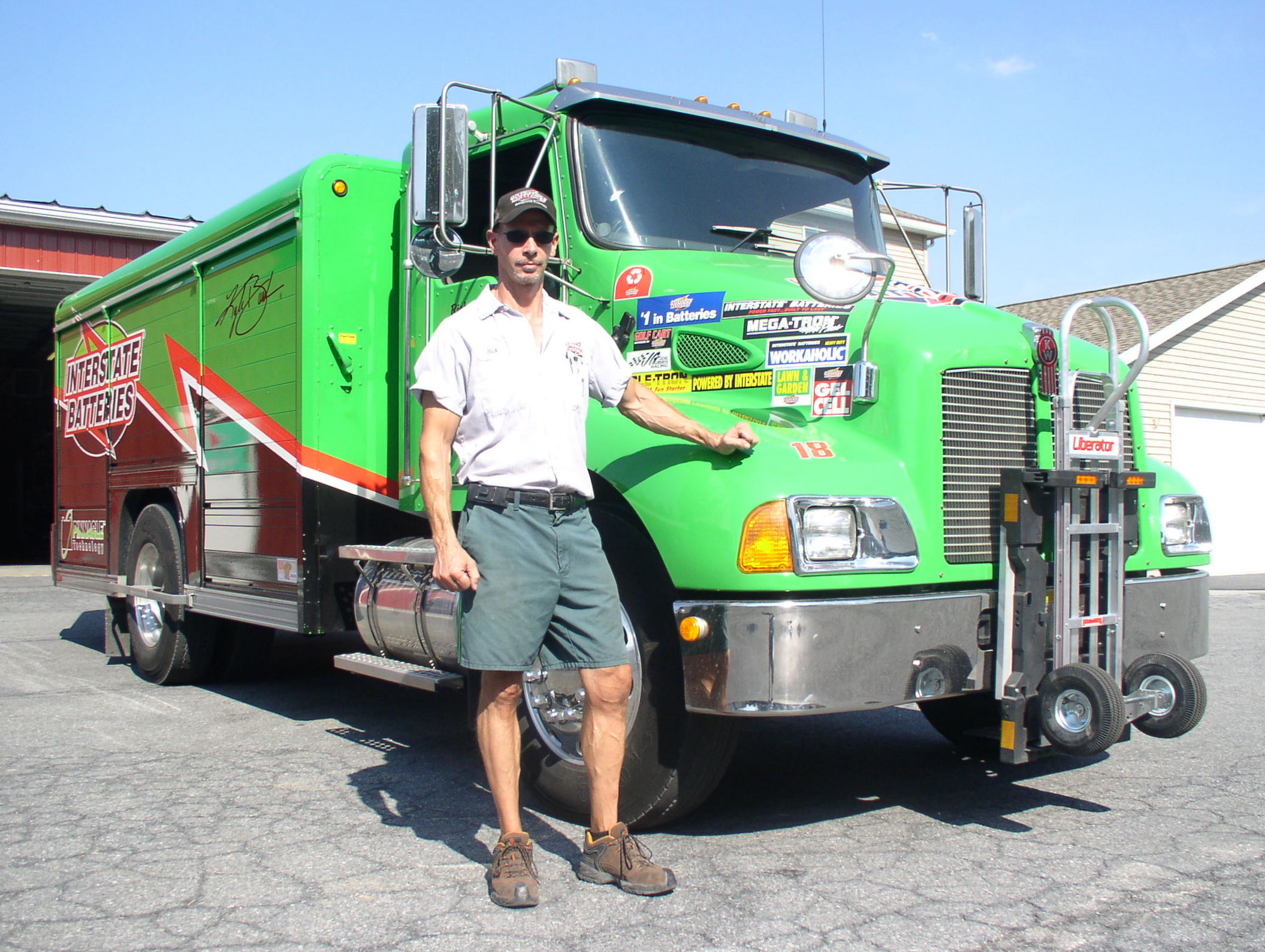
A modern teamster with his truck

A teamster is a truck driver or a member of the International Brotherhood of Teamsters, a labor union.

== Horse-drawn era ==
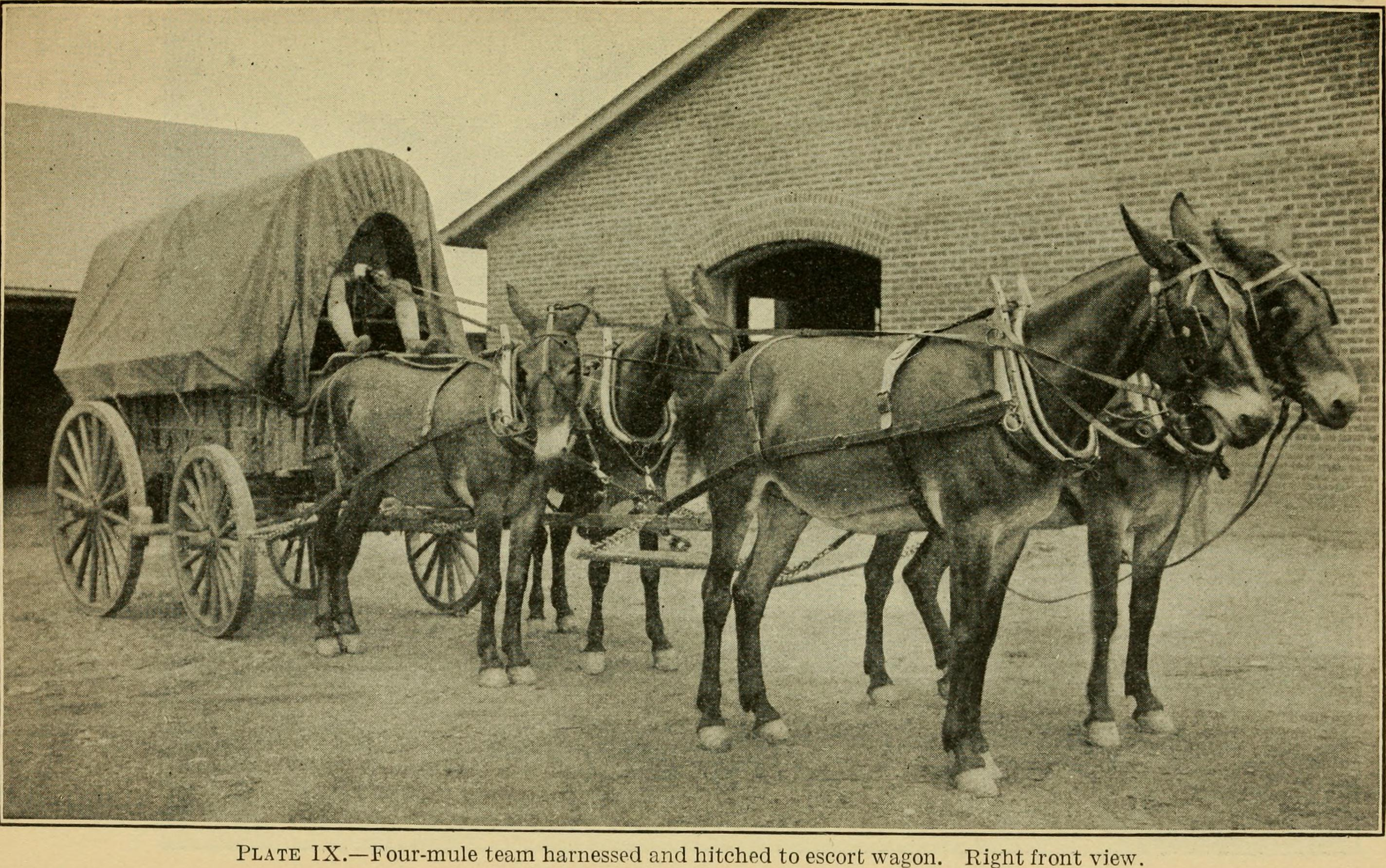
Wagoner driving a team of four mules (US, 1914)

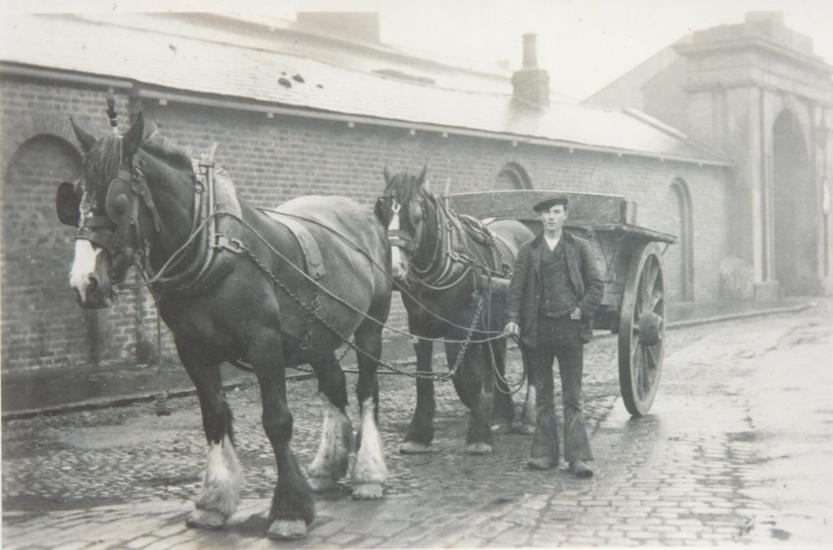
A carter (England, 1910)

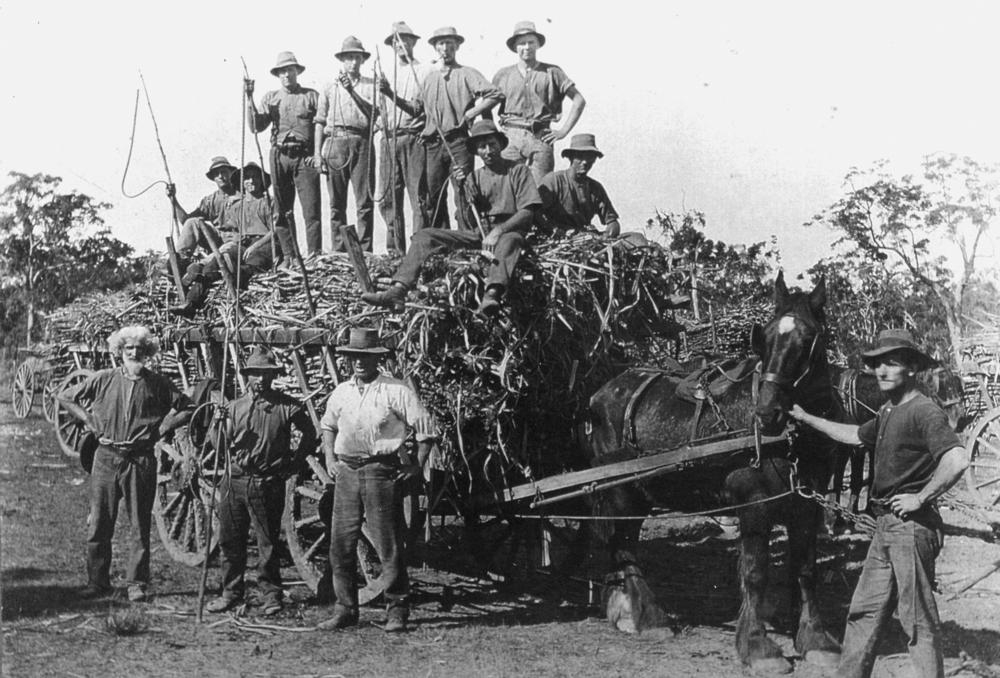
A group of teamsters posing on a loaded wagon (Australia, 1924)

In the horse-drawn era, the term teamster meant a person who drove a team of oxen, horses, or mules pulling a wagon, replacing the earlier teamer. A person hauling a wagon was sometimes called a wagoner, and a person operating a horse and cart for haulage was called a carter.

The term teamster was common by the time of the Mexican–American War (1848) and the Indian Wars throughout the 19th and early 20th centuries on the American frontier.

Another name for the occupation was bullwhacker, related to driving oxen. A teamster might also drive pack animals, such as a muletrain, in which case he was also called a muleteer or muleskinner. Today this person may be called an outfitter or packer.

In Australian English, a teamster was also called a bullocker or bullocky and was sometimes used to denote a carrier.

From the American Revolutionary War at least through World War I, the United States Army enlisted personnel responsible for transporting supplies by wagon and for the upkeep of those draft animals were called wagoners.

== See also ==
- Hostler
