= Backpacking with animals =

Use of pack animals when hiking or camping

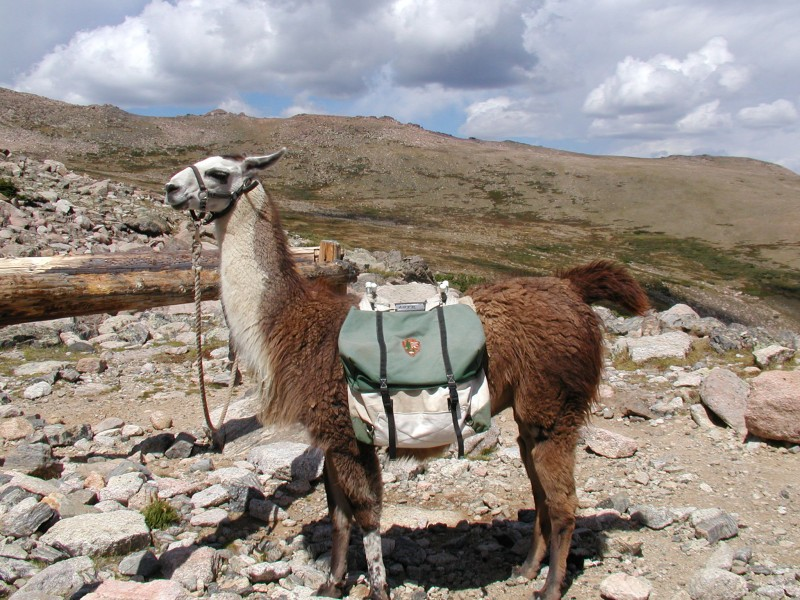
A pack llama in the Rocky Mountain National Park

Pack animals, such as the horse, llama, goat, dog, and donkey, are sometimes used to help carry the weight of a backpackers gear during an excursion. These animals need special considerations when accompanying backpackers on a trip. Some areas restrict the use of horses and other pack animals. For example, Great Basin National Park does not allow domestic animals at all in backcountry areas.

Like their human counterparts, pack animals require special backpacking gear like a variety of leads, harnesses, and panniers or packs. Dog packs are widely available in outdoor sporting goods stores. Predators can be attracted to pack animals, so caution is necessary when bringing domesticated animals into backcountry areas. Some trails have permanent corrals that specifically cater to large pack animals.

== History ==
=== Horse ===
Packhorses have been used since the earliest period of horse domestication. They were invaluable throughout antiquity, through the Middle Ages, and into modern times, used wherever roads were nonexistent or poorly maintained. They were heavily used in the transport of goods in England in the period up until the coming of the first turnpike roads and canals in the 18th century. Away from main routes, their use persisted into the 19th century. This usage has left a history of old paths across wilderness areas called packhorse roads, and distinctive narrow and low sided stone arched packhorse bridges at various locations.

The packhorse, mule or donkey was a critical tool in the development of the Americas. In colonial America, Spanish, French, Dutch and English traders made use of pack horses to carry goods to remote Native Americans and to carry hides back to colonial market centers. They had little choice, the America's had virtually no improved waterways before the 1820s and roads in times before the railroad and automobile were only improved locally around a municipality, and only rarely in between.

=== Mules ===
Mules are still used extensively to transport cargo in rugged roadless regions, such as the large wilderness areas of California's Sierra Nevada mountains. Commercial pack mules are used recreationally, such as to supply mountaineering base camps, and also to supply trail building and maintenance crews, and backcountry footbridge building crews. As of July 2014, there are at least sixteen commercial mule pack stations in business in the Sierra Nevada. The Angeles chapter of the Sierra Club has a Mule Pack Section that organizes hiking trips with supplies carried by mules.

=== Dogs ===
Dogs tend to show admirable hill-climbing ability and can carry a few kilos (several pounds) of gear (their own dry food and other) when among a backpacking party. However, few dogs will be able to traverse the roughest off-trail terrain that their human backpacking companions will cross with little trouble. For example, cross-country travel through fields of 1-meter (3.3-foot) boulders or dense 3/4-meter-tall (2.5-foot) brush may cause a dog to balk or halt entirely. Such balking may be especially pronounced when one or more of these factors is present: small body size, puppyhood or age greater than a few years, obesity, and a dog pack weight of greater than a few kilos or pounds. A steep descent will cause a dog much more hesitation than it will a backpacking human. Restricting travel to well-maintained trails, therefore, may be needed. Attention to a dog's paw condition is important. For example, hidden adhesions of pine pitch between toes may cause balking or limping even when otherwise uncalled for. Otherwise, dogs will need few other special arrangements while backpacking. As experienced owners of large dogs of the working and sporting breeds can attest, a dog in a backpacking party needs comparatively little in terms of insulation, shelter, and bedding. Their food need only consist of some combination of human food scraps, fish scraps, and their own carried dry dog food.

Weather conditions play an important role in a dog's ability to hike safely. It's important to check the weather forecast before heading out and to be aware of how different conditions can affect your dog. For instance, hot weather can lead to overheating, while cold temperatures may require additional gear like dog jackets or blankets to keep your pet warm during breaks. Adjusting plans based on the weather ensures a dog's safety and well-being on the trail.

== See also ==
- Camping
- Mountain guide
- Outfitter
- Pack goat
- Pack saddle
- Pack station
- Trail riding
- Working animal
