= Otago pack saddle =

Rideable saddle for pack animals

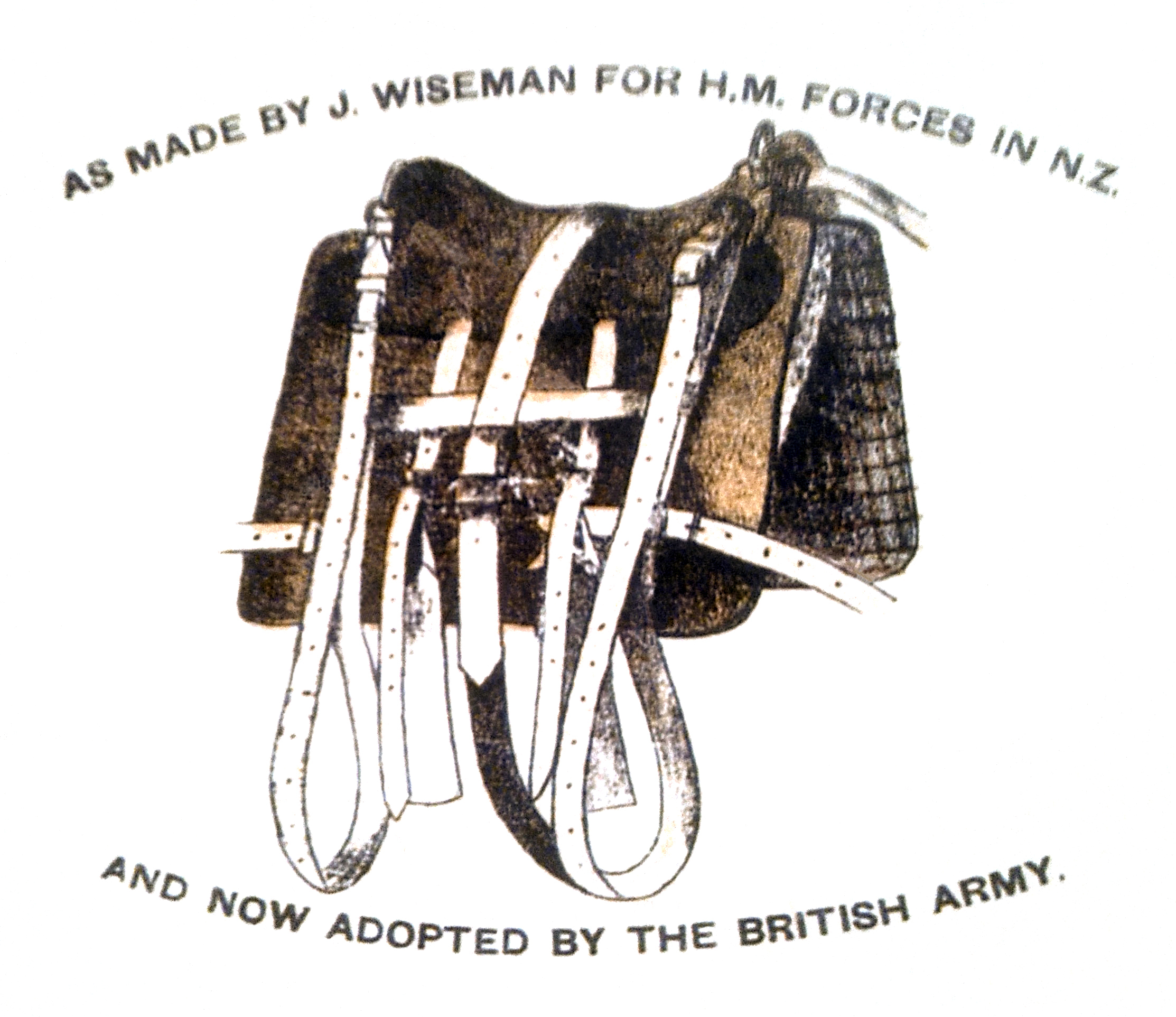
The Otago Pack Saddle as made by J. Wiseman, saddler, Auckland, from 1863

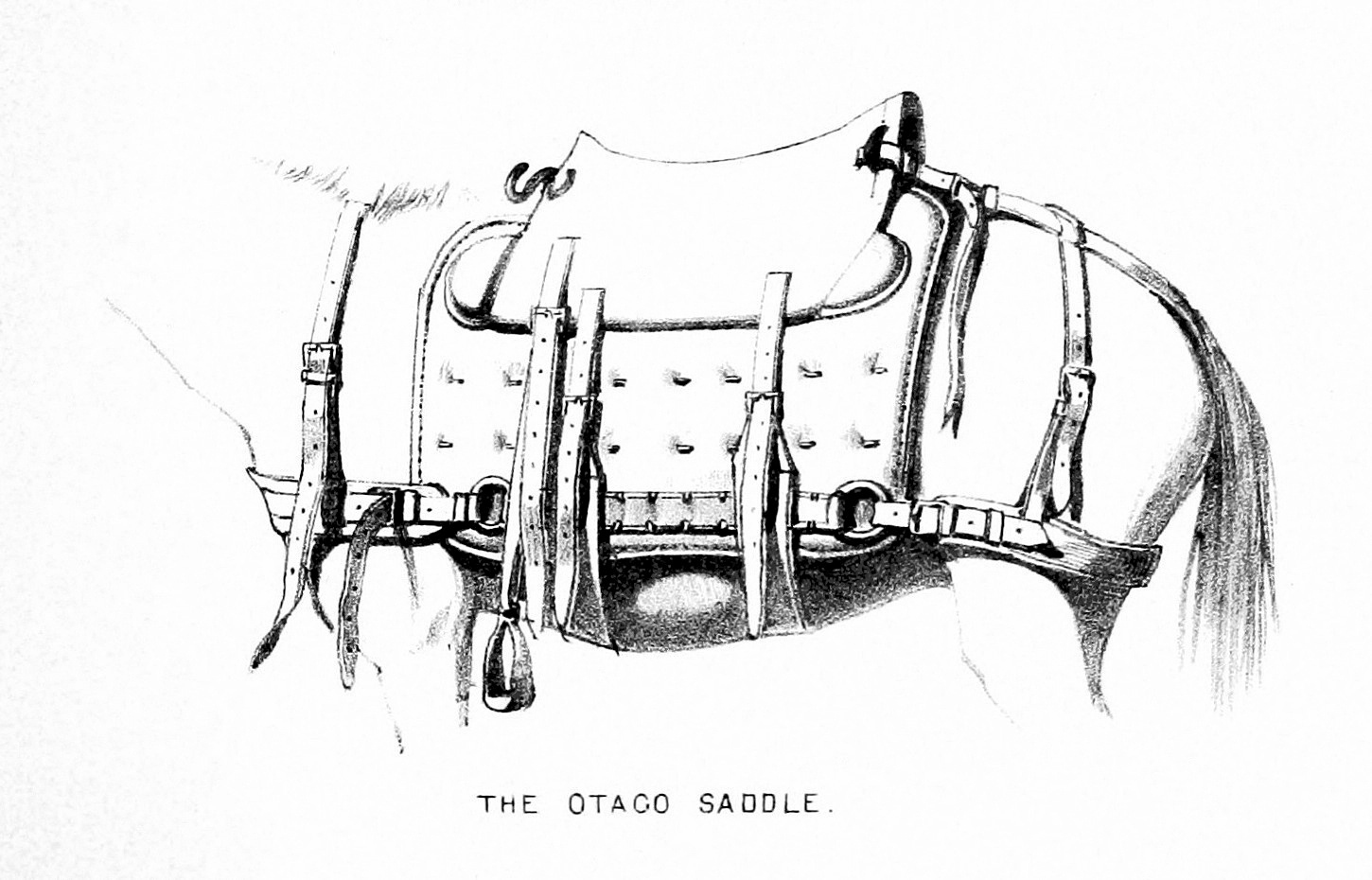
The Otago pack saddle as made for the British Expedition to Abyssinia, 1867

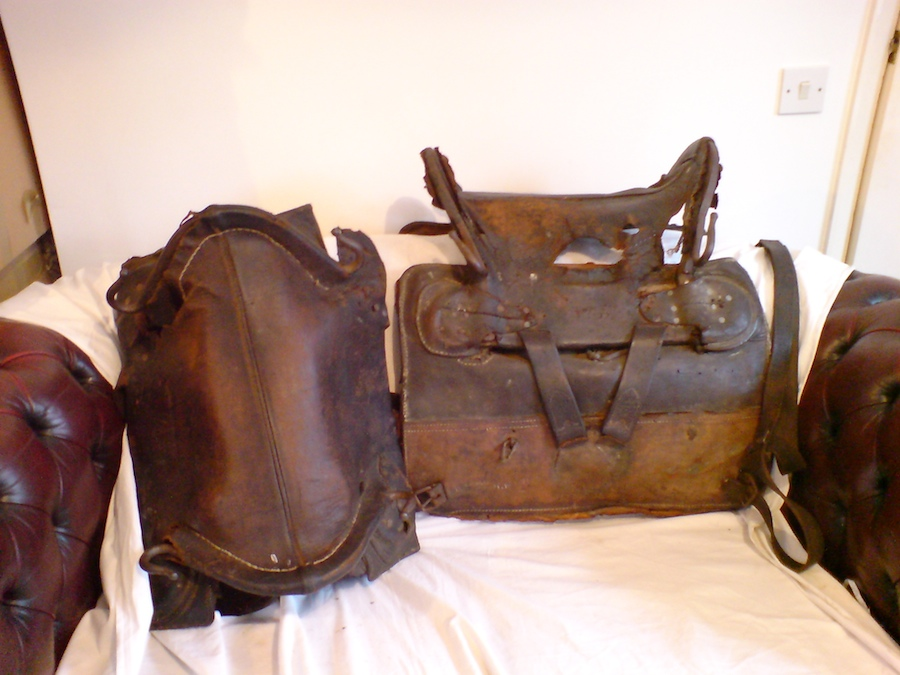
Old pack saddles from New Zealand

The Otago pack saddle, later known as the British universal pack saddle, is a rideable pack saddle devised by Harvey Spiller in Otago, New Zealand, in 1863, to prevent ruinous injuries to horses carrying heavy loads. It was improved and adopted for military use by the Commissariat Transport Corps during the New Zealand wars of 1863–1867 and the Abyssinian expedition of 1867–1868, to become a preferred military general use type also favoured by expeditioners. Apart from horses, it worked well on mules and bullocks when adapted to them.

== Description ==
To spread the load weight on the animal's back and sides, the pack saddle is made up of two large cushioning pads, each fixed to a side bar bridged from one to the other, over the animal, by metal arches located at the pommel and cantle of the seat. The saddle is held in place on the animal by breastplate, breeching and two girths. For ease of loading and unloading, large metal hooks on the arches secure the ropes or straps holding the load. Being rideable to a certain extent, stirrups can be attached. The saddle weighed 25–27 lb (11.34–12.25 kg) stripped, and often as much as 43 lb (19.5 kg).

By 1870, a variation, the Royal Carriage Department pattern, had been devised for hospital and ambulance purposes in carrying field panniers, letters and cacolets, composed of breeching, breast collar, crupper with strap, two web girths, a pair of saddle panels, four breeching or breast straps, two crupper straps and a wantie, and weighed 63 lbs (28.6 kg)

== Origin and development ==
=== Otago gold rush ===
Harvey Spiller, born at Kensington on 17 November 1840, had served as a 2nd lieutenant of the newly formed Northumberland Artillery from June 1859. Following the death of his father, Lieutenant Colonel George Spiller, RA, in 1861, he and his brother had shipped out from Plymouth, Devon, for New Zealand, arriving at Port Chalmers on the Black Swan amid the Otago gold rush in June 1862. Spiller recalled in 1869:

I happened during the year 1863 to be living many miles from up the country in Otago, and was called on to do a large amount of packing. The saddles which I used for the purpose were the common Cape pattern, precisely similar to those supplied from the stores department to the imperial troops. The want of ventilation and the constant friction with the closing of the pads from the weight of the load upon the horses' withers and the ridge of the back speedily rendered every animal I had useless. I tried the riding saddle, making additions to it and alterations as I found necessary from time to time to effect the object I had in view. The idea upon which I worked was suggested to me by the principle adopted in the knapsack invented by my late father, Colonel Spiller, of the Royal Artillery, in 1861. I worked at it for a considerable time, and incurred no small expense, until I realised my conception of what a pack saddle ought to be, and which I found, I am glad to say, work perfectly in every particular, whether horses or bullocks were employed.

=== New Zealand campaigns ===
During the Waikato campaign, Spiller took a commission as a lieutenant of the 3rd Waikato Regiment, Colonial Militia, from 19 October 1863 and was later attached to the Commissariat Transport Corps under Assistant Commissary General James Bailey.

Bailey had arrived in New Zealand in 1861, following the outbreak of the Taranaki war in 1860. He had joined the Imperial Service in 1848, served the Board of Works in Ireland to 1851, Commissariat at the Cape of Good Hope to 1854, as Deputy Assistant Commissary General in Turkey and Crimea in 1854–1856, present at the battle of Alma and siege of Sebastopol, in Bermuda for three years and northern China for over a year. By July 1861 he'd had put together the Commissariat Transport Corps (CTC), at Penrose Camp on the Great South Road, Auckland. CTC men were drawn from British troops and the colonial militia. One hundred packhorses were ordered from Sydney, 85 pack and ambulance horses were purchased in Auckland along with 30 double-draught animals and 450 pack saddles. Bullocks were purchased in Taranaki and Auckland.

When Spiller joined the CTC in 1863–64, the Waikato campaign had been underway since July 1863. The CTC had been repairing existing bullock, horse and artillery pattern pack saddles, and followed on with a call for the supply of new government issue Cape pack saddles—100 in August and 150 in November. Though mule sized, the Cape pack saddles were used on the horses with the effect of galling their backs and crippling CTC efficacy. Spiller, employed in the field in the Waikato and at Tauranga, noted:

The destruction of the pack animals from the use of the Government pack saddle was a constant theme of animadversion. I spoke of my invention to the Director of Transport, Commissary-General Baily, and he requested me to get a saddle made after my plan, which I did at my own expense, and which upon trial was entirely approved of, and obtained the favourable notice of General Sir D. Cameron, K.C.B.; General Sir T. Chute, K.C.B.; Colonel O'Brian, Commanding Military Train; Colonel Gamble, Quartermaster-General; Colonel Moule, Royal Engineers; Commissary-General Jones, Commissary-General Baily, Major Baker, Assistant Adjutant-General; Captain H. Hill, aide-de-camp; Major the Hon. F. Le P. Trench, 40th Regiment; Captain Tigh, who commanded my own division of Transport—all or any of whom could corroborate the truth of my statement and substantiate the justice of my claim.

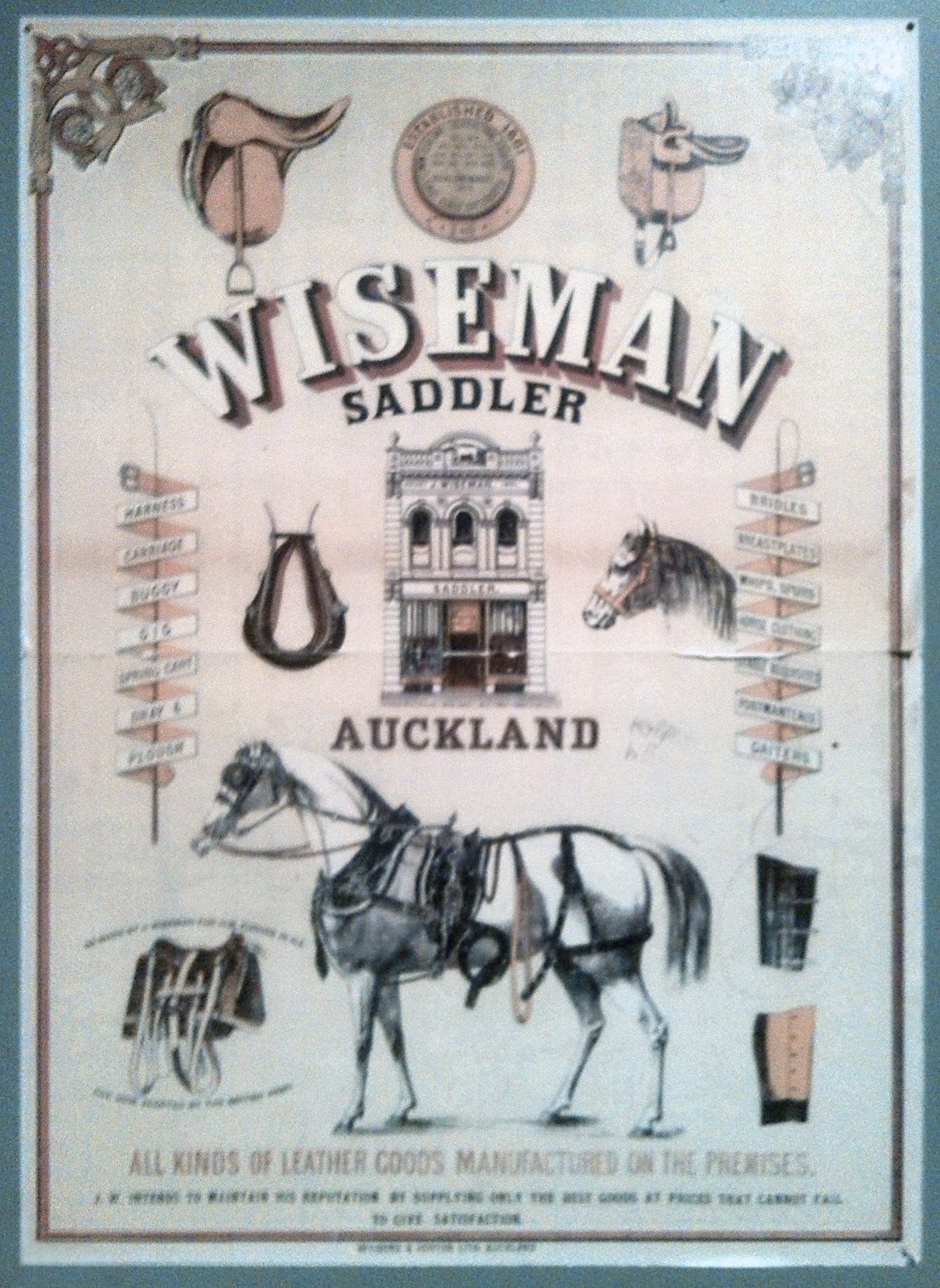
Poster for Wiseman, Saddler, Auckland

Trials of Spiller's pack saddle proved it to be a vast improvement on existing patterns and, accordingly, Lieutenant General Duncan Cameron accepted it for use in the campaign. Manufactured in quantity by J & A Wiseman, saddle, collar and harness manufacturers of Queen Street, Auckland, branded "CTC" and settled into service on the transport network, they played their part well throughout the campaign. Deputy Commissary General Edward Strickland, stationed at Taranaki, commented to Commissary General Humphrey Stanley Jones in 1865:

I believe the pack-saddle now in use with this army merits notice. I know of nothing so good as it. It is the pack-saddle used by the Otago diggers. The framework of the saddle is raised high above the horse's withers, whilst the sides of it sit firmly on the horse. It forms a good riding saddle. The load can be easily balanced and steadied upon it, or placed upon it or taken down from it of a dark night. When making a night march I have loaded seventy-nine horses in twenty minutes, without noise of confusion. As yet, not a horse has been hurt by it.

During the war, the CTC had grown to 41 officers, 125 non-commissioned officers, 1341 men, with 1616 horses and 728 bullocks. As the war itself wound down through 1865–66, and in consequence of ongoing attacks, the CTC was disbanded. By mid-February 1866 it had sold most of its horses, drays and horse and bullock gear by public auction. The men returned to their Waikato regiments and farms or moved to headquarters at Tauranga, leaving Penrose Camp desolate. Public sales of Commissariat Transport Corps and Military Train animals and gear carried on at Te Awamutu, Ngaruawahia, Papakura and New Plymouth in April–May, releasing more pack saddles into public use.

With regiments returning home from New Zealand from that year on, Bailey and his family left Auckland for London on 10 January 1867. He had supplied a sample Otago pack saddle or two with an accompanying report to the War Office in England in March 1866, where it had undergone trials at Aldershot and Woolwich with the result of the Ordnance Select Committee sealing the Otago pattern for general commissariat purposes on 9 July. It was then put into storage.

=== Abyssinian Expedition, 1867–68 ===
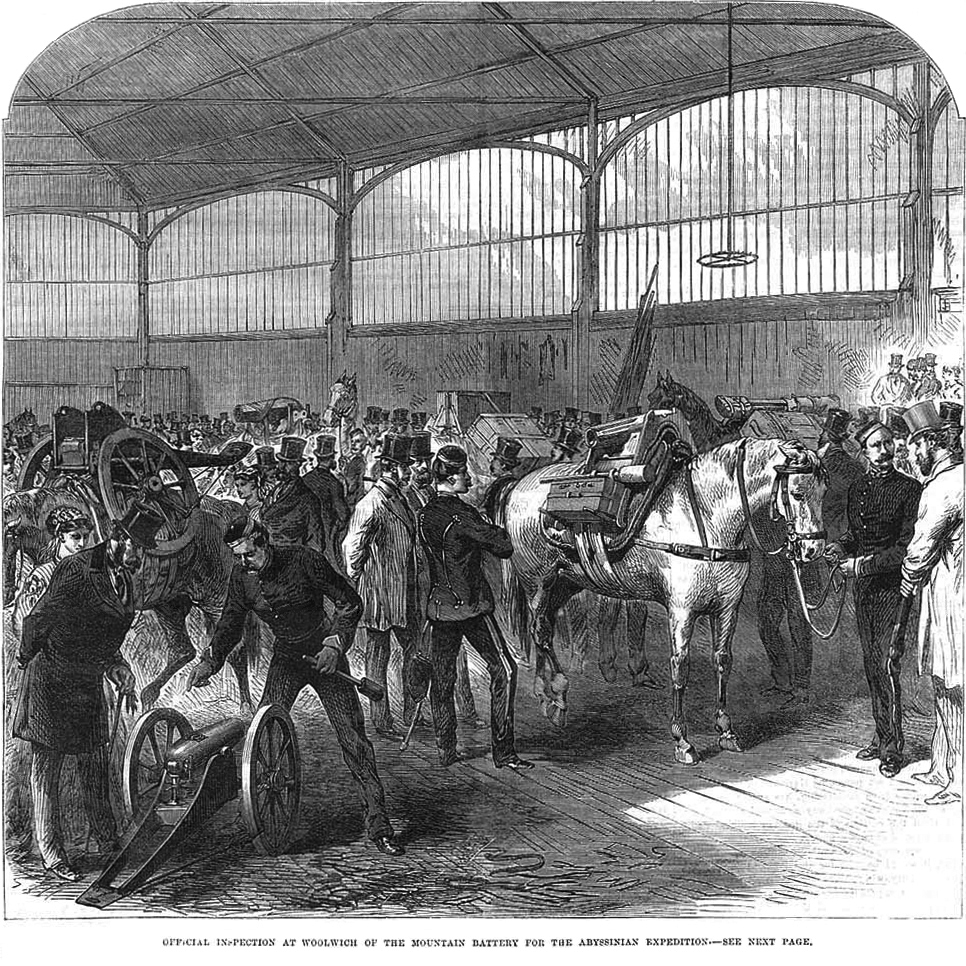
Official inspection at Woolwich of the mountain battery for the Abyssinian expedition, 1867

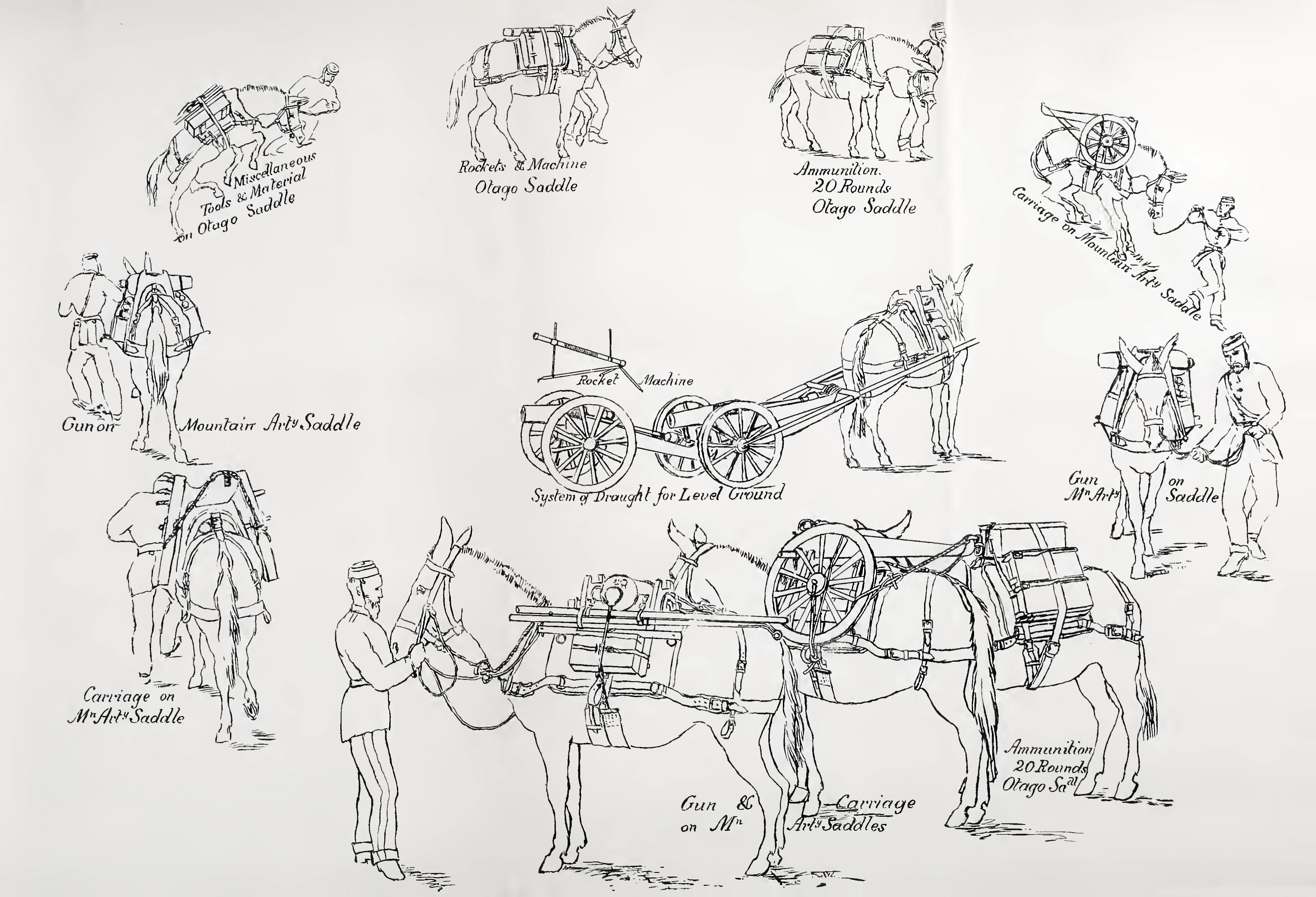
Otago pack paddle loads, 1867–68

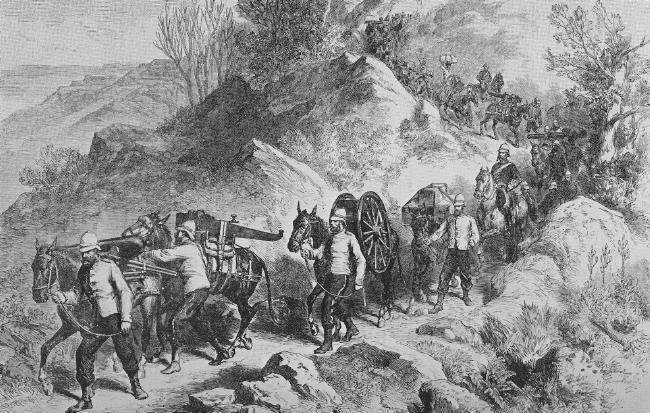
The mountain battery on the return trail from Magdala, 1868

In consequence of frustrated appeals to Emperor Tewodros II of Abyssinia to the free missionary and British government representatives held by him, the British Expedition to Abyssinia to rescue them was announced on 21 August 1867. In review of the vast amount of equipage required to cross Abyssinia's mountainous terrain, concerns over the suitability of pack saddles broke at the War Office in September 1867. Ordnance Select Committee member Colonel Edward Wray, RA, ACG James Bailey, returned from New Zealand, Joseph Aspinall and Captain Gordon met at the Royal Arsenal, Woolwich, on 10 September to inspect and report on the general service pack saddle, of which 5,000 were being prepared for shipment, and a copy of the Otago pack saddle Bailey had sent from New Zealand.

In their reports to Sir John Pakington, Secretary of State for War, and Sir Edward Lugard, Permanent Under-Secretary of State for War: Bailey concluded "that the Otago saddle is really a serviceable and useful article of equipment, and, from my personal experience in New Zealand, I know can be carried by pack animals with very little injury to their backs." In his view, the general service pack saddle, would render many animals unserviceable or useless after a few days of work. He imagined that a few thousand of these easy made Otago saddles could be manufactured in England at short notice; Aspinall considered the general service pack saddle adjusted for mules to be "totally unfit for Commissariat purposes", "practically useless except for the carrying of sick and wounded soldiers". It was cumbersome, unnecessarily heavy at 51 lbs (23.13 kg), and almost certain to produce sore backs and sides. He preferred the saddles similar to those used in Spain and Mexico, which enabled animals to carry 30 or 40% more weight and were superior in every way to any others; and Wray endorsed Bailey's opinion to immediately prepare as many Otago saddles as may be necessary for the expedition. Accordingly, the Otago pack saddle was adopted for the expedition.

The Military Store had advised that, if quickly acted upon, a large proportion of 5000 saddles could be supplied in a month, with the whole completed in six weeks from date of order. They recommended the saddles be made by trade saddlers in three sizes according to supplied patterns, with no more than 500 saddles per contractor. The general service pack saddle was condemned, the order for their manufacture cancelled and supplied saddles recalled. James Bailey also designed an iron cradle for carrying mountain battery gun and carriage. It could be attached to any one of the Otago saddles in a few minutes.

Henry Morton Stanley, a special correspondent of the New York Herald embedded in the Abyssinian Expedition, along with a sizable contingent of journalists, several European observers, translators, artists and photographers, observed that:

The saddles in use were various; the three principal were the Bombay pad, the cumbersome Turkish, an English saddle termed the 'Otago,' and the McMahon.

The Otago saddle in my opinion is the best that can be invented. It is made of good stout English leather. The sides are made of English leather sewn over two square pads, which overlap the flanks of the animal. These are connected by strong curved iron bows enclosed with leather, which rise three inches above the spine of the animal. Two hooks are fixed on each side, to which stout straps of the necessary length, folding any kind of baggage, are slung. Its weight is but 28 lbs. The McMahon is also a very compact saddle, but its excessive weight of 66 lbs. precludes all possibility of its ever being adopted for general use.

=== Henry Morton Stanley's expedition, 1871 ===
Summoned to Paris in October 1869, James Gordon Bennett Jr. of the New York Herald sent Henry Morton Stanley to find the missing missionary Dr David Livingstone. Stanley recalled of his preparations in Zanzibar:

After collecting the donkeys, I discovered there were no pack-saddles to be obtained in Zanzibar. Donkeys without pack-saddles were of no use whatsoever. I invented a saddle to be manufactured by myself and my white man Farquhar, wholly from canvas, rope, and cotton.

Three or four frasilahs of cotton, and ten bolts of canvas were required for the saddles. A specimen saddle was made by myself in order to test its efficacy. A donkey was taken and saddled, and a load of 140lbs. was fastened to it, and though the animal—a wild creature of Unyamwezi—struggled and reared frantically, not a particle gave way. After this experiment, Farquhar was set to work to manufacture twenty-one more after the same pattern. Woollen pads were also purchased to protect the animals from being galled. It ought to be mentioned here, perhaps, that the idea of such a saddle as I manufactured, was first derived from the Otago saddle, in use among the transport-trains of the English army in Abyssinia.

== Recognition ==
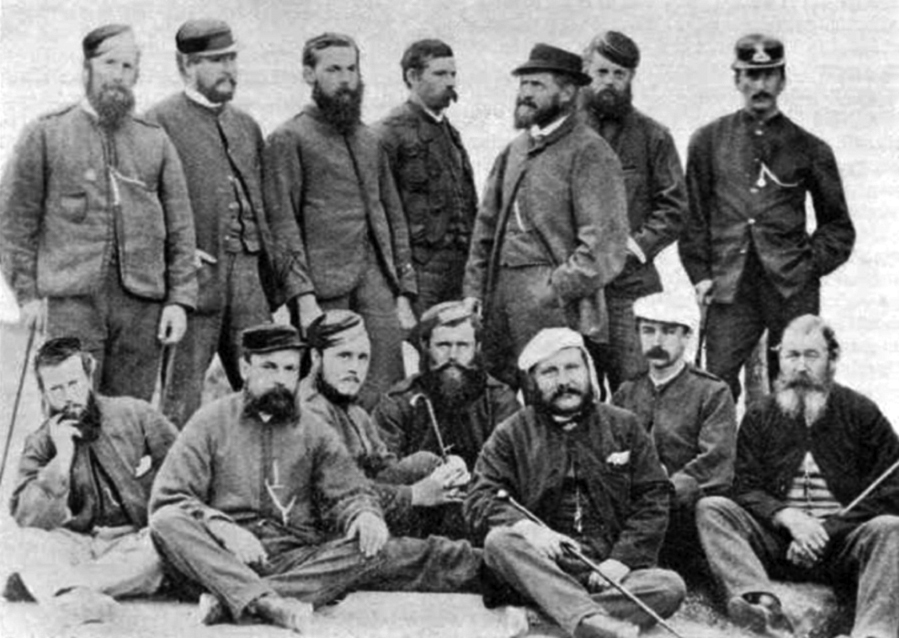
Colonial Defence Force officers, Waikaremoana Expedition, 1866: Standing from left: William Richardson, Henry Handley, Davis, Walter Gudgeon, Jasper Herrick, Harvey Spiller, Milner. Sitting from left: James Witty, Ferguson, Henry Northcroft, David Scannell, Maurice Bower, Alfred Corfield, Edward Withers.

As the Commissariat Transport Corps disbanded in 1866, Lieutenant Harvey Spiller was appointed to rank of Captain in the Auckland Militia on 7 May, and then to Sub-Inspector in the New Zealand Armed Constabulary in October 1868, to command Wairoa (Waverley), Taranaki, for Tītokowaru's War, 1868–1869.

In 1869, a friend drew his attention to a letter published in the Army and Navy Gazette of 25 July 1868 giving, in its "large admixture of truth", praise to the Director of Transport in relation to his invention. Spiller sought to put the truth of the origin of the saddle on record in a letter to the Army and Navy Gazette of 19 June 1869, and there he seems to have left the matter.

Spiller was issued the New Zealand War Medal in 1871 and perhaps another medal for Wairoa. He resigned the New Zealand Armed Constabulary in January 1874, and returned to England, joined the Hampshire Regiment of Militia Infantry with a rank of Captain on 20 January 1874. He was granted the honorary rank of Major on 31 May 1879 and resigned 6 April 1881.
