= Pack station =

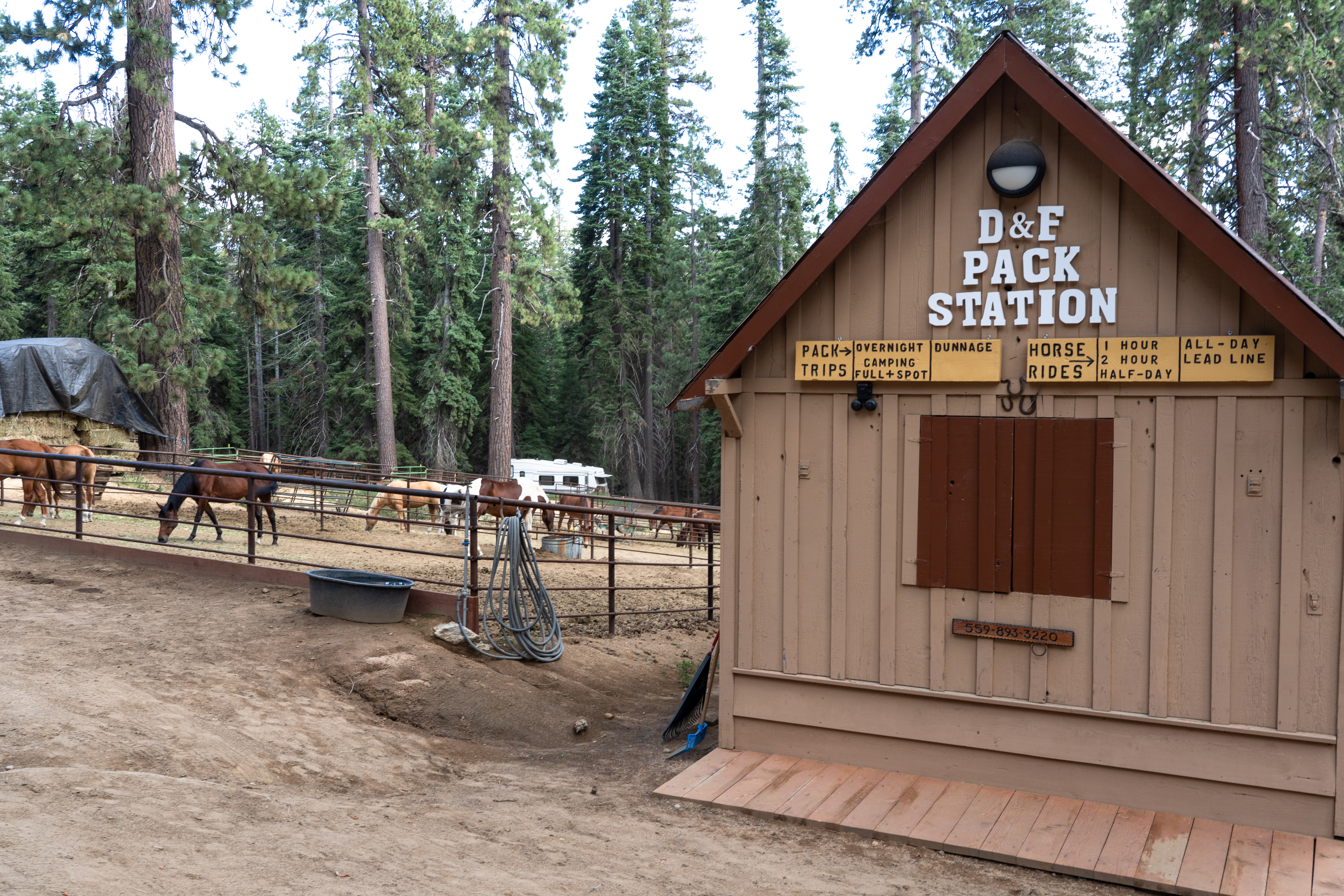
Pack Station at the Kaiser Wilderness trailhead in Lakeshore, Fresno County, California

A pack station is the base of operations for transporting freight via pack animals in areas that do not allow for other forms of transportation, either due to difficult access or use restrictions as defined in Wilderness Act. The station facilitates the transition from mechanized transportation to pack animals, and necessarily includes a corral for the animals and sometimes a stock loading ramp. In some places there may also be a barn or other structure to house feed and tack, and a loading dock or shelter for the items to be transported. In locations on private land, there may be a business office on site.

The term "pack station" is most often used in California in the Sierra Nevada. In other parts of the US, outfitters may simply refer to a permanent or semi-permanent trailhead or wilderness camp as a "station" or "outfitter camp."

== How packing works ==
One wrangler on horseback can usually handle up to five pack mules, who are tethered together in a line called a pack string.

Many commercial outfitters today support recreation activities such as camping and fishing trips and hunting expeditions. Government agencies such as the U.S. Forest Service and the National Park Service, as well as a few commercial outfitters have pack operations to transport construction materials, trail tools, and firefighting equipment into wilderness areas.

In either case, the process and techniques used are very similar to those developed prior to the era of motor vehicles. Customers arrange for a meeting time or a delivery time and drop their goods and supplies at the pack station. Packing services are charged by the pound or by the animal, typically with a minimum price depending on the distance from the pack station. Everything is weighed, sorted for each animal, then split 50/50 to get a balanced load on each side of the animal; an unbalanced load will cause the saddle to slide to the heavy side, causing discomfort to the animal, and potentially inviting disaster. The average mule can carry as much as 300 pounds (140 kg). A mammoth donkey can carry up to 200 lb (90 kg) and standard donkey limit is 125 lb (60 kg). However, most pack station mule loads are limited to 150 pounds (70 kg)

== Permits ==
Outfitters generally operate within the boundaries of public land and are required to maintain an outfitters permit. USDA Forest Service calls this a special-use permit. A separate permit is required if the pack station or wilderness caches are located on public land.

== See also ==
- Packhorse
- Pack animal
- Pack saddle
- Guest ranch
- Outfitter
