= Breeching (tack) =

Strap around the haunches of a draft, pack, or riding animal

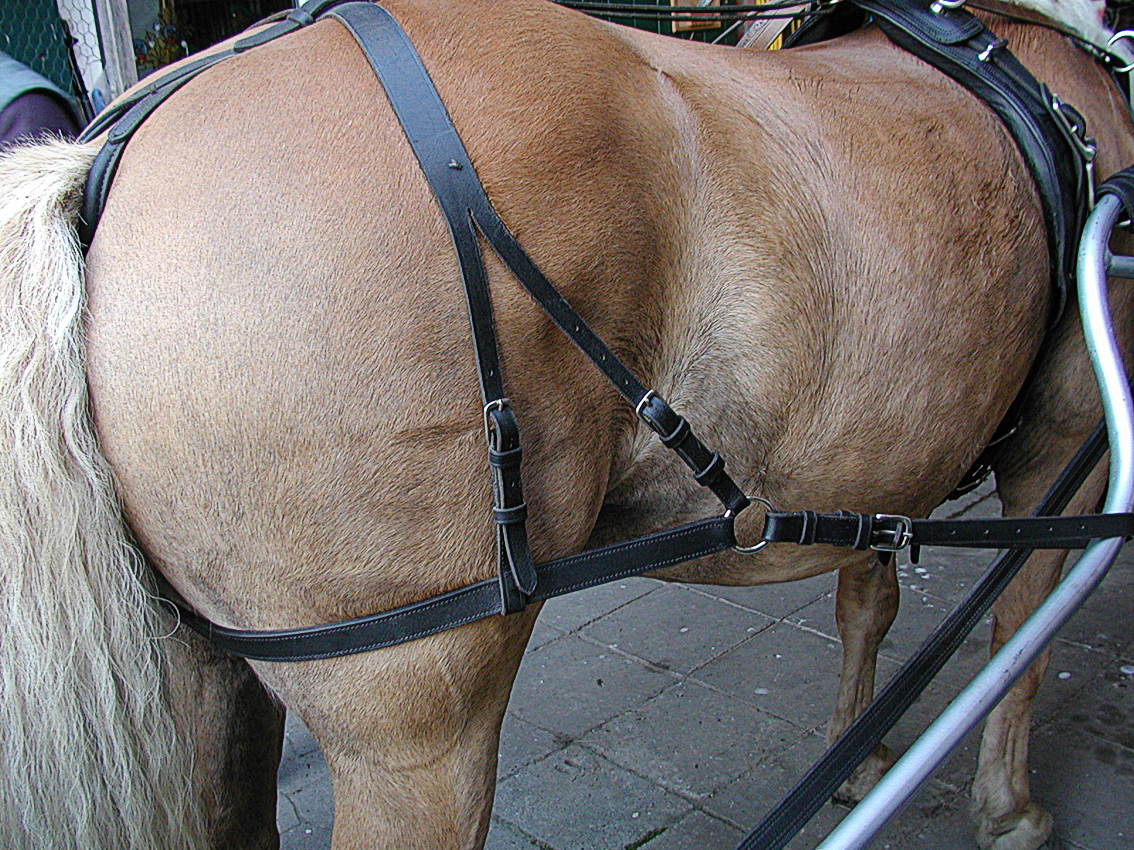
Harness breeching

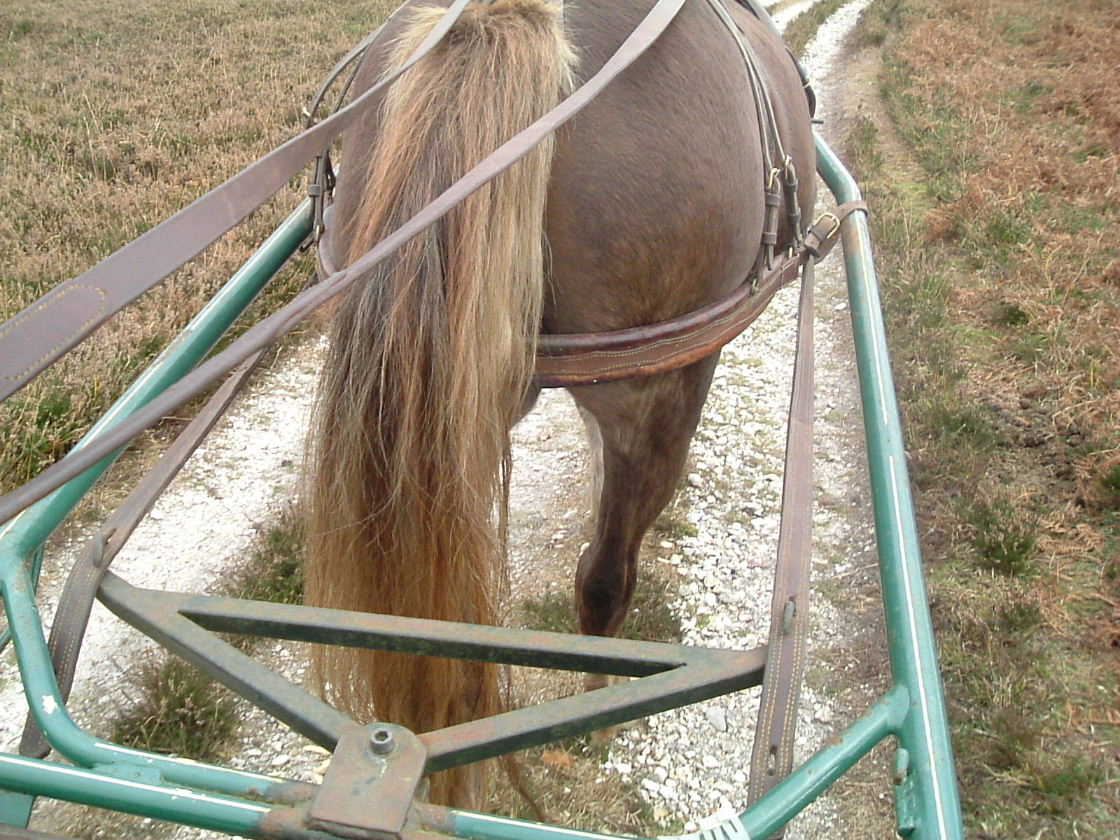
Breeching on a horse in a light cart

Breeching (/ˈbrɪtʃɪŋ/ "britching") is a strap around the hindquarters of a draft, pack or riding animal. Both under saddle and in harness, breeching engages when an animal slows down or travels downhill and is used to brake or stabilize a load.

== History ==
The breeching strap traces its roots back to the Chinese-invented breast-strap or "breastcollar" harness developed during the Warring States (481–221 BC) era. The Chinese breast harness became known throughout Central Asia by the 7th century, introduced to Europe by the 8th century. The breeching strap would allow the horse to hold or brake the load, as horse harnesses were previously attached to vehicles by straps around their necks, and previously designed harnesses would constrict the horse's neck, preventing the horse from pulling heavier loads. The breeching strap acted as a brake when a cart tried to run forward when moving downwards on a slope and also made it possible to maneuver the cart in the reverse direction.

== Harness breeching ==
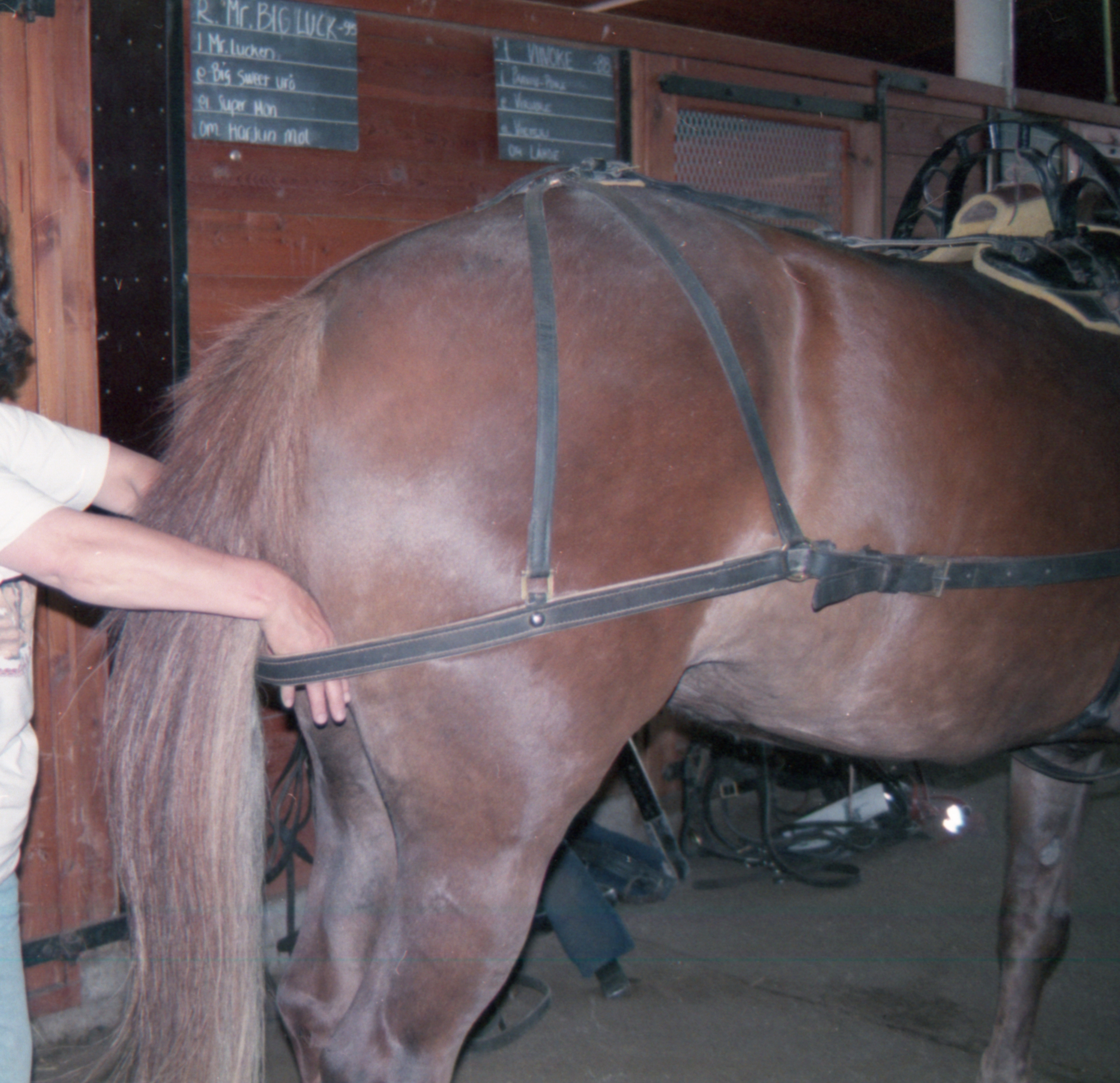
Demonstrates proper breeching adjustment, with hands indicating the recommended looseness

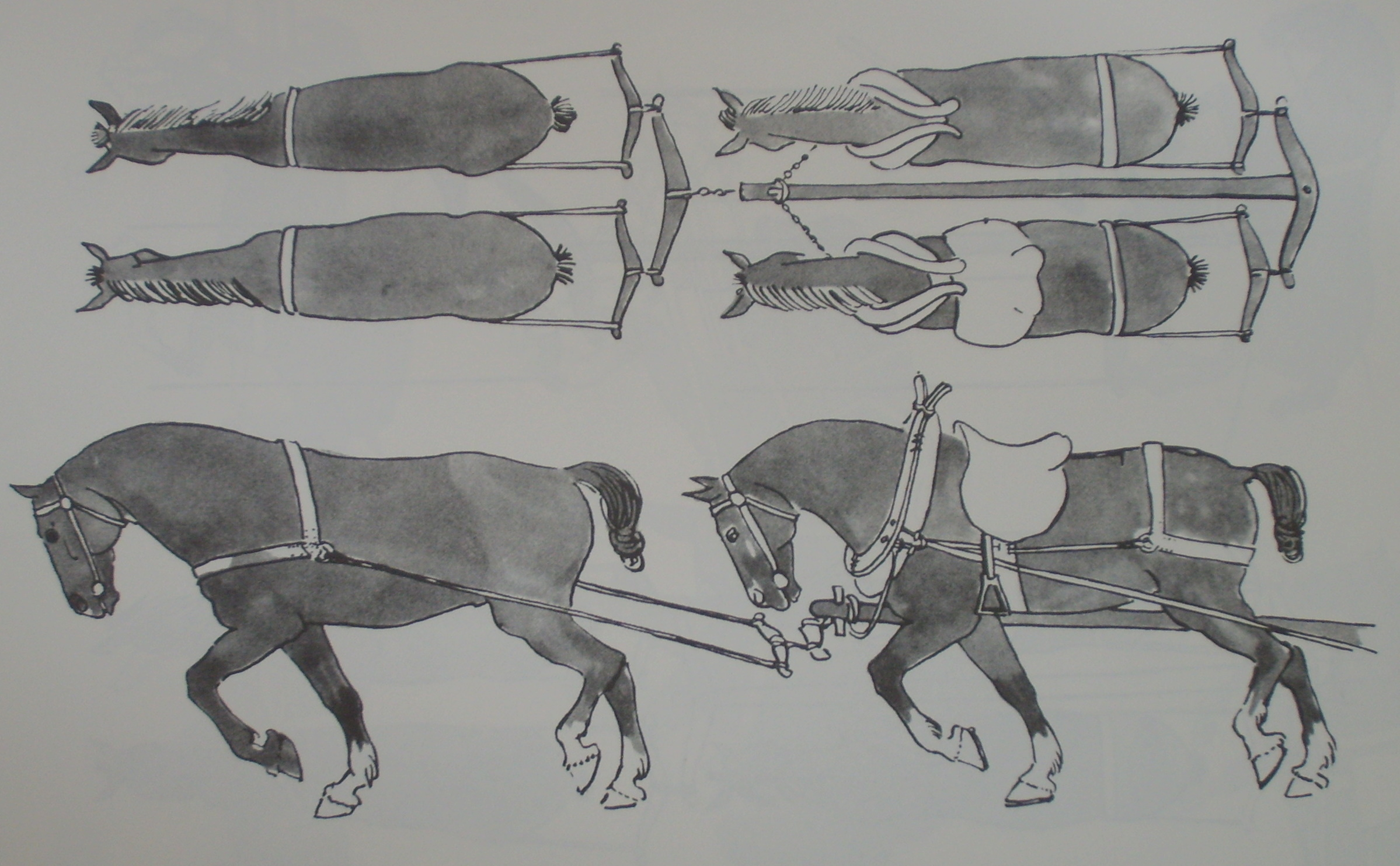
Breeching on wheelers, attached to their collars, which are attached in turn to the vehicle pole

When a horse, mule, or other animal is in harness, harness breeching (also known as full breeching) helps the animal to slow or control the forward movement of a vehicle. Animal-drawn vehicles have either a pair of shafts or a single pole projecting forward for about the length of one animal. An animal between shafts wears a harness breeching, which attaches forward to the shafts. As the animal slows, the vehicle runs forward, and the shafts pull the breeching forward against the haunches of the animal, which can thus slow the vehicle. A vehicle with a pole has a pair of animals on either side of it – their breeching works in a similar way, attaching forward to the pole either directly or by way of their collars. In a larger team, the leaders are in front of the shafts or pole and thus cannot slow the vehicle; nevertheless, they sometimes wear breeching for show.

Breeching may be omitted where the animal does not need to provide substantial braking. For example, in a very light harness, such as in a sulky used for harness racing or in a light cart used with fine harness, the weight of the vehicle and passenger is little enough that the girth and crupper of the harness provide sufficient braking support. Breeching may also be omitted if the vehicle has efficient brakes on the wheels – examples include larger carriages and modern vehicles with disk brakes. Similarly, breeching and the requisite shafts or pole are not needed for a dragged load such as a plow or a log that will not move on its own, nor for a canal boat, which is towed by a long rope from the bank.

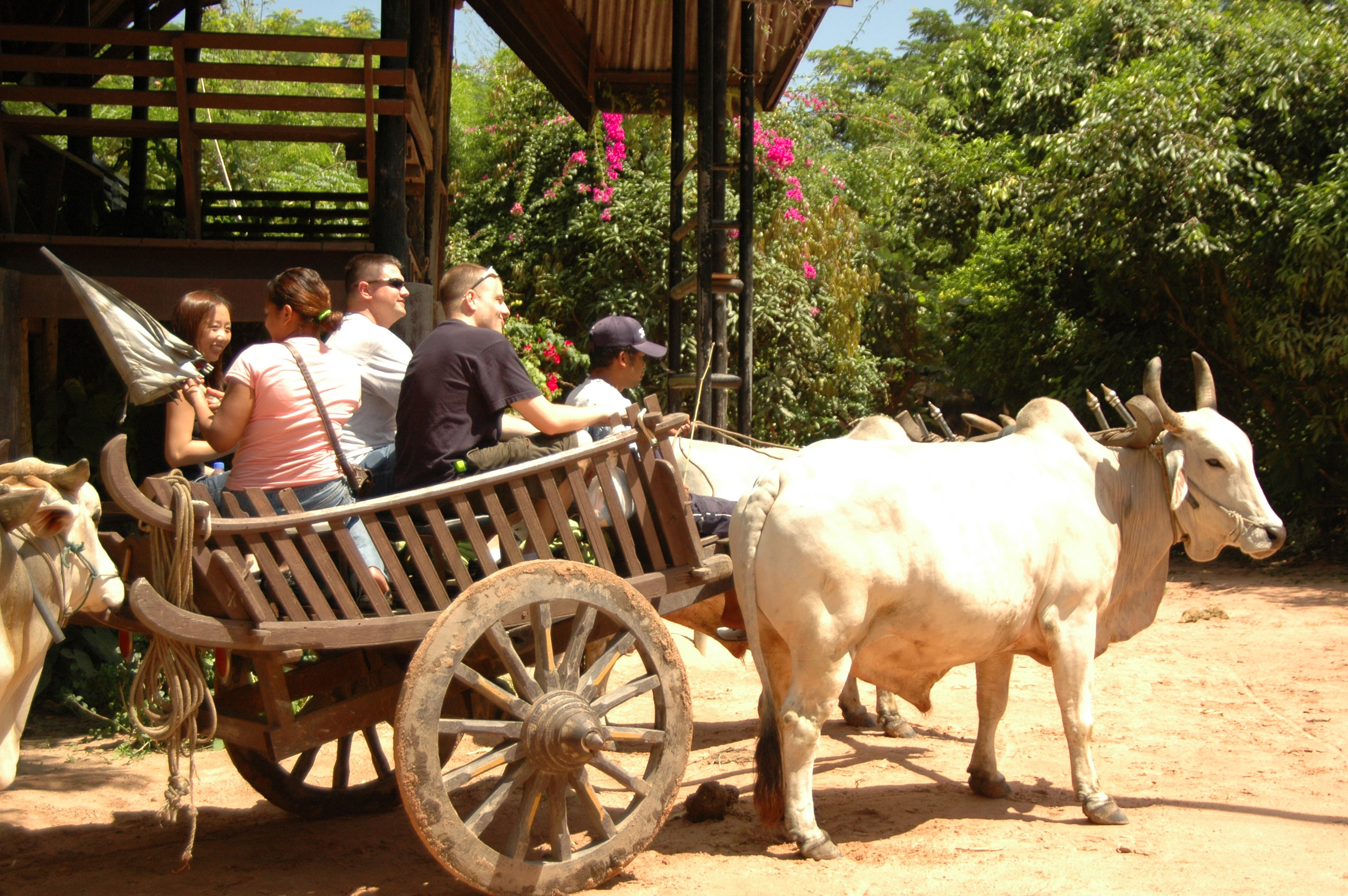
Oxen harnessed to a cart by bow yokes alone

Historically, additional animals were sometimes used to brake very heavy vehicles on steep downhills, being hitched in harness breeching behind the load. This is still done when logging in very steep terrain.

Breeching is not normally used for oxen in yokes, where braking is provided by pulling back on the yoke or girth (depending upon the type of yoke).

== False breeching ==
On a light vehicle with shafts, false breeching is sometimes fitted to the vehicle, instead of using harness breeching. A horizontal strap is attached between the shafts of the vehicle, just behind the animal. When the animal slows or goes downhill, the vehicle runs forward, pushing the false breeching against the haunches of the animal, which can then push backwards to slow the vehicle. False breeching is generally limited to use with well-trained, steady animals, because if the animal rears or falls, there is a risk of the false breeching running up over its back. It is sometimes used to help show off the animal's haunches, which would be partly covered by harness breeching.

== Saddle breeching ==
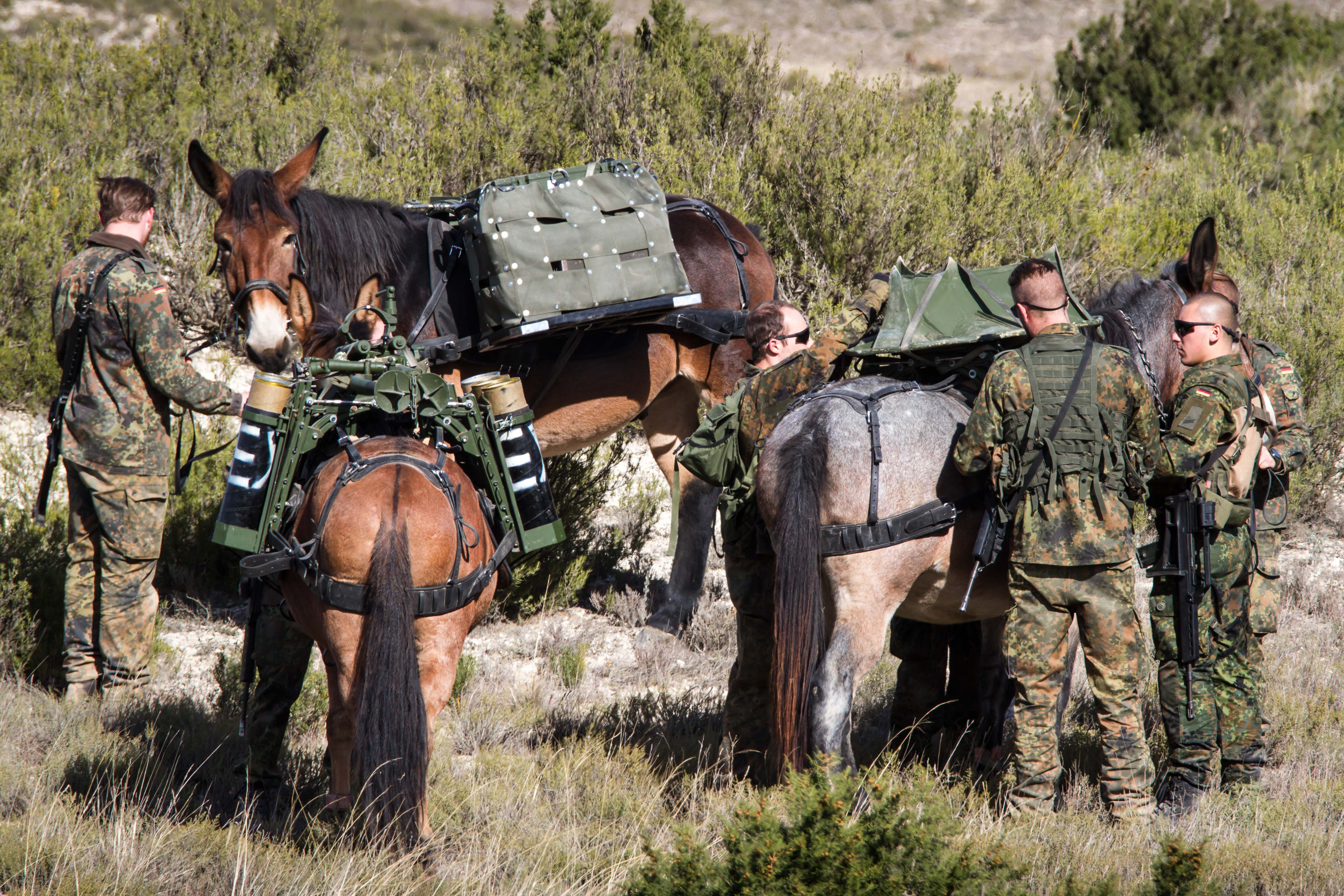
Loaded Army pack mules with heavy-duty breeching

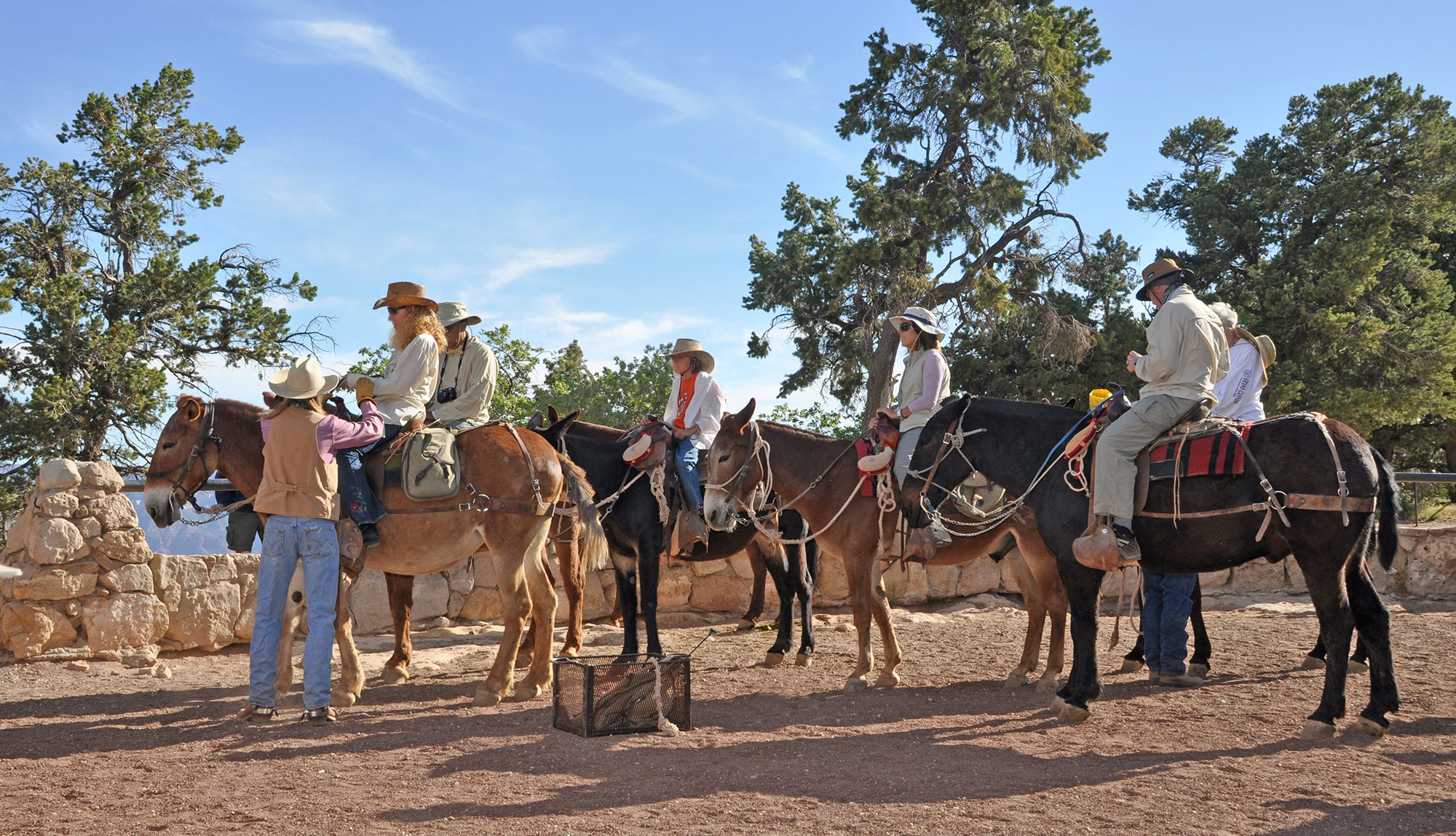
Grand Canyon tourist mules wearing breeching

On both pack and riding stock, if breeching is used, then generally a breastplate is used as well.

Pack animals

Breeching may be used to stabilize the pack saddle of a packhorse or other pack animal, by keeping the saddle from sliding forward, especially on downhill tracks. Pack horse breeching may be supplemented with a crupper to provide additional stability.

Riding animals

Breeching is occasionally used in a similar manner as that of a pack saddle, especially when riding mules. Mules often have lower withers and flatter backs than horses, making it likely that the saddle will slide forward when going downhill with a rider. However, a crupper is more commonly used on riding animals in general.

== See also ==
- Driving (horse)
