= Outfitter =

Shop or person selling specialized clothes

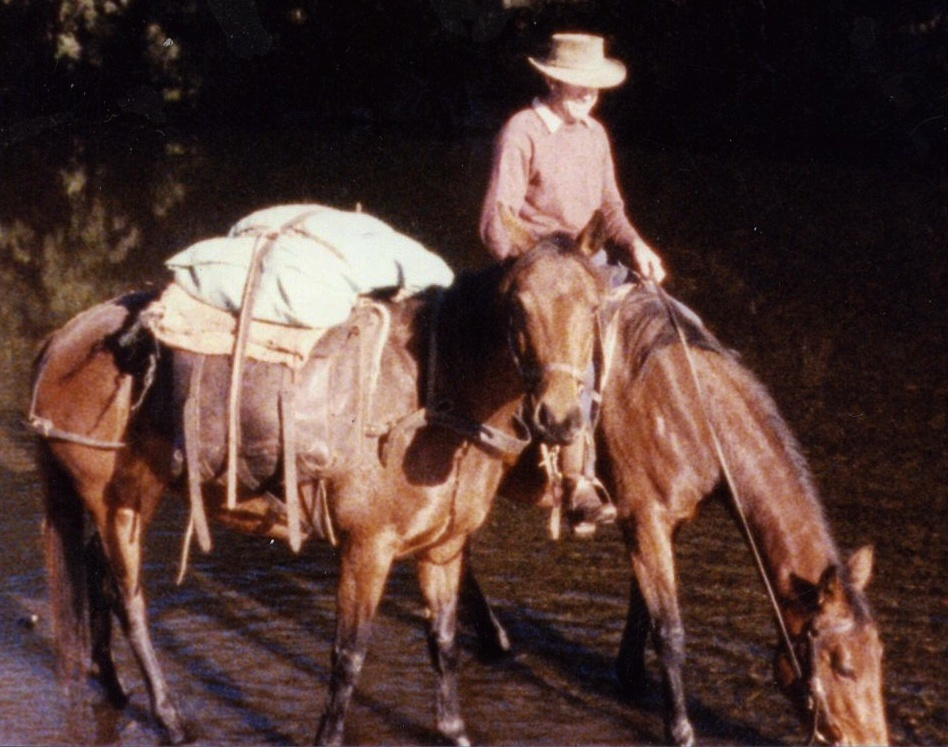
Australian stockman on mustering trip

An outfitter is a shop or person that sells specialized clothes (an outfit is a set of clothing). More specifically, it is a company or individual who provides or deals in equipment and supplies for the pursuit of certain activities.

In North America, the term is most closely associated with outdoor activities such as hunting, fishing, canoeing, hiking, rafting and trail riding using pack stations. In this context, outfitters include those that offer services for outdoor tourism including accommodations and guide services. Many retail stores and chains that sell outdoor sports gear call themselves "outfitters", such as: Bass Pro Shops, Cabela's, Mountain Equipment Co-op, and REI (Recreational Equipment Inc.).

== Canada ==
In the Canadian province of Alberta, guides and outfitters are monitored by and members of APOS (Alberta Professional Outfitters Society). APOS members adhere to strict guidelines in regards to their outfitting operations, thus APOS is the governing body of the outfitting industry in Alberta. In the province of Quebec, the Québec Outfitter Federation Inc. (Fédération des pourvoiries du Québec inc.) represents 375 member outfitters.

== United States ==
In the United States outfitters may be required to hold a state license to operate. Many outfitters provide equipment and services on lands administered by the National Forest Service and other federal agencies. These outfitters may be required by those agencies to obtain special use permits. In the state of Montana all fly fishing guides are required to register and work under the permit of an outfitter. Legislation exists in other states and is also being considered because of the public safety and resource management concerns regarding hunting and fishing. In some jurisdictions outfitters are authorized to accept and process government documents on behalf of a state agency, such as hunting and fishing permits or marine vehicle licenses.

== See also ==
- Camping
- Guide
  - Mountain guide
- Pack animal
  - Pack goat
- Pack saddle
- Working animal
