= Frasilah =

A frasilah is a historical weight unit that was used in the 19th century on the island of Zanzibar and in eastern Africa. A frasilah is equivalent to about 35 pounds (16 kg). This weight unit was used mainly by the Arabs involved in the ivory trade to weigh the mass of elephant tusks and other goods used in the trade, such as beads, cloth and brass wire. In 1871, a frasilah of ivory could be purchased inland for 20 US$ (around 500 US$ in 2011) in goods and sold in Zanzibar for about 60 US$ (around 1 500 US$ in 2011).

== East Africa ==
In Mozambique, one frasil was equivalent to 5.443 kilograms as a trade weight.

In Zanzibar, where the frasil was equivalent to 12 men, it weighed 16.166 kg.

== Sources ==
- How I Found Livingstone: Travels, Adventures and Discoveries in Central Africa: Including an Account of Four Months' Residence with Dr. Livingstone by Sir Henry Morton Stanley
- The Journal of the Royal Geographical Society, Volume 29 By Royal Geographical Society
- The Lake Regions of Central Africa: A Picture of Exploration By Sir Richard Francis Burton
