= Packhorse =

Horse, mule, donkey, or pony used to carry goods on its back

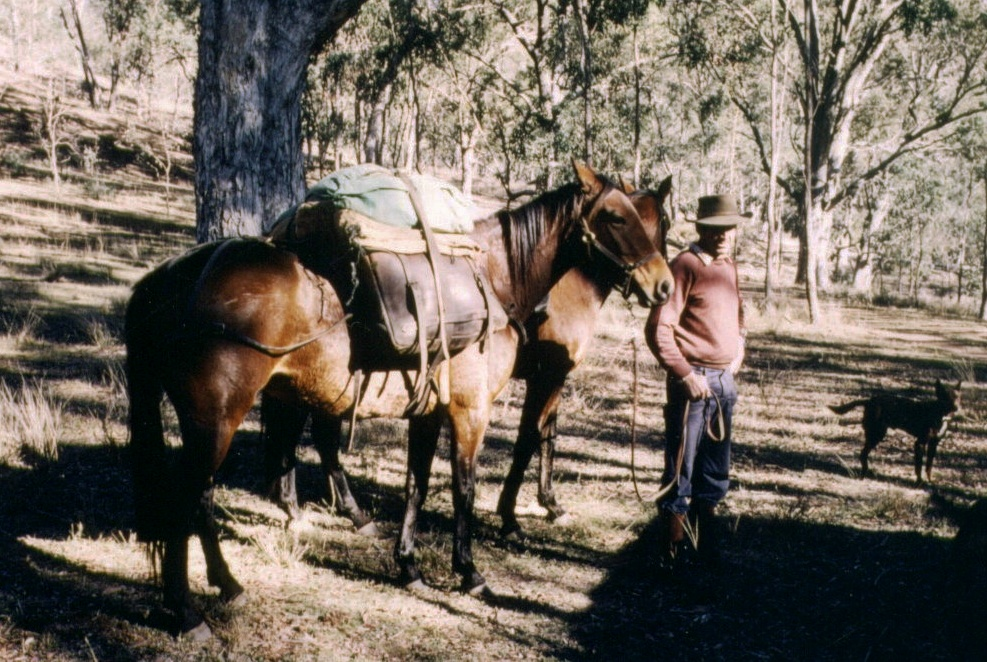
A stockman with a packhorse

A packhorse, pack horse, or sumpter is a horse, mule, donkey, or pony used to carry goods on its back, usually in sidebags or panniers. Typically packhorses are used to cross difficult terrain, where the absence of roads prevents the use of wheeled vehicles. Use of packhorses dates back to the Neolithic period. Today, westernized nations primarily use packhorses for recreational pursuits, but they are still an important part of everyday transportation of goods throughout much of the developing world and have some military uses in rugged regions.

== History ==
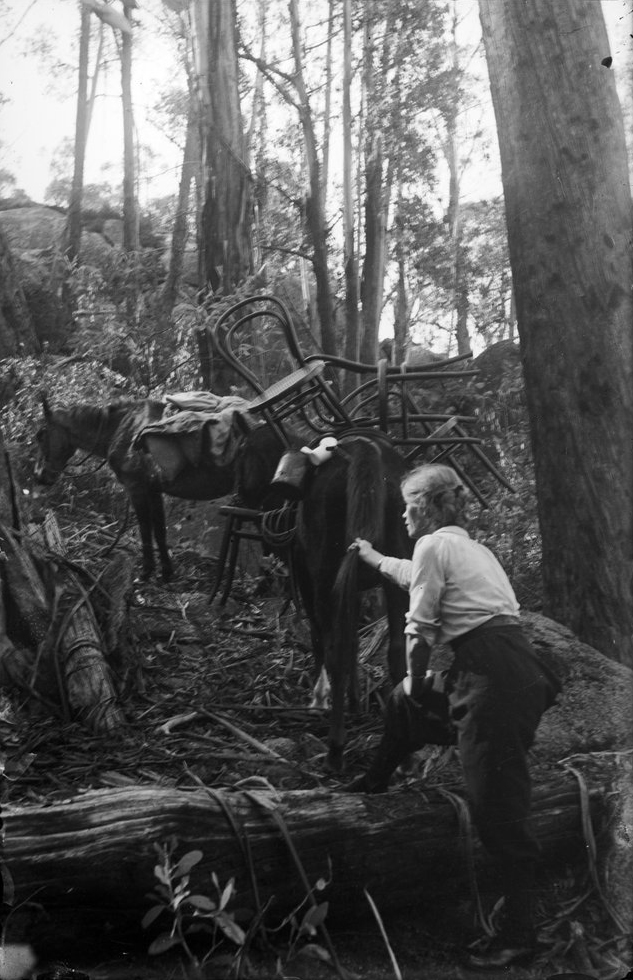
Mountain guide Alice Manfield using packhorses to carry wooden chairs up Mt Buffalo, c. 1912

Packhorses have been used since the earliest period of domestication of the horse. They were invaluable throughout antiquity, through the Middle Ages, and into modern times where roads are nonexistent or poorly maintained.

=== Historic use in England ===
Packhorses were heavily used to transport goods and minerals in England from medieval times until the construction of the first turnpike roads and canals in the 18th century. Many routes crossed the Pennines between Lancashire and Yorkshire, enabling salt, limestone, coal, fleeces and cloth to be transported.

Some routes had self-describing names, such as Limersgate and the Long Causeway; others were named after landmarks, such as the Reddyshore Scoutgate ("gate" is Old Norse for a road or way) and the Rapes Highway (after Rapes Hill). The medieval paths were marked by wayside crosses along their routes. Mount Cross, above the hamlet of Shore in the Cliviger Gorge, shows signs of Viking influence. As the Vikings moved eastwards from the Irish Sea in about 950 AD, it is likely that the pack horse routes were established from that time.

Most packhorses were Galloways, small, stocky horses named after the Scottish district where they were first bred. Those employed in the lime-carriage trade were known as "limegals". Each pony could carry about 240 pounds (110 kg) in weight, spread between two panniers. Typically a train of ponies would number between 12 and 20, but sometimes up to 40. They averaged about 25 miles (40 km) a day. The train's leader commonly wore a bell to warn of its approach, since contemporary accounts emphasised the risk packhorse trains presented to others. They were particularly useful as roads were muddy and often impassable by wagon or cart, and there were no bridges over some major rivers in the north of England.

About 1000 packhorses a day passed through Clitheroe before 1750, and "commonly 200 to 300 laden horses every day over the River Calder (at a ford) called Fennysford in the King's Highway between Clitheroe and Whalley". The importance of packhorse routes was reflected in jingles and rhymes, often aide-memoires of the routes.

As the need for cross-Pennine transport increased, the main routes were improved, often by laying stone setts parallel to the horse track, at a distance of a cartwheel. They remained difficult in poor weather — the Reddyshore Scoutgate was "notoriously difficult" — and became insufficient for a developing commercial and industrial economy. In the 18th century the first canals were built in England and, following the Turnpike Act 1773, metalled roads. They made the ancient packhorse routes obsolete. Away from main routes their use persisted into the 19th century, leaving a legacy of paths across wilderness areas called packhorse routes, roads or trails and distinctive narrow, low-sided stone-arched packhorse bridges, for example at Marsden near Huddersfield. The Packhorse is a common public house name throughout England. During the 19th century, horses that transported officers' baggage during military campaigns were referred to as "bathorses", from the French bat, meaning packsaddle.

=== Historic use in North America ===
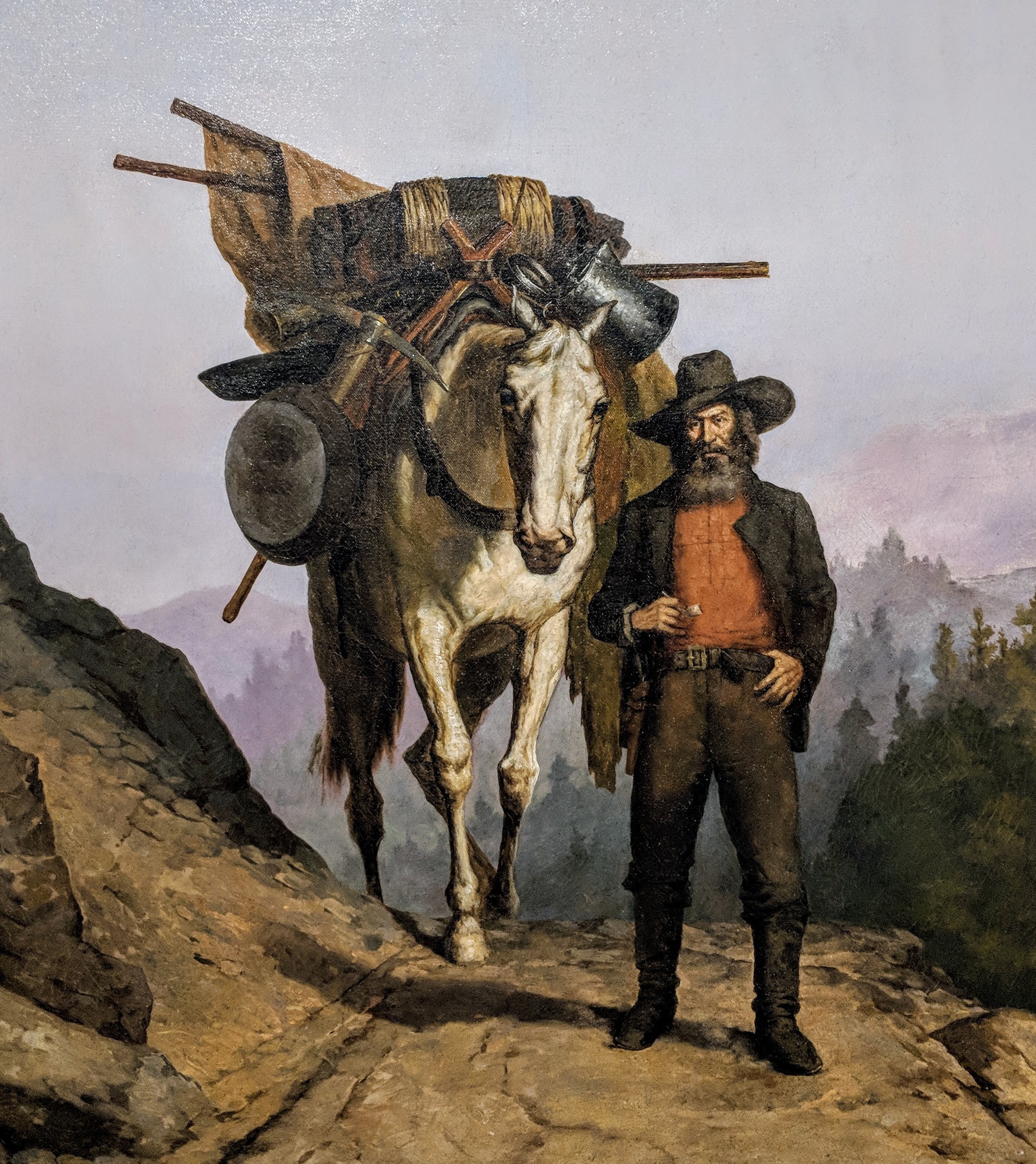
A miner with a packhorse during the California Gold Rush

The packhorse, mule or donkey was a critical tool in the development of the Americas. In colonial America, Spanish, French, Dutch and English traders made use of pack horses to carry goods to remote Native Americans and to carry hides back to colonial market centers. They had little choice, the Americas had virtually no improved waterways before the 1820s and roads in times before the automobile were only improved locally around a municipality, and only rarely in between. This meant cities and towns were connected by roads which carts and wagons could navigate only with difficulty, for virtually every eastern hill or mountain with a shallow gradient was flanked by valleys with stream cut gullies and ravines in their bottoms, as well as Cut bank formations, including escarpments. Even a small stream would have steep banks in normal terrains.

By the 1790s the Lehigh Coal & Navigation Company was shipping anthracite coal from Summit Hill, Pennsylvania, to cargo boats on the Lehigh River using pack trains in what may be the earliest commercial mining company in North America. Afterwards in 1818−1827 its new management built first the Lehigh Canal, then the Mauch Chunk & Summit Hill Railroad, North America's second oldest which used mule trains to return the five ton coal cars the four hour climb the nine miles back to the upper terminus. Mules rode the roller-coaster precursor on the down trip to the docks, stables and paddocks below. The same company, as did its many competitors made extensive use of sure footed pack mules and donkeys in coal mines, including in some cases measures to stable the animals below ground. These were often managed by 'mule boys', a pay-grade up and a step above a breaker boy in the society of the times.

As the nation expanded west, packhorses, singly or in a pack train of several animals, were used by early surveyors and explorers, most notably by fur trappers, "mountain men", and gold prospectors who covered great distances by themselves or in small groups. Packhorses were used by Native American people when traveling from place to place, and were also used by traders to carry goods to both Indian and White settlements. During a few decades of the 19th Century, enormous pack trains carried goods on the Old Spanish Trail from Santa Fe, New Mexico, west to California.

On current United States Geological Survey maps, many such trails continue to be labeled pack trail.

=== Other historic uses ===
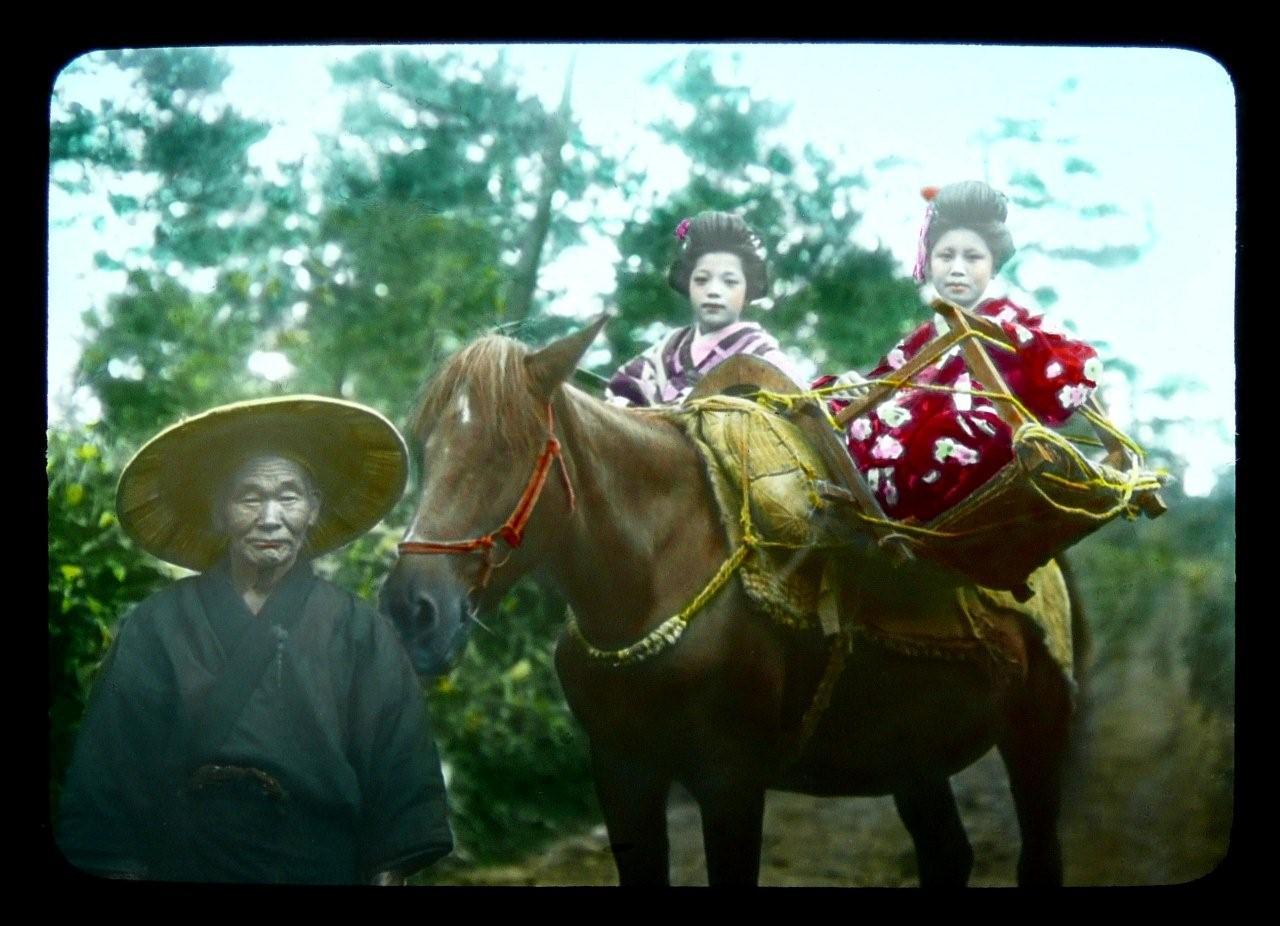
Japanese pack horse (ni-uma or konida-uma) carrying two girls as passengers, circa 1900–1929

Packhorses are used worldwide to convey many products. In feudal Japan riding in a saddle (kura) was reserved for the samurai class until the end of the samurai era (1868); lower classes would ride on a pack saddle (ni-gura or konida-gura) or bareback. Pack horses (ni-uma or konida-uma) carried a variety of merchandise and the baggage of travelers using a pack saddle that ranged from a basic wooden frame to the elaborate pack saddles used for the semi-annual processions (sankin kotai) of Daimyō. Pack horses also carried the equipment and food for samurai warriors during military campaigns.

== Modern uses ==
In North America and Australia, in areas such the Bicentennial National Trail, the packhorse plays a major role in recreational pursuits, particularly to transport goods and supplies into wilderness areas and where motor vehicles are either prohibited or impracticable. They are used by mounted outfitters, hunters, campers, stockmen and cowboys to carry tools and equipment that cannot be carried with the rider. They are used by guest ranches to transport materials to remote locations to set up campsites for tourists and guests. They are used by the United States Forest Service and the National Park Service to carry in supplies to maintain trails, cabins and bring in commercial goods to backcountry tourist lodges and other remote, permanent residences. Additionally, packhorses have also been used by drug trafficking organizations to transport narcotics across wilderness areas.

Australian National Horse Trail

In the third world packhorses, and donkeys to an even greater extent, still haul goods to market, carry supplies for workers and do many of the other jobs that have been performed for millennia.

In modern warfare, pack mules are used to bring supplies to areas where roads are poor and fuel supply is uncertain. For example they are a critical part of the supply chain for all sides of the conflict in remote parts of Afghanistan.

== Training and use ==
Foundation training of the packhorse is similar to that of a riding horse. Many but not all packhorses are also trained to be ridden. In addition, a packhorse is required to have additional skills that may not be required of a riding horse. A pack horse is required to be tolerant of close proximity to other animals in the packstring, both to the front and to the rear. The horse must also be tolerant of breeching, long ropes, noisy loads, and the shifting of the load during transit. Patience and tolerance are crucial; for example there are many ways to put pack horses into a pack string, but one method incorporates tying the halter lead of one animal to the tail of the animal in front of it, an act that often provokes kicking or bolting in untrained animals.

Loading of a packhorse requires care. Weight to be carried is the first factor to consider. The average horse can carry up to approximately 30% of its body weight. Thus a 1,000 pounds (450 kg) horse cannot carry more than 300 pounds (140 kg). A load carried by a packhorse also has to be balanced, with weight even on both sides to the greatest degree possible.

== See also ==
- Backpacking with animals
- Backpacking (hiking)
- Bicentennial National Trail
- Pack animal
- Pack saddle
- Guide
- Outfitter
- Pack Horse Library Project
