= Pack animal =

Individual or type of working animal used by humans

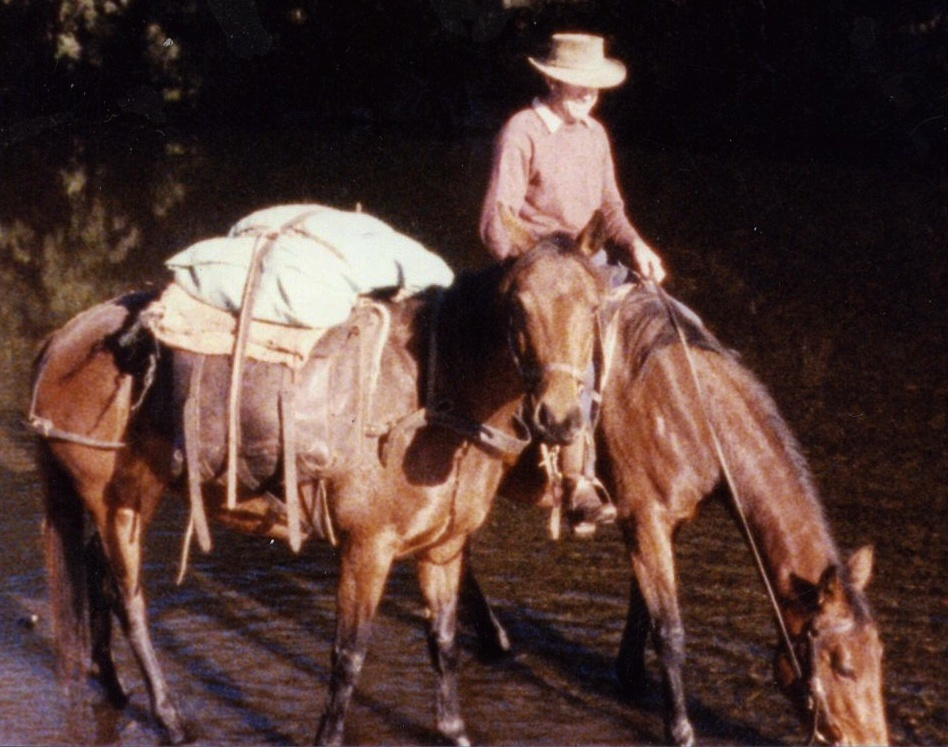
Horse packing with traditional Australian pack saddle

A pack animal, also known as a sumpter animal or beast of burden, is a working animal used to transport goods or materials by carrying them, usually on its back.

Domestic animals of many species are used in this way, among them alpacas, Bactrian camels, donkeys, dromedaries, gaur, goats, horses, llamas, mules, reindeer, water buffaloes and yaks.

== Diversity ==
Traditional pack animals include ungulates such as camels, the domestic yak, reindeer, goats, water buffaloes, and llama, and domesticated members of the horse family including horses, donkeys, and mules. Occasionally, dogs can be used to carry small loads.

=== Pack animals by region ===
- Arctic – reindeer and sled dogs
- Central Africa and Southern Africa – oxen, mules, donkeys
- Eurasia – donkeys, oxen, horses, mules
  - Central Asia – Bactrian camels, yaks, horses, mules, donkeys
  - South and Southeast Asia – water buffaloes, yaks, Asian elephants
- North America – horses, mules, donkeys, goats
- North Africa and Middle East – dromedaries, horses, donkeys, mules, oxen
- Oceania – donkeys, horses, dromedaries, mules, oxen
- South America – llamas, donkeys, mules
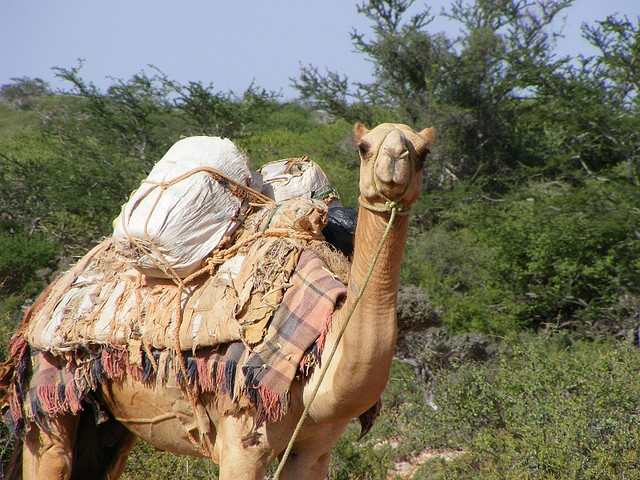
A nomad's pack camel in Eyl, Somalia

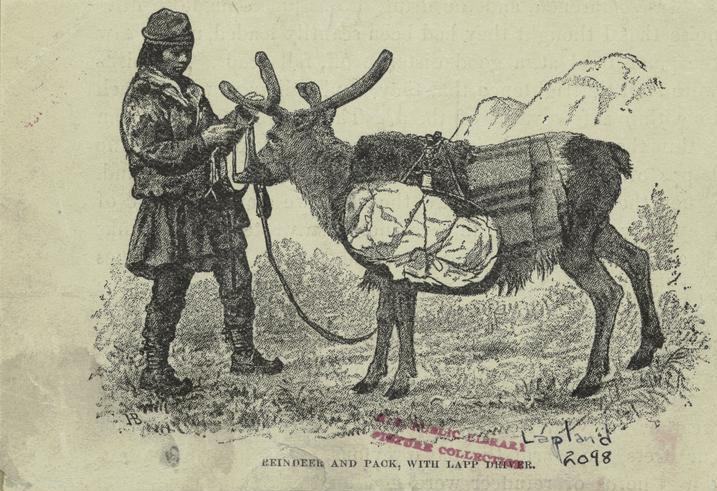
Pack reindeer with Sami driver from The land of the midnight sun, c. 1881

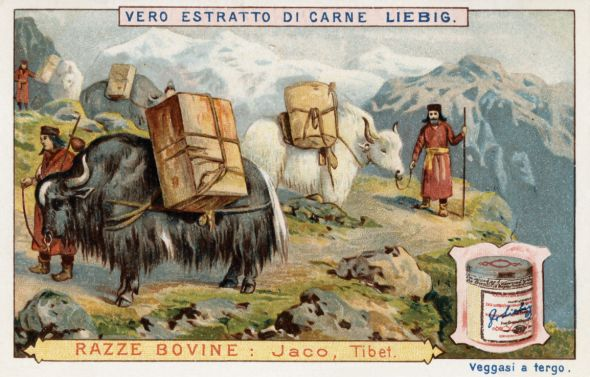
1900 advertisement showing pack yaks in Tibet

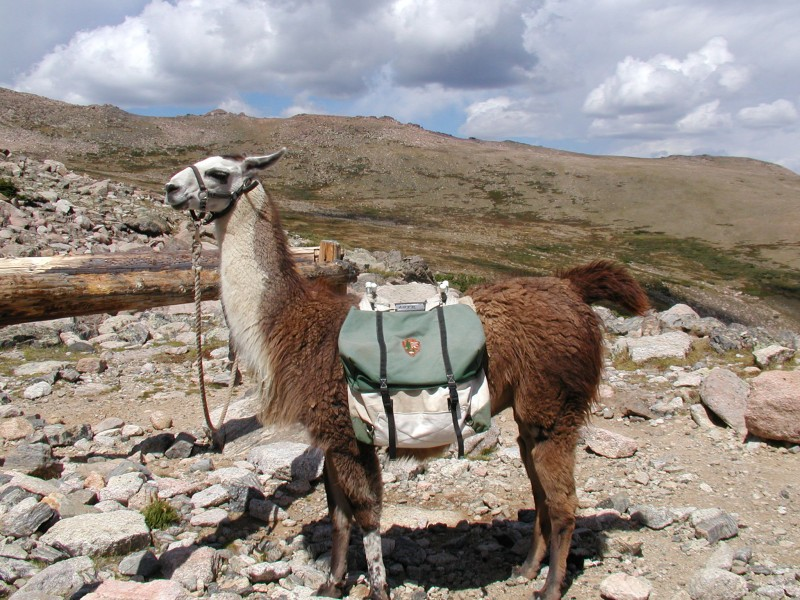
Pack llama, Rocky Mountain National Park, Colorado

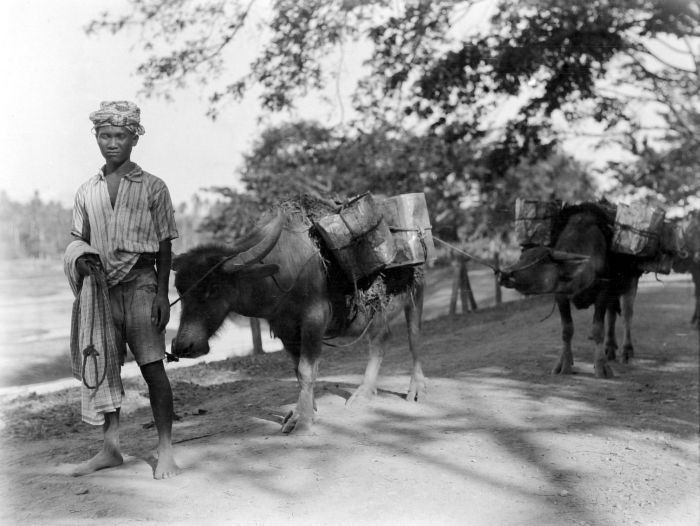
Pack water buffalo, Sumbawa, Indonesia, early 20th century

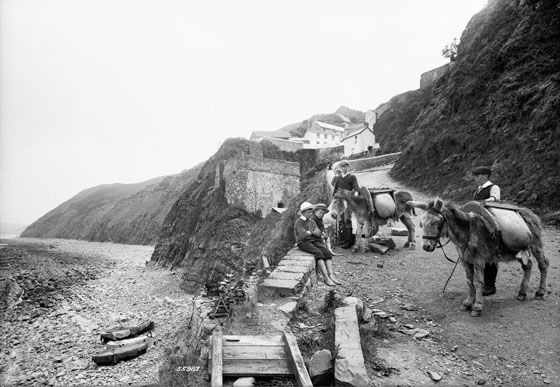
Pack donkeys, Devon, England, c. 1906

== Uses ==
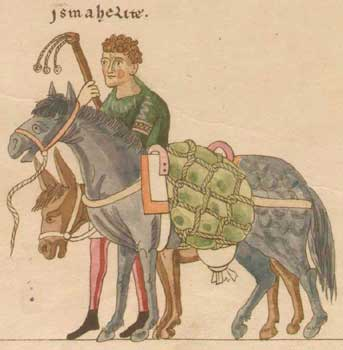
Medieval pack horse and donkey in Hortus Deliciarum, Europe, 12th century, when packing was a major means of transport of goods

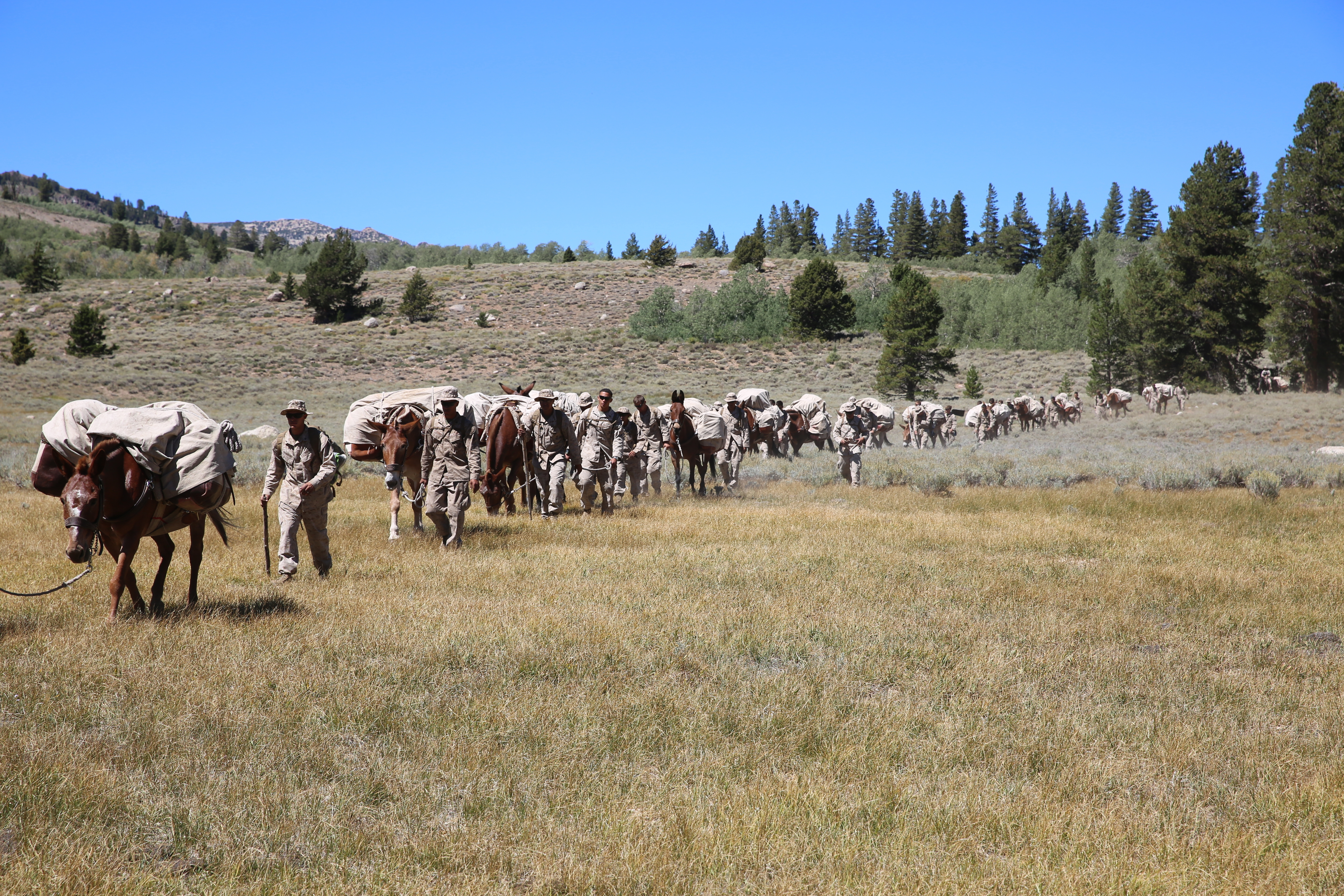
US Marines training in resupply with pack mules. Bridgeport, California, 2014

Hauling of goods in wagons with horses and oxen gradually displaced the use of packhorses, which had been important until the Middle Ages, by the sixteenth century.

Pack animals may be fitted with pack saddles and may also carry saddlebags. Alternatively, a pair of weighted materials (often placed symmetrically) are called panniers.

While traditional usage of pack animals by nomadic tribespeople is declining, a new market is growing in the tourist expeditions industry in regions such as the High Atlas mountains of Morocco, allowing visitors the comfort of backpacking with animals. The use of pack animals "is considered a valid means of viewing and experiencing" some National Parks in America, subject to guidelines and closed areas.

In the 21st century, special forces have received guidance on the use of horses, mules, llamas, camels, dogs, and elephants as pack animals.

=== Load carrying capacity ===
The maximum load for a camel is roughly 300 kg (660 lb).

Yaks are loaded differently according to region. In Sichuan, 75 kilograms (165 lb) is carried for 30 km (19 mi) in 6 hours. In Qinghai, at 4,100 m (13,500 ft) altitude, packs of up to 300 kilograms (660 lb) are routinely carried, while up to 390 kilograms (860 lb) is carried by the heaviest steers for short periods.

Llamas can carry roughly a quarter of their body weight, so an adult male of 200 kilograms (440 lb) can carry some 50 kilograms (110 lb).

Loads for equids are disputed. The US Army specifies a maximum of 20 percent of body weight for mules walking up to 32 km (20 mi) a day in mountains, giving a load of up to about 91 kilograms (200 lb). However an 1867 text mentioned a load of up to 360 kilograms (800 lb). In India, the prevention of cruelty rules (1965) limit mules to 200 kilograms (440 lb) and ponies to 70 kilograms (150 lb).

Reindeer can carry up to 40 kg (88 lb) for a prolonged period in mountains.

== See also ==
- Pack station
- Camel train
- Arriero
