= Pack goat =

Beast of burden

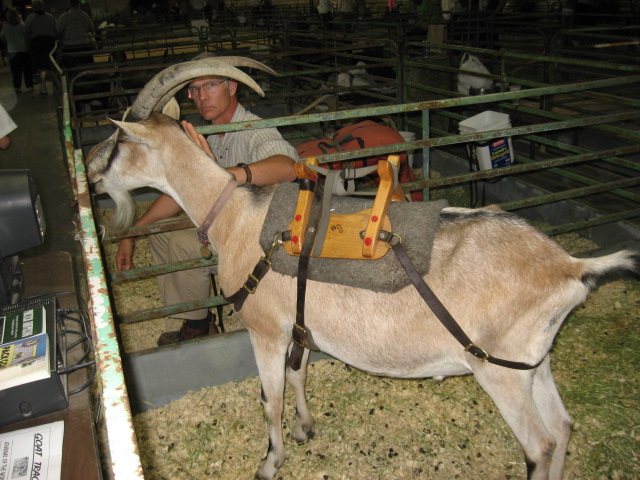
A goat wearing a packing harness

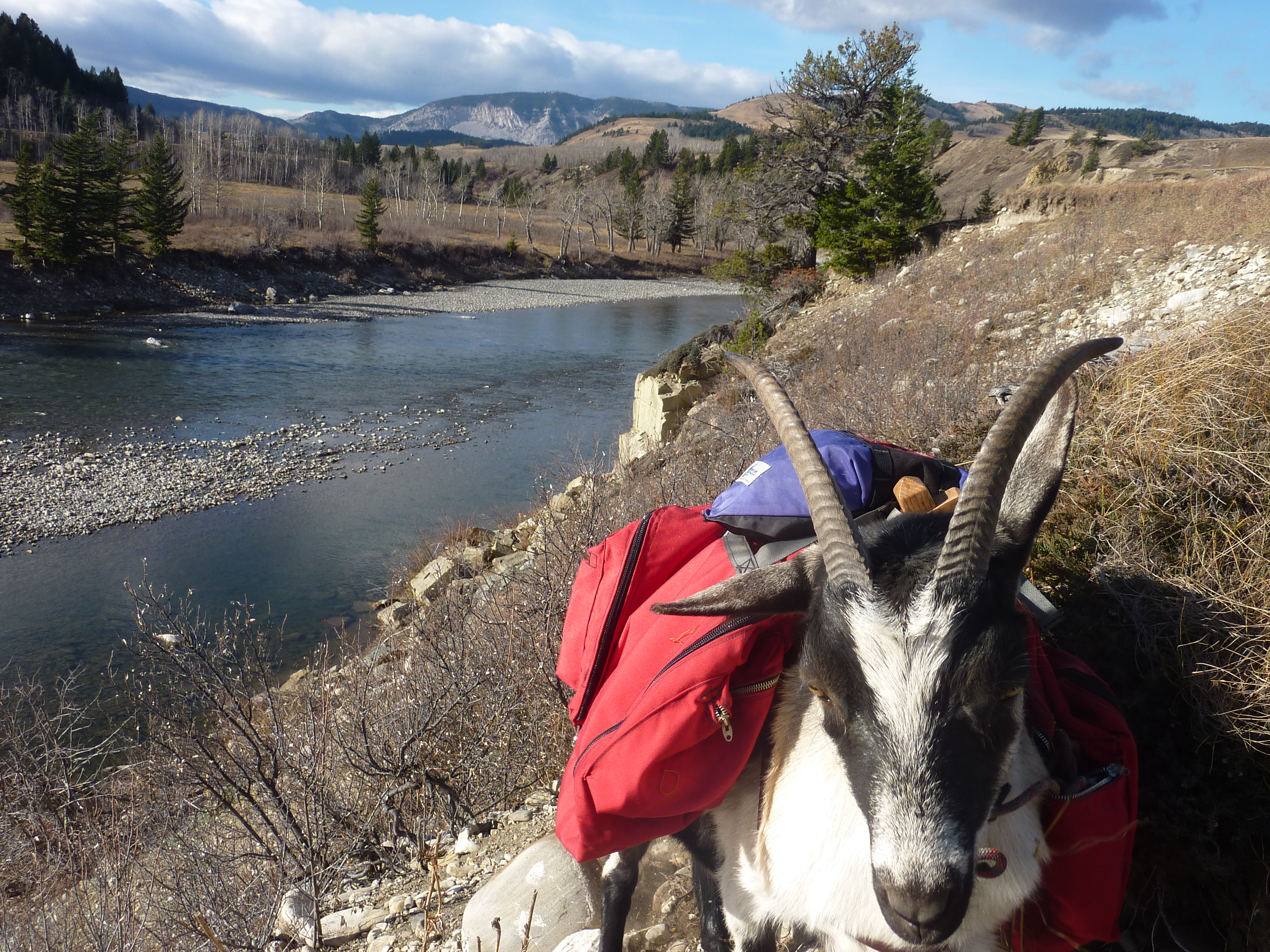
Pack goat in southern Alberta, Canada

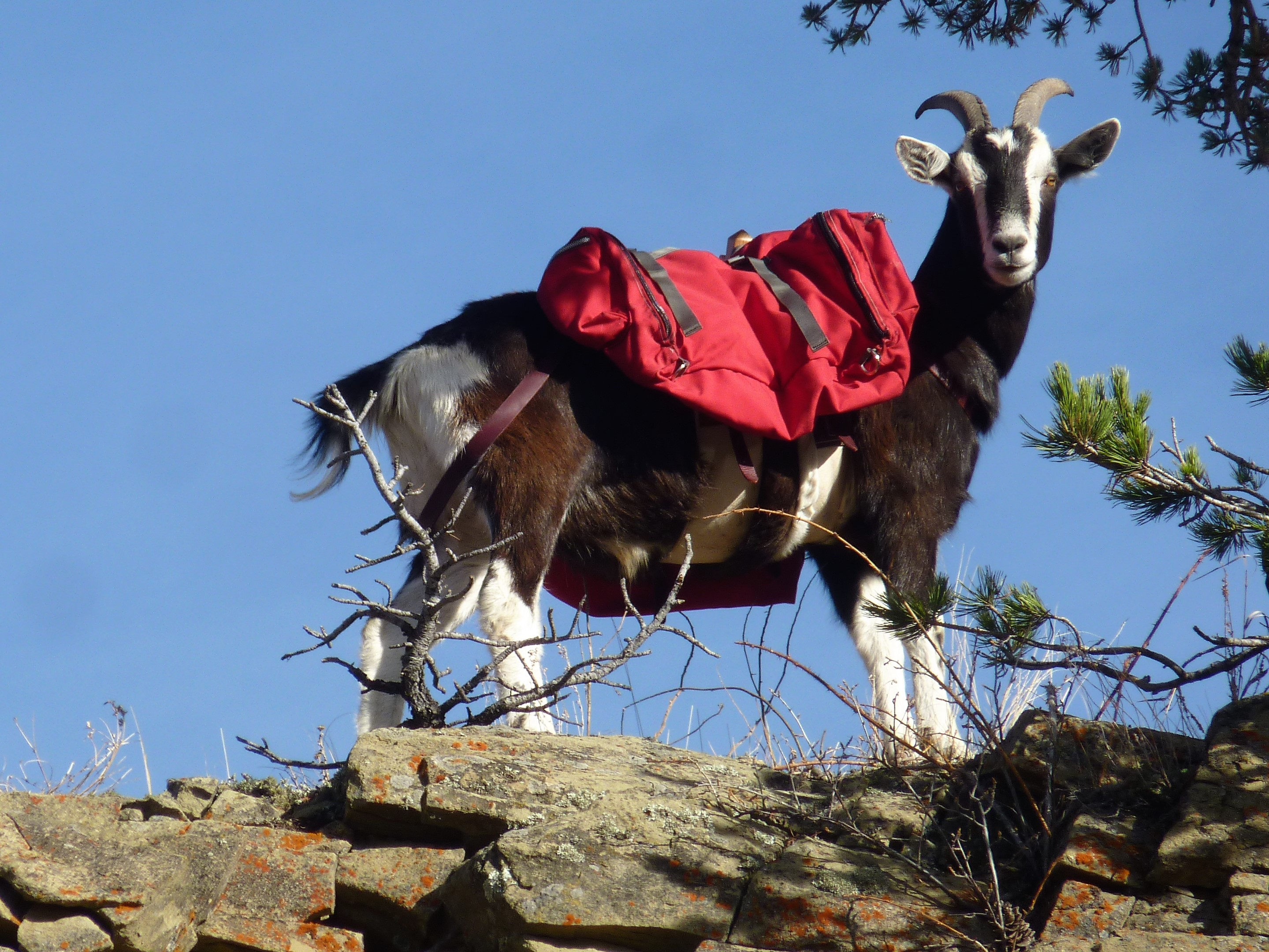
Pack goat

A pack goat is a goat used as a beast of burden, for packing cargo. Generally, large wether (castrated buck) goats are used for packing, though does may also be packed. While does are generally smaller and therefore able to carry somewhat less cargo, they may also provide fresh milk.

Goats are domesticated herd animals. They will usually stay near camp and follow their human masters on the trail, much as dogs will, without having to be leashed or tethered. They are generally used in wilderness camping settings.

A healthy and fit pack goat can carry up to 25 percent of its weight and walk up to about 19 km (12 mi) per day depending on its load weight, the terrain, and the animal's conditioning. They are generally less expensive to own and operate than other pack animals since they are natural browsing animals and can feed themselves along the way.

== In antiquity ==
Goats could be used as draft animals to pull light loads, even if oxen were preferred for heavy loads. Various artistic depictions of goats used as pack animals exist from the Greco-Roman classical era, although some of these may be more fanciful than realistic, such as a painting at the House of the Vettii showing Dionysus and Cupid drawn on a cart by a pair of goats. Similarly, a sarcophagus of a Roman noble shows a child in a chariot pulled by a goat.

== In the United States ==
The North American Packgoat Association is a Boise, Idaho-based not-for-profit corporation formed to promote packing with packgoats. In the U.S., goats bred for packing are usually tall and lean; belonging to one of the larger dairy goat breeds such as Alpine, Toggenburg, Saanen, Lamancha, Oberhasli or a crossbreed thereof. However, any type of goat can be trained to pack. Craftspeople and enthusiasts in the U.S design and build specialized goat packing equipment, publish newsletters and raise pack goats for personal use and sale.

Goat packing is popular with both young families, and older individuals who want to be able to go into the wilderness and need help carrying all their gear. Some public lands require permits for the use of goats as pack animals. Concerns have been raised about the disease-spreading potential that domestic goats may pose to wild animals, such as mountain sheep and mountain goats. Accordingly, the use of pack goats is restricted in certain areas.

Goat packing was popularized in the U.S. in the 1980s and 1990s by John Mionczynski of Atlantic City, Wyoming. He developed a herd of large mixed-breed goats and used them as early as the 1970s to pack supplies for scientists working in the mountains and later to carry food and gear for tourists on hiking trips. He designed and built customized pack saddles and saddlebags and, with illustrator Hannah Hinchman, published a book, The Pack Goat, in 1992.

== See also ==
- Backpacking with animals
