= Pack saddle =

Device which permits heavy loads to be placed on the back of working animals

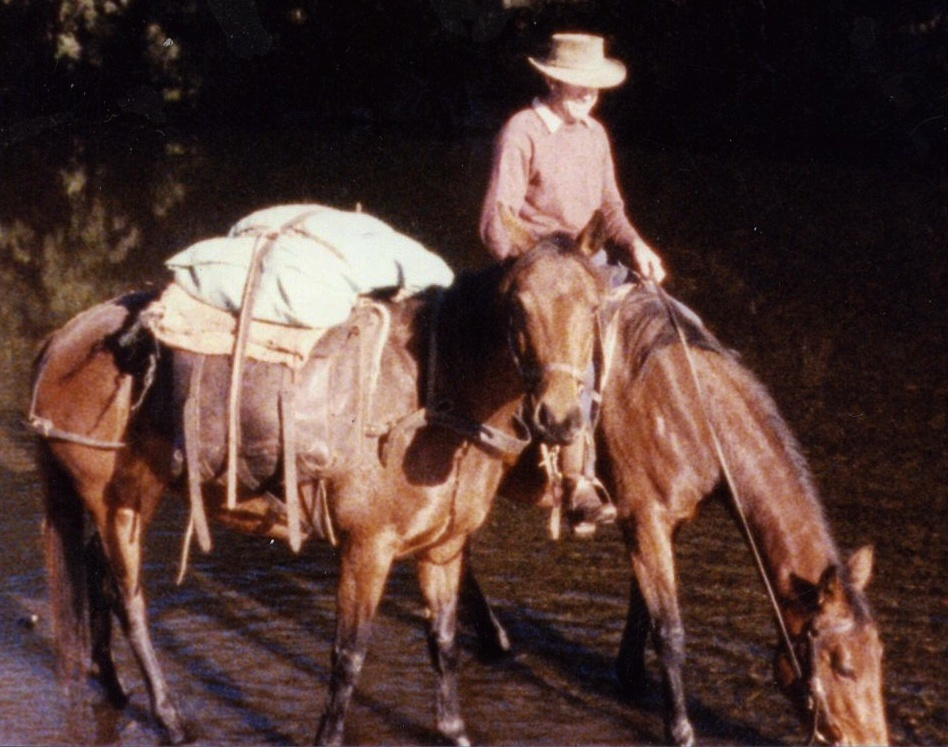
Military style pack saddle with a swag (bedding) on top

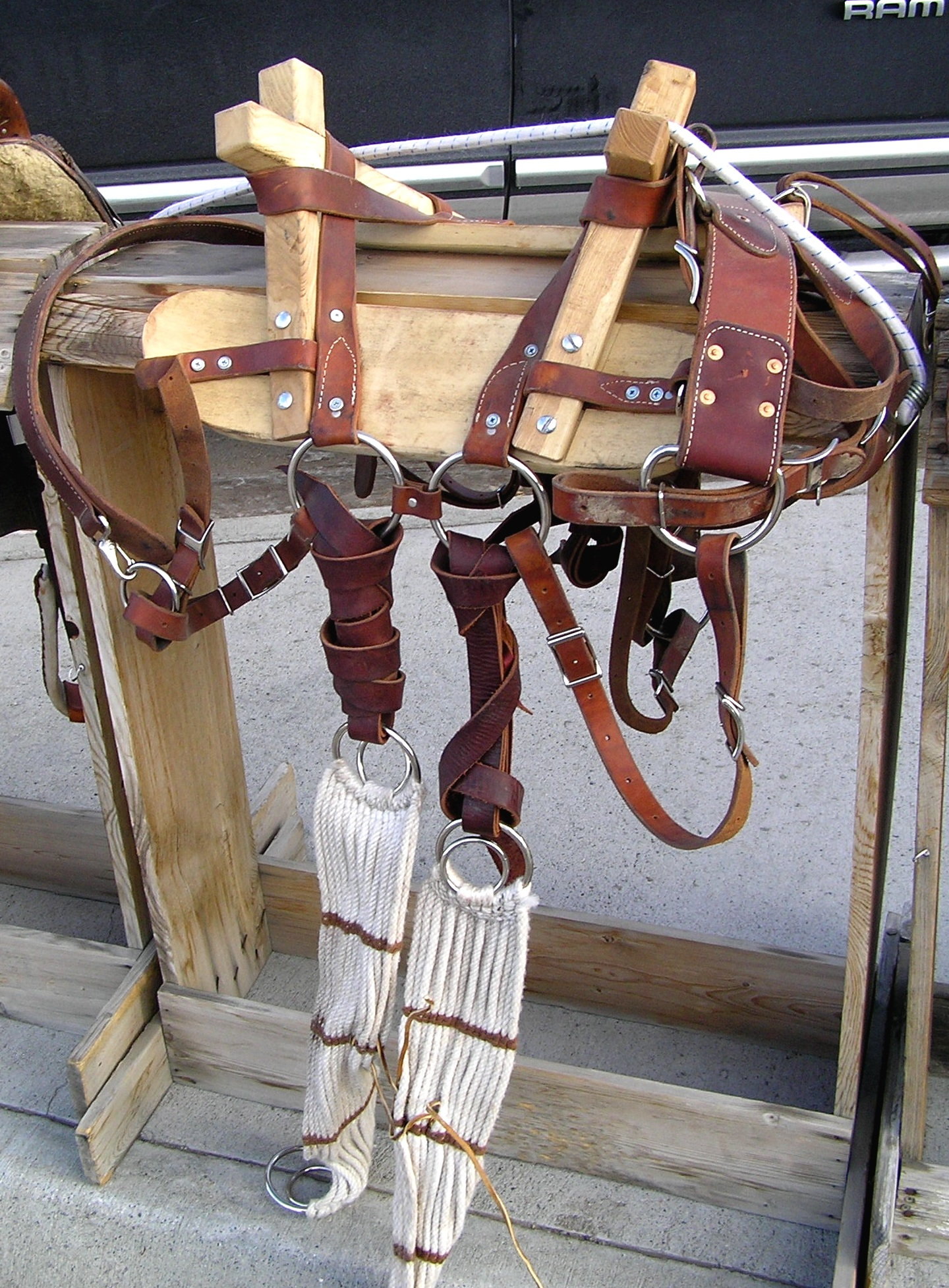
The Sawbuck pack saddle, traditionally used in the western United States

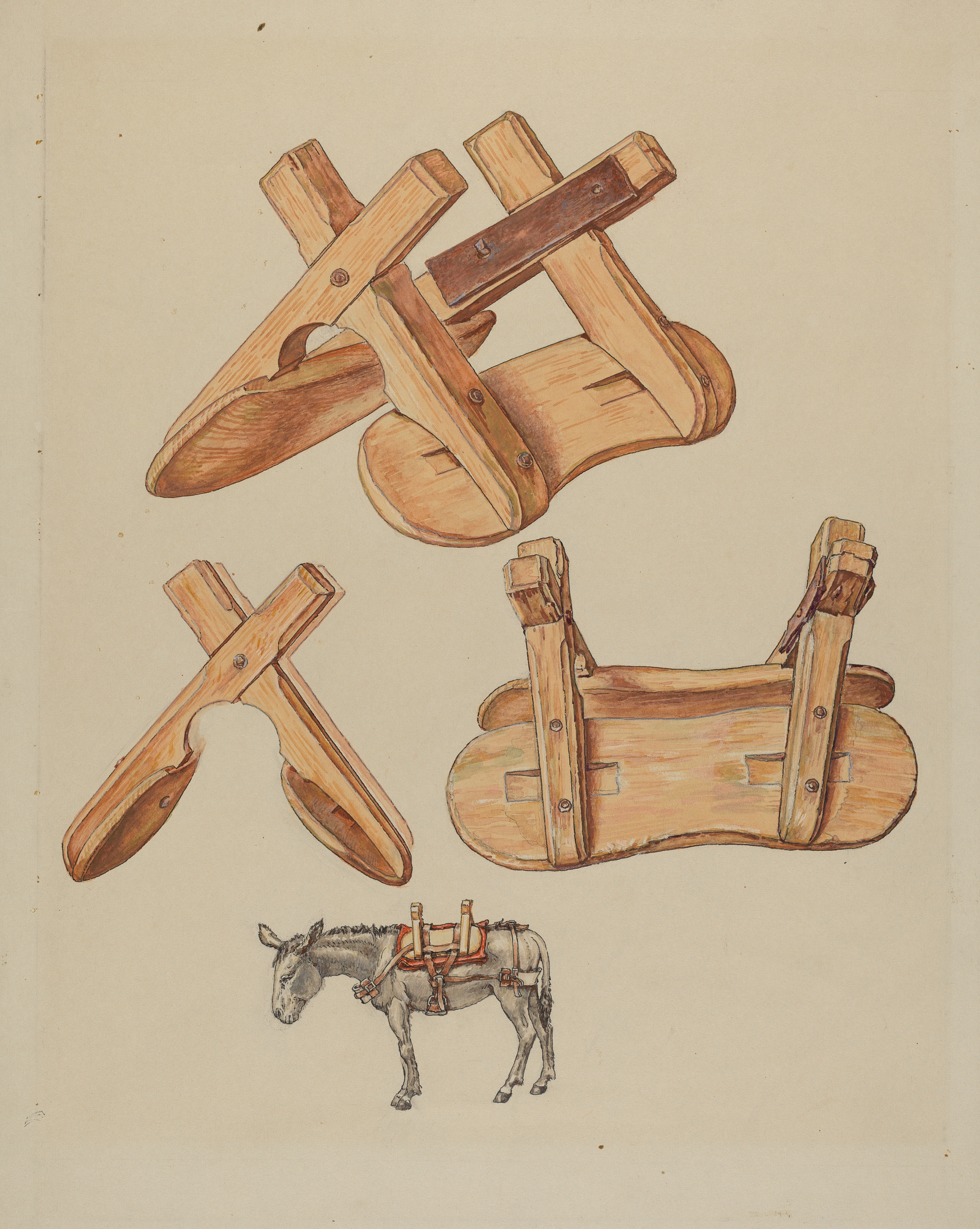
American 20th Century, Unrigged Pack Saddle, c. 1932, National Gallery of Art

A pack saddle is any device designed to be secured on the back of a horse, mule, or other working animal so that it can carry heavy loads such as luggage, firewood, small cannons, or other things too heavy to be carried by humans.

== Description ==
Ideally the pack saddle rests on a saddle blanket or saddle pad to spread the weight of the saddle and its burden on the pack animal's back. The underside of the pack saddle is designed to conform well to the shape of the pack animal's back. It is typically divided into two symmetrical parts separated by a gap at the top to ensure that the weight being carried does not rest on the draft animal's backbone and to provide good ventilation to promote the evaporation of sweat.

The pack saddle consists of a tree, or the wooden blocks that sit on the horse's back, the half breed which is the canvas saddle cover, the breeching and often a crupper which prevents the loaded saddle from sliding too far forward and the breast collar, which holds the loaded saddle from sliding too far back on the packhorse or mule. The flexible bars on this packsaddle adjust to a horse's back and offer several options for hanging panniers, manties (packs wrapped in canvas), or other loads.

There are many types of pack saddle:

- Crossbuck / Sawbuck pack saddle has crossed wooden bars to attach sling ropes.
- Otago pack saddle, known in military use as the British universal pack saddle, is a rideable pack saddle with two large cushioning pads to prevent injury to the animal and large hooks on each side of the metal pommel and cantle arches for hanging pack bags or crates.
- Decker pack saddle has two rings for tying sling ropes.

The modern pack saddle is usually not intended to support a human rider. The upper side of the pack saddle resembles a rack to let its load rest on and be tied on with ropes, straps, a surcingle, or other devices. One historical exception was a pack saddle used in feudal Japan by non-samurai commoners, who were not allowed to use riding saddles (kura) for transportation.

== See also ==
- Backpacking with animals
- Packhorse
- Saddle
- SCR-203 pack radio
- Trail riding
