= Gallwitz =

Gallwitz is a surname. Notable people with the surname include:

- Erich Gallwitz (1912-1981), Austrian cross-country skier
- Karl Gallwitz (1895-1984), German World War I flying ace
- Max von Gallwitz (1852-1937), German general and politician
- Valeska von Gallwitz (1833-1888), German writer
