= New Zealand land confiscations =

1860s New Zealand political event

The New Zealand land confiscations took place during the 1860s to punish the Kīngitanga movement for attempting to set up an alternative Māori form of government that forbade the selling of land to European settlers. The confiscation law targeted Kīngitanga Māori against whom the government had waged war to impose the rule of British law. More than 1,200,000 hectares (3,000,000 acres) or 4.4 percent of land were confiscated, mainly in Waikato, Taranaki and the Bay of Plenty, but also in South Auckland, Hauraki, Te Urewera, Hawke's Bay and the East Coast.

Legislation for the confiscations was contained in the New Zealand Settlements Act 1863, which provided for the seizing of land from Māori tribes who had been in rebellion against the government after 1 January 1863. Its stated purpose was to achieve the "permanent protection and security" of the country's inhabitants and establish law, order and peace by using areas within the confiscated land to establish settlements for colonisation, populated initially by military settlers enlisted from among gold miners at Otago and the Colony of Victoria (Australia). Land not used by for military settlers would be surveyed and laid out as towns and rural allotments and then sold, with the money raised to be used to repay the expenses of fighting Māori. According to academic Dr Ranginui Walker, this provided the ultimate irony for Māori who were fighting to defend their own land from European encroachment: "They were to pay for the settlement and development of their lands by its expropriation in a war for the extension of the Crown's sovereignty into their territory."

Although the legislation was ostensibly aimed at Māori tribes engaged in armed conflict with the government, the confiscations showed little distinction between "loyal" and "rebel" Māori tribes, and effectively robbed most Māori in the affected areas of their land and livelihood. The parliamentary debate of the legislation suggests that although the confiscation policy was purportedly designed to restore and preserve peace, some government ministers at the time saw its main purpose to be the acceleration and financing of colonisation. Much of the land that was never occupied by settlers was later sold by the Crown. Māori anger and frustration over the land confiscations led to the rise of the messianic Hauhau movement of the Pai Mārire religion from 1864 and the outbreak of the Second Taranaki War and Tītokowaru's War throughout Taranaki between 1863 and 1869. Some land was later returned to Māori, although not always to its original owners. Some returned areas were then purchased by the Crown.

Several claims have been lodged with both the Waitangi Tribunal and the New Zealand Government since the 1990s seeking compensation for confiscations enacted under the Land Settlement Act. The tribunal, in its reports on its investigations, has concluded that although the land confiscation legislation was legal, every confiscation by the government breached the law, by both failing to provide sufficient evidence there was rebellion within the designated areas and also including vast areas of land, such as uninhabitable mountain areas, which there was no prospect of settling. Submissions by the Crown in the 1999 Ngāti Awa investigation and a 1995 settlement with Waikato-Tainui included an acknowledgement that confiscations from that tribe were unjust and a breach of the Treaty of Waitangi. Ten deeds of settlement were signed by the Crown and iwi in 2012, concluding with a $6.7 million redress package to a Waikato River iwi for "breaches of the Treaty of Waitangi that left the tribe virtually landless".

== Background to legislation ==
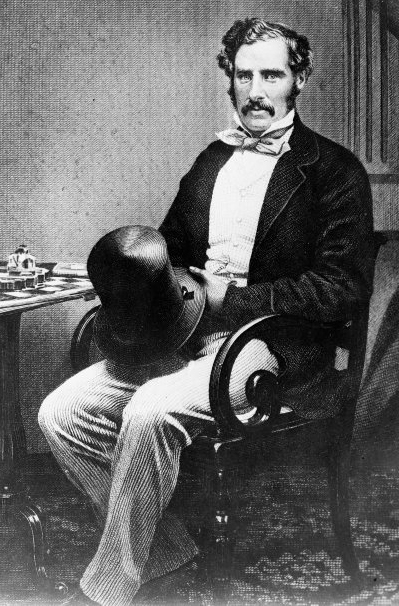
Sir George Grey

Since the outbreak of the First Taranaki War at Waitara in March 1860, the New Zealand Government had been engaged in armed conflict with Māori who refused to sell their land for colonial settlement or surrender the "undisturbed possession of their lands and estates" the 1840 Treaty of Waitangi had promised them. By mid-1863 the costs of fighting the war were continuing to mount – in 1861–62 the colonial defence vote was £8031, while the British Government spent about £400,000 – and the government still found itself unable to quash Māori resistance.

In May 1863, weeks before the outbreak of the Second Taranaki War, Charles Brown, the Superintendent of Taranaki, wrote: "It would be rightful to confiscate from the tribes which should fight against us, territories of sufficient value to cover fully all the cost of the war." Three days later Governor Sir George Grey and his ministers signed an agreement that a disputed block of land between Tataraimaka and Omata in Taranaki would be confiscated and Waitara Māori hostile to the government were warned they also risked confiscation of their land.

Premier Alfred Domett's ministry immediately began expanding their plans for mass confiscations. In June the ministry was planning a line of defence posts between Auckland and Ngāruawāhia, clearing "all hostile natives" north of the line and confiscating their land, which would then be either given to military settlers or sold to defray the costs of war. The government published notices of the terms for granting land in the Omata area to military settlers in July, and a month later for land in the Waikato area, even though no legislation for the confiscations yet existed.

In August 1863, just three weeks after the invasion of the Waikato began, Attorney-General Frederick Whitaker and Defence Minister Thomas Russell sent Governor Grey a memorandum signed by Premier Alfred Domett, claiming that the Waikato, the most powerful Māori tribe, was planning to drive out or destroy Europeans and establish a native kingdom. They argued that the security of the colony demanded that Māori aggression needed to be punished and proposed that an armed population be recruited from the goldfields of Otago and Australia and settled on land taken from the "enemy". Whitaker and Russell, leading Auckland financiers, speculators and lawyers, were the most powerful men in the ministry and stood to make a substantial fortune if Māori south of Auckland could be moved from their land. Grey, who had recently returned from a term as Governor of the Cape Colony in South Africa, where the military settlement of Xhosa land had been undertaken, embraced the idea and in a dispatch to the Colonial Office a month later set out details of the plan, repeating the claim that Māori planned the wholesale destruction of some European settlements. The proposal was to place 5000 military settlers on the Waikato and Taranaki frontiers, each holding a 20 hectare farm on military tenure.

Grey attempted to allay potential misgivings in the Colonial Office by pointing out that there were only 3355 Māori living on 200,000 hectares of fertile land in the Waikato, and of this they had cultivated just 6000 hectares. He proposed making roads throughout the land to link the military settlements and towns and estimated the entire cost to be £3.5 million. The funds would be raised with a loan from the Bank of New Zealand, which Defence Minister Russell had founded, and from which both he and Attorney-General Whitaker hoped to profit. Security for the loan would be provided by the profits expected from the sale of confiscated land to new immigrants.

By October the scheme had grown again, with the number of military settlers in Taranaki, Waikato and other areas now pegged at 20,000, with settlements linked by 1600 km of roads. In Taranaki alone, 8000 military settlers would be spread across 40 settlements stretching across 80,000 hectares from Waitara to Waitotara, near Wanganui.

== Legislation and debate ==
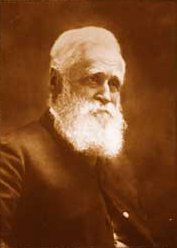
Sir William Fox

The New Zealand Settlements Bill was introduced into the House of Representatives on 5 November 1863, attracting little debate and only two votes against it in each of the Lower and Upper Houses before it became law. The bill was introduced by the Native Minister, Sir William Fox, who said its primary purpose was to suppress the "present rebellion". The word "confiscation" did not appear in the legislation. The minister conceded that land of Māori who were not "in rebellion" could also be confiscated, but said they would be entitled to compensation through a Compensation Court.

=== Legislation ===
The preamble to the act noted that the North Island had "been subject to insurrections amongst the evil-disposed persons of the Native race to the great injury alarm and intimidation of Her Majesty's peaceable subjects of both races and involving great losses of life and expenditure of money in their suppression". It continued: "Many outrages upon lives and property have recently been committed and such outrages are still threatened and of almost daily occurrence ... A large number of the Inhabitants of several districts of the Colony have entered into combinations and taken up arms with the object of attempting the extermination or expulsion of the European settlers and are now engaged in open rebellion against Her Majesty's authority."

The preamble said adequate provision should be made "for the permanent protection and security of the well-disposed Inhabitants of both races for the prevention of future insurrection or rebellion and for the establishment and maintenance of Her Majesty's authority and of Law and Order throughout the Colony ...the best and most effectual means of attaining those ends would be by the introduction of a sufficient number of settlers able to protect themselves and to preserve the peace of the Country."

The act gave the Governor power to declare "as a District within the provisions of this Act", any land which was owned or used by a tribe, or part of a tribe, which he was satisfied had "been engaged in rebellion against her Majesty's authority" since 1 January 1863. The Governor could then set apart any land within these districts for "settlements for colonisation". All such land was automatically deemed to be discharged from all title interest or claim of any person.

Compensation would be granted to those who claimed a title to it as long as they had not waged war or carried arms against the Crown or government forces, or given assistance or comfort to anyone who had done so. Claims for compensation would be considered by Compensation Courts established under the act, with the judges to be appointed by the Governor.

The Governor would cause to be laid out a "sufficient number of towns and farms", contracts would be made with "certain persons for the granting of land to them respectively in return for Military Service", and remaining land would be surveyed and laid out as towns and suburban and rural allotments. Money raised from the sale of land would be directed towards the repayment of the expenses of "suppressing the present insurrection" as well as providing any compensation awarded.

=== Parliamentary debate ===
Despite Māori making up a third of New Zealand's population, the Parliament had no Māori members. In the House of Representatives, only two MPs spoke in the debate on the bill. G. Brodie supported it in a brief speech and James FitzGerald, in a lengthy attack, argued that the bill was contrary to the Treaty of Waitangi, and that confiscation would "drive every (Māori) into a state of hopeless rebellion ... be they friends or be they foes".

In the Legislative Council Whitaker introduced the bill, contending that by their rebellion, Māori had violated the Treaty of Waitangi, thereby discharging the Crown "from all obligation" under the Treaty. Former Attorney-General William Swainson opposed the legislation, claiming it was in breach of both the treaty and the New Zealand Constitution Act. He said the Crown could not, "with honour and good faith, seize the land of peaceable Māori subjects (those who were not in rebellion) without their consent". Dr Daniel Pollen, a former Superintendent of Auckland and Commissioner of Crown Lands, supported the bill, but said the government should take "not one acre more" than was necessary for military settlements. He described the legislation as immoral, claiming it was "in fact a Bill for the confiscation of Native lands of the province, that object being veiled by a specious form of words". He predicted that confiscation and military settlement would lead to a war of extermination.

=== Public debate ===
Confiscation was promoted by the press and many settlers because of its potential to provide cheap land and repay the cost of fighting the land wars. The Southern Cross newspaper condemned the conduct of the "blood-thirsty murderers" in the Waikato and declared: "There is only one way of meeting this, and that is by confiscation and the sword ... the natives have forced it upon us ... At the very least large tracts of their lands must be the penalty."

Retired chief justice Sir William Martin was one of the few in New Zealand who publicly opposed confiscation. He wrote: "The example of Ireland may satisfy us how little is to be effected towards the quieting of a country by the confiscation of private land; how the claim of the dispossessed owner is remembered from generation to generation, and how the brooding sense of wrong breaks out from time to time in fresh disturbance and crime."

In Britain, the Aborigines Protection Society also protested, with a statement noting: "We can conceive of no surer means of adding fuel to the flame of War; of extending the area of disaffection; and of making the Natives fight with the madness of despair, than a policy of confiscation. It could not fail to produce in New Zealand the same bitter fruits of which it has yielded so plentiful a harvest in other countries, where the strife of races has perpetuated through successive generations."

=== Colonial Office response ===
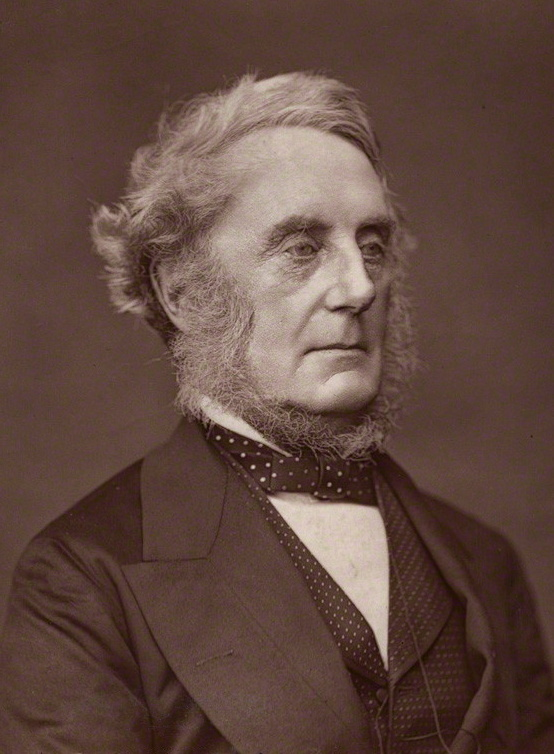
Edward Cardwell

Governor Grey assented to the bill on 3 December 1863 and, because the Queen was empowered to still disallow the act, a month later sent a copy of it to the Secretary of State for the Colonies, Duke of Newcastle, claiming he had agreed reluctantly with the principle. The Duke was replaced in April 1864 by Edward Cardwell, who wrote back to Grey expressing several objections to the law – it could be applied to Māori in any part of the North Island; it allowed unlimited confiscation; some could be dispossessed without having been engaged in rebellion; and decisions could be made in secret without argument or appeal – and suggested the powers of the act be limited to two years and that an independent commission be appointed to determine the lands to be confiscated. He noted that the act allowed "great abuse" and needed to be controlled with a strong hand, recognising that it could prolong rather than terminate war. He urged the Governor to withhold his permission to any confiscation if he was not satisfied it was "just and moderate".

Cardwell offered his own warning of the possible consequences of excessive confiscation: "The original power, the Maori, (would) be driven back to the forest and morass (and) the sense of injustice, combined with the pressure of want, would convert the native population into a desperate banditti, taking refuge in the solitudes of the interior from the pursuit of the police or military, and descending, when opportunity might occur, into the cultivated plain to destroy the peaceful fruits of industry." Despite his reservations, Cardwell opted not to disallow the act and later passed on an opinion of Crown law officers that it was not repugnant to the laws of England.

== Confiscations begin ==
=== Taranaki ===
More than a year passed before Grey, who appeared to be involved in a power struggle with government ministers, issued his first proclamation to confiscate land. Within that time, however, Parliament also passed the Public Works Act 1864. which allowed Māori land to be taken for public works – initially, a road between Wanganui and New Plymouth. (In 1865 the Outlying Districts Police Act also came into force, enabling more land to be forfeited when chiefs failed to surrender fugitives).

On 30 January 1865, Grey issued a proclamation to seize the middle Taranaki district, between the Waitara River and the Waimate Stream. Separate proclamations identified Waitara South and Oakura as confiscated districts. On 2 September he issued further proclamations, embracing the Ngati Awa and Ngati Ruanui districts, effectively seizing all of Taranaki from Parinihi to Wanganui and beyond Mt Taranaki in the interior. The same day Grey announced that "the war which commenced at Oakura is at an end", that "sufficient punishment" had been inflicted and that no more land would be confiscated. In fact no Taranaki land remained unconfiscated. Despite the announcement of peace, hostilities continued in the Taranaki War, as Major-General Trevor Chute stepped up his aggressive campaign of storming pā throughout South Taranaki.

Confiscations in Taranaki left many hapu with nothing of their own to live on, forcing them to become squatters on Crown land and driving them to unaccustomed levels of desperation.

=== Waikato ===
Although fighting in Waikato had finished by mid-1864, the following year Grey confiscated more than 480,000 hectares of land from the Waikato-Tainui iwi (tribe) in the Waikato as punishment for their earlier rebellion. Proclamations under the act were issued on 30 January 1865 for the seizure of the East Wairoa and West Pukekohe blocks for settlement and colonisation, followed by the Central Waikato district and the Mangere, Pukaki, Ihumata and Kerikeri blocks (16 May 1865). As the occupants were evicted from their land, their belongings were looted by colonial forces and neighbouring settlers, with houses ransacked, cattle seized and horses transported for sale in Auckland.

The war and confiscation of land caused heavy economic, social and cultural damage to Waikato-Tainui. King Tāwhiao and his people were forced to retreat into the heartland of Ngāti Maniapoto. The Maniapoto, by contrast, had been more zealous for war than the Waikato, yet suffered no loss of land because its territory was too remote to be of use to white settlers. The 1927 Royal Commission on Confiscated Land, chaired by senior Supreme Court judge Sir William Sim, concluded that although the government restored a quarter of the 1,202,172 acres (486,500 hectares) originally seized and paid almost £23,000 compensation, the Waikato confiscations had been "excessive". The Waitangi Tribunal in 1985 declared the Tainui people of the Waikato had never rebelled, but had been forced into a defensive war.

In the early 1990s Tainui opted to bypass the Waitangi Tribunal and concluded a Treaty claims settlement with the Crown through direct negotiation. In May 1995 the Crown signed a Deed of Settlement with Waikato-Tainui that included cash and land valued at $170 million. The settlement included an admission by the Crown that it had "unjustly confiscated" the land.

=== Bay of Plenty ===
On 17 January 1866, the Governor confiscated most Ngāti Awa land in the Bay of Plenty on the grounds of war and rebellion. The Waitangi Tribunal noted there was a "popular belief" the confiscations were punishment for the murder of James Te Mautaranui Fulloon, an officer of the Crown, at Whakatane in July 1865, but said the Settlements Act could not be used as a punishment for the crime of murder. In addition, only two or three of 30 Ngāti Awa hapu (sub-tribes) were involved in the murder, the individuals responsible for the murder were already on trial at the time of the confiscation and all resistance was at an end in the area, with local rangatira (chiefs) having taken an oath of allegiance. The most unconscionable of the many ironies in the confiscation was that the main part of the land used for military settlements was at Whakatane, on the land of the most innocent. The tribunal concluded: "We do not think it is at all established that there was a war in the usual sense. More particularly, we consider that there was no rebellion ... the confiscation was clearly contrary to the Treaty of Waitangi."

== Settlement of confiscated lands ==
Regulations of May 1851, and subsequent amendments by provinces, set levels of payments and land allocations, according to military rank and varying slightly from one province to another.

Soon after the passing of the Settlements Act in 1863, agents were employed to enlist men for military service in Taranaki from among the gold miners of Otago and Melbourne. Between 30 December 1863 and 17 February 1864 four ships arrived in New Plymouth carrying 489 volunteers. In Taranaki 39,600 hectares (98,000 acres) were laid out as military settlements with the hope that when men were released from military duty they would remain on their allotments and become permanent settlers. By 1866, when their three years of service was over, many had left Taranaki already, while most of those who did complete their service opted then to sell, leaving no more than 10 per cent of the military settlers on the land. Of the 11 towns laid out north of the Waingongoro River, most had no houses on them, while the most populous, including Normanby, Hawera and Carlyle (Pātea), rarely had more than a dozen. The main reason was the inability of the provincial government to provide work for the men, or to build roads and bridges linking the settlements.

Throughout New Zealand the government had confiscated areas clearly unsuitable for settlement: in Taranaki, they had taken the whole of Mt Taranaki, while in the Bay of Plenty they had confiscated Mt Putauaki, the whole of the Rangitaiki Swamp and other areas of thick bush. Military settlers ultimately took less than 1 per cent of land confiscated from Ngati Awa.

In Taranaki, Māori, often with the tacit consent of the government, later began returning to the lands that had been taken from them. When parts of those lands were subsequently wanted for settlement, compensation payments were made to Māori users – in government eyes, a bribe to keep the peace rather than a purchase price – and deeds of cession were signed, transferring title to Europeans. In 1880 spiritual leader Te Whiti o Rongomai judged that such payments meant the confiscations were a sham and began to actively claim back confiscated land that had not been used by the government, proceeding on the basis that Māori only had to enter the land and plough it to re-establish their rights. Te Whiti rejected cession payments and bribes and his followers persistently pulled up surveyors' pegs and obstructed road makers, initially in central Taranaki and later throughout New Zealand, with ploughmen's campaigns. Tension led to the armed police raid on Parihaka, Taranaki, in November 1881 and the expulsion of 2000 men, women and children, followed by the destruction of the village.
