= Dudley Stagpoole =

Recipient of the Victoria Cross

Dudley Stagpoole VC DCM
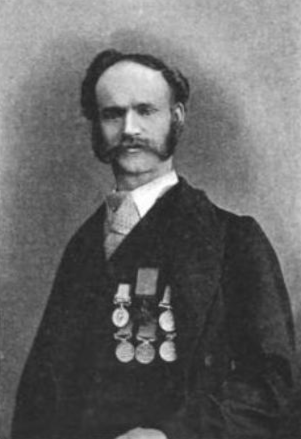
- Born: 1838; Killunan, County Galway, Ireland
- Died: 1 August 1911 (aged 72–73); Ware, Hertfordshire, England
- Burial place: Hendon Park Cemetery, Mill Hill
- Military career
- Allegiance: United Kingdom
- Branch: (United Kingdom of Great Britain and Ireland) British Army
- Rank: Drummer
- Units: 57th Regiment of Foot
- Conflicts: Crimean War; Second Taranaki War
- Awards: Victoria Cross Distinguished Conduct Medal; Crimea Medal, Sebastopol clasp New Zealand War Medal, 1860–66; Turkish Crimea Medal, 1855–56 Long Service & Good Conduct Medal

Dudley Stagpoole VC DCM (1838 – 1 August 1911) was a British Army soldier and an Irish recipient of the Victoria Cross, the highest award for gallantry in the face of the enemy that can be awarded to British and Commonwealth forces.

== Early life ==
Stagpoole was born in Killunan, County Galway in 1838.

== Victoria Cross ==
Drummer Dudley Stagpoole, 57th Regiment of Foot, was about 25 years old during the Second Taranaki War in New Zealand, when the following deed took place on 2 October 1863 at Allan's Hill near Poutoko, Taranaki, for which he and Ensign John Thornton Down were awarded the Victoria Cross (VC). Stagpoole had been awarded the Distinguished Conduct Medal (DCM) for a separate incident at Kaipakopako:

For their conduct at Pontoko, on the 2nd October, in rescuing a wounded comrade from the rebel Maories. They succeeded in bringing in the wounded man, who was lying at about fifty yards from the bush, although the enemy kept up a very heavy fire from the bush at short range, and also from behind fallen logs close at hand.

The man had been wounded during an engagement with the rebel natives, and Ensign Down, and Drummer Stagpoole, responded to the call of the Officer commanding the detachment of the Regiment for volunteers to bring him in.

The Medal for Distinguished Conduct in the Field has already been conferred on Drummer Stagpoole, for the energy and devotion which he displayed on 25 September 1863, at the affair near Kaipakopako, in having, though wounded in the head, twice volunteered and brought in wounded men.

== Further information ==
He died in Ware, Hertfordshire on 1 August 1911.

His Victoria Cross is displayed at the Princess of Wales's Royal Regiment and Queen's Regiment RHQ, Howe Barracks, Canterbury, Kent
