= Armine von Tempski =

American writer

Armine von Tempski (born Ethel Armine von Tempsky) (April 1, 1892 – December 2, 1943) was an American writer and one of Hawaii's best known authors.

== Biography ==
=== Early life and family ===
Ethel Armine von Tempsky was born April 1, 1892, in Honolulu, Hawaii, to Louis Ludwig von Tempsky and Amy Dulcibella Wodehouse Von Tempsky. Her father was the son of the Poland-born 19th-century adventurer and newspaper correspondent Gustavus von Tempsky.

In later years, Armine began listing her birth year as 1899, such as on her 1932 marriage record, and the date was subsequently used in many of her obituaries. However, her birth certificate and 1920 passport application suggest a correct birth date of 1892.

=== Writing career ===
Armine Von Tempski's autobiographies and novels were based on her early life among the paniolos (cowboys) on the Haleakala cattle ranch atop the Haleakalā shield volcano. The Haleakala Ranch, which Jack London first visited in 1907, was his favourite of the Hawaiian ranches he enjoyed on several extended visits with his wife Charmian. The young Armine, then sixteen years old, asked London to read some of her stories and give his opinion. He said that they were "clumsy, incoherent tripe" but added that "every so often there's a streak of fire on your pages," which encouraged her.

Her first published writing, in the early 1920s, was about efforts to restore the island of Kahoolawe after years of drought and overgrazing.

== Personal life ==
She married California real estate agent Alfred Lathrop Ball on December 25, 1932, in Ventura County, California. They were friends of poet Don Blanding, who illustrated von Tempski's book, Ripe Breadfruit (New York: Dodd, Mead and Company, 1935).

== Death ==
Von Tempski died in Fresno, California on December 2, 1943 at age 51. On November 28, she traveled by train from Manhattan Beach to Fresno for a speaking engagement that evening at the First Congregational Church regarding her recent book Thunder in Heaven. Von Tempski reported that she came down with "a feverish cold" during the "last leg" of the approximately 200-mile train trip. She eventually canceled the appearance due to sickness, with a Fresno-area physician diagnosing her illness as influenza.

Von Tempski apparently felt too sick to travel home from Fresno, and was last seen alive on the afternoon of December 2. She was found dead in her room by staff at The Californian Hotel on the morning of December 3, with the coroner listing her cause of death as heart attack. She was buried at Forest Lawn Cemetery in Glendale, California on December 4, 1943.

== Bibliography ==
The Ox Bow Press in Woodbridge, Connecticut, publishes reprint editions of von Tempski's books.

=== Autobiographies ===
- 1940. Born in Paradise. (Bestseller.) Paperback: ISBN 0-918024-34-X.
- 1946. Aloha. (Sequel) Paperback: ISBN 0-918024-59-5. Hardcover: ISBN 0-918024-63-3.

=== Fiction ===
- 1927. Hula : a romance of Hawaii. Woodbridge, Conn.: Ox Bow Press. 1988. ISBN 0918024609. OCLC 17353830. Hula. Hardcover: ISBN 0-918024-64-1 (the 1927 silent film Hula was based on it)
- 1928. Dust : a novel of Hawaii. Woodbridge, Conn.: Ox Bow Press. 1991. ISBN 0918024862. OCLC 24142295. Hardcover: ISBN 0-918024-86-2.
- 1929. Fire : a novel of Hawaii. Woodbridge, Conn.: Ox Bow Press. 1992. ISBN 0918024994. OCLC 26673117.
- 1933. Hawaiian harvest. Woodbridge, Conn.: Ox Bow Press. 1990. ISBN 0918024730. OCLC 20932753. (Fictional account of the pineapple industry's beginnings on Maui) Hardcover: ISBN 0-918024-73-0.
- 1935. Ripe breadfruit. Woodbridge, Conn.: Ox Bow Press. 1992. ISBN 0918024986. OCLC 26673104.
- 1940. Pam's paradise ranch : a story of Hawaii. Brown, Paul, 1893-1958. Woodbridge, Conn.: Ox Bow Press. 1993. ISBN 091802496X. OCLC 26258819. (For younger readers.)
- 1941. Judy of the islands : a story of the South Seas. Burger, Carl, 1888-1967. Woodbridge, Conn.: Ox Bow Press. 1993. ISBN 0918024978. OCLC 26258827.
- 1942. Thunder in heaven. Woodbridge, Conn.: Ox Bow Press. 1990. ISBN 0918024757. OCLC 20932759. Hardcover: ISBN 0-918024-75-7.
- 1946. Bright spurs. Brown, Paul, 1893-1958. Woodbridge, Conn.: Ox Bow Press. 1993. ISBN 0918024951. OCLC 26258840.
