= William Inglis (British Army officer) =

British Army officer (1764–1835)

Lieutenant-General Sir William Inglis KCB
- c. 1820 portrait
- Born: 1764; Edinburgh, Scotland
- Died: 29 November 1835 (aged 70–71); Ramsgate, Kent
- Military career
- Allegiance: Great Britain; United Kingdom of Great Britain and Ireland
- Branch: British Army
- Service years: 1779–1835
- Rank: Lieutenant-general
- Commands: 57th Regiment of Foot
- Conflicts: American War of Independence; French Revolutionary Wars; Flanders campaign; Siege of Nijmegen (1794); West Indies campaign; Napoleonic Wars; Peninsular War; Battle of Bussaco; Second siege of Badajoz (1811); Battle of Albuera (WIA); Battle of the Pyrenees; Battle of Sorauren; Battle of San Marcial; Battle of Nivelle (WIA); Battle of Orthez
- Awards: Army Gold Cross
- Other work: Governor of Cork

Lieutenant-General Sir William Inglis, KCB (1764 – 29 November 1835) was a British Army officer who served in the French Revolutionary and Napoleonic Wars. Inglis fought in several of the bloodiest engagements of the Peninsular War, was wounded numerous times and earned national fame through his exhortation "Die hard 57th, die hard!" to his regiment as he lay seriously wounded behind their ranks at the height of the Battle of Albuera. The regiment held and the battle was won and although his wounds nearly proved fatal, Inglis returned to action again two years later to see the war out as a brigadier general. Following the end of the Napoleonic Wars Inglis was knighted and served in several military governorships including a spell as governor of Cork, in which position he died in 1835.

== Early career ==
Almost nothing is known of Inglis's childhood, save that he was born in 1764, the third son of Dr. William Inglis, head of the College of Surgeons, Edinburgh. His mother was Margaret Spens, daughter of Thomas Spens. He was born in Edinburgh Scotland. No details of his education are known. Indeed, the first undisputed records about him which are known are those indicating that he was commissioned into the 57th Regiment of Foot as an ensign in 1779, although he did not actually join the regiment for another two years, meeting them in New York at the height of the American War of Independence in 1781. Inglis and his regiment was sent to Nova Scotia in 1793 and he spent the next ten years in Canada.

Whilst stationed in North America, Inglis became a lieutenant in 1782 and a captain in 1785. When his unit returned to Britain in 1791, the French Revolution had begun and Inglis was engaged during the next two years maintaining order in the English Midlands. When war with France broke out in 1793, the 57th was dispatched to the army of the Duke of York as part of the Flanders campaign. The same year, Inglis and his men were also briefly detached to a failed expedition to Brittany, but by the time the campaign had faltered in the winter of 1794, Ingis was back in Belgium.

Participating in the siege of Nijmegen and withdrawal to Bremen during the winter of 1794, Inglis performed well, and despite the failure of a second expedition to Brittany in 1795, he was promoted to major. In 1796, Inglis and his regiment were posted to the West Indies, arriving in early 1796 as the only vessel of the convoy to make it safely across the Atlantic Ocean on the ship Charon. Due to the consequent paucity of soldiers, Inglis was prominently involved in the British invasion of St. Lucia and the capture of the Morne Fortuné fort. Inglis had acted as second-in-command to Sir John Moore, who admired his subordinate's abilities, and Inglis was also later engaged in the capture of the islands of Grenada and Trinidad.

Whilst in the Caribbean, Inglis had been promoted to lieutenant colonel and in 1802 returned to Britain during the Peace of Amiens. He was employed until 1804 in raising a new second battalion of the 57th and in 1804 took over command of his new unit in the Channel Islands garrison. In the islands, Inglis found his men to be lacking discipline when off duty, referring to them as "fighting villains", but was repeatedly praised for the morale and ability of his men. The regiment left the Channel Islands in 1809 after five years and was attached to Sir Arthur Wellesley's army in Portugal for service in the Peninsular War.

== Peninsular War ==
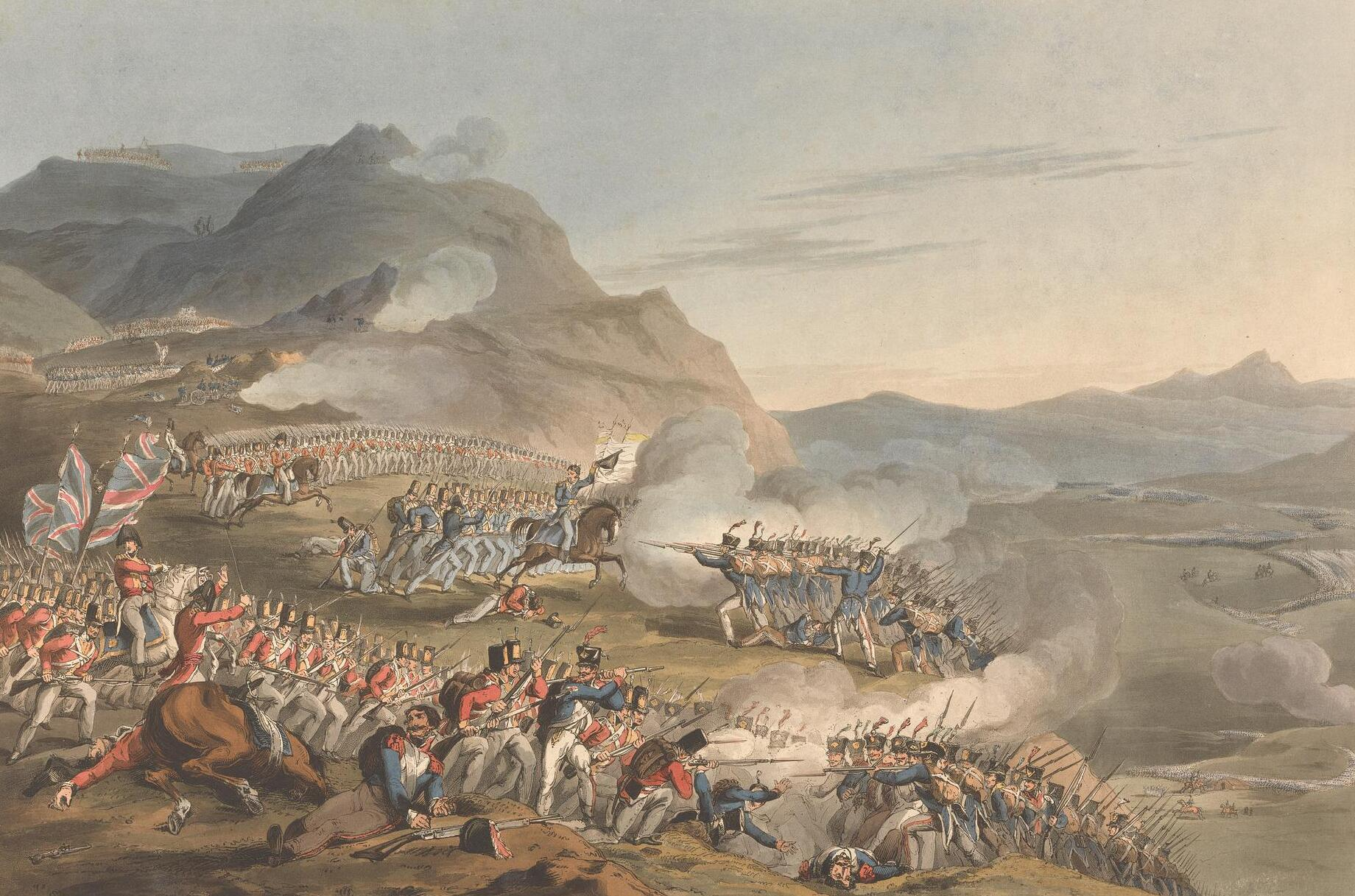
The Battle of Bussaco, which Inglis fought in

In Portugal, Inglis's battalion was attached to the 2nd Division's 3rd Brigade under the command General Richard Stewart, an officer whose ill-health caused responsibility for the Brigade to fall to Inglis (who had recently been promoted to colonel) days before the Battle of Bussaco on 27 September 1810 as Wellesley sought to inflict a defeat on André Masséna before withdrawing behind the Lines of Torres Vedras. The action was a success and Inglis performed well, retaining command of the brigade into the following year when the British Army pursued the retreating Masséna. Inglis saw action during these operations in a skirmish at Pombal and action at Campo Mayor and Los Santos, when British forces withdrew from action in an attempt to surprise the French at the Battle of Albuera.

=== Battle of Albuera ===
Albuera would prove to be the event that ensured the memory of Inglis' name in history. The British force present on the field was commanded by General William Beresford, and tactical mistakes by him resulted in the destruction of its left by French cavalry early in the engagement. Compelled thereupon to face the main French attack with less support than planned, the 3rd Brigade, now under the leadership of Daniel Hoghton, suffered gravely.

=== "Die hard 57th, die hard" ===
The threat from the French cavalry meant that the 3rd Brigade's units were compelled to remain in tight formation despite facing a greatly superior weight of French infantry advancing upon them, supported by French light artillery brought up to within 300 yards and firing highly destructive grape and canister shot into the British line. Hoghton was killed in the fighting and Inglis himself was struck by a 4 lb grapeshot, the missile penetrating his neck and entering his shoulder, lodging in his upper back, causing severe blood loss and pain.

Refusing offers of assistance to be withdrawn from the fight, Inglis lay wounded with the regimental colours just behind the 57th's beleaguered lines as its ranks dwindled having lost two-thirds of its strength under the surrounding weight of overwhelming French numbers and the devastating fire to which it was being repeatedly subjected, from where, amidst the maelstrom, he could be heard shouting the exhortation repeatedly "Die hard 57th, die hard!" as the moment of crisis for the regiment arrived and it faced annihilation.

However, in spite of the pressure and extensive casualties sustained from the French advancing masses the 57th's line just held, and the French troops, apparently losing heart from the casualties they were sustaining from the ferocity of its concentrated volley fire, faltered in their forward momentum, and subsequently broke and retreated due to the arrival of other British forces threatening them from elsewhere upon the field. Inglis's words at the height of the crisis became the regimental motto of the 57th.

=== Return to the Peninsula ===
Inglis was carried from the field close to death at the action's conclusion, and it was two days before surgeons could operate on him to remove the grapeshot. Beresford especially commended Inglis after the action, saying that "Nothing could exceed the conduct and gallantry of Colonel Inglis at the head of his regiment." Inglis' wounds were so severe that he was forced to return to Britain to recuperate and consequently missed the succeeding two years of the Peninsular War, spending much of 1812 running a court-martial board in Lisbon. In May 1813 he was again well enough for active command and was made a brigadier general and then a major general in command of a brigade of the 7th Division. With this unit, Inglis participated in the manoeuvres in the Pyrenees Mountains on the Franco-Spanish border and the ensuing Battle of the Pyrenees, where he stormed a defended rise on the French right at the head of his men and broke its defenders, allowing the British Army to cover the valley and thus forcing a French withdrawal. During the action, Inglis had a horse shot from underneath him.

In the campaigns of 1813, Inglis was heavily engaged with the French in supporting Portuguese operations near Vera. At the battle, Inglis lost another horse and suffered heavy casualties in action with a very superior French force. In November 1813, Inglis led his men across the Nivelle River and stormed and took the heights above it in the Battle of Nivelle, a successful action at which Inglis was slightly wounded in the foot. In February 1814 Inglis's brigade was again in action, at Airgavé and was engaged at the Battle of Orthez shortly afterwards where another horse was shot underneath him.

== Retirement ==
1815 portrait of Inglis

At the conclusion of the Peninsular War, Inglis returned to Britain and was voted thanks by both Houses of Parliament and made a Knight Commander of the Order of the Bath. He was also presented with medals for his service at Albuera, the Pyrenees and Nivelle with three clasps. During a lengthy retirement, Inglis married Mary Anne Raymond in 1822 and the couple had two sons, William and Raymond, who both later became army officers. In 1825, Inglis was promoted to lieutenant-general and returned to service as Lieutenant-Governor of Kinsale in Ireland in 1827. Two years later Inglis was promoted to Governor of Cork and retained the post until his death. In 1830 he was also appointed colonel of the 57th Regiment, the unit he served with for 31 years.

== Death ==
Inglis died in his 71st year at Ramsgate in the County of Kent on 29 November 1835. His body was buried in the Chapter House of Canterbury Cathedral. He was survived by his wife and two sons.

== Notes ==
Military offices
Preceded by Sir Brent Spencer	Governor of Cork; 1829–1835	Office abolished
Preceded by Sir Hew Dalrymple	Colonel of the 57th (West Middlesex) Regiment of Foot; 1830–1835	Succeeded by Sir Frederick Adam
