= 57th (West Middlesex) Regiment of Foot =

- c. 1879 regimental glengarry badge
- Active: 1755–1881
- Country: Great Britain (1755–1800); United Kingdom (1801–1881)
- Branch: British Army
- Type: Infantry
- Role: Line infantry
- Size: One battalion (1755–1803, 1815–1881); Two battalions (1803–1815)
- Garrison/HQ: Hounslow Barracks, London
- Nicknames: "The Steelbacks" "The Die Hards"
- Motto: Honi soit qui mal y pense ("Shamed be who thinks evil of it")
- Colors: Yellow facings, gold braided lace
- March: Quick: Sir Manley Power; Slow: Caledonian
- Engagements: American War of Independence; French Revolutionary and Napoleonic Wars; Crimean War; Indian Rebellion of 1857; New Zealand Wars; Anglo-Zulu War

The 57th (West Middlesex) Regiment of Foot was a line infantry regiment of the British Army. Raised in 1755 in Somerset and Gloucestershire as the 59th Regiment of Foot for service in the Seven Years' War, the regiment was re-ranked as the 57th Regiment of Foot in 1756. It spent the rest of the war in Gibraltar, being sent to Minorca in 1763 and Ireland in 1767. The regiment was sent to North America in 1776 to serve in the American War of Independence, seeing action in major engagements across the Eastern Seaboard and being renamed the "57th (West Middlesex) Regiment of Foot" in 1782. It was sent to Nova Scotia in 1783 and returned to England in 1790.

Between 1793 and 1794 the regiment was twice sent to Low Countries as part of the Flanders campaign of the French Revolutionary Wars. In 1796 it was sent to the West Indies and took part in the capture of Saint Lucia and Trinidad before returning to England in 1803, where a second regimental battalion was raised. While the second battalion spent most of the Napoleonic Wars garrisoning Jersey, the first battalion was sent to Gibraltar in 1805 and garrisoned it for four years before being redeployed to Portugal in 1809 to serve in the Peninsular War.

Following the end of the Peninsular War, in which the first battalion fought in several major battles, the battalion was sent to North America in 1814 to serve in the War of 1812 but returned to England in 1815 having seen no action. The regiment, which saw its second battalion disbanded in 1815, was sent to New South Wales in 1824 and redeployed to India in 1830, returning to England in 1846. It was sent to the Crimea in 1856 to serve in the Crimean War, but was redeployed to Malta in the same year and in 1858 was sent to India to suppress the Indian Rebellion of 1857.

The regiment was sent to New Zealand in 1860 to serve in the New Zealand Wars, seeing action in the Second Taranaki War, and returned to England in 1867. It was sent to British Ceylon in 1873 and again to the Cape Colony in 1879, where the regiment served in the Anglo-Zulu War. Under the Childers Reforms the regiment was amalgamated with the 77th (East Middlesex) Regiment of Foot to form the Middlesex Regiment in 1881.

== History ==
=== Early wars ===
The regiment was raised in Somerset and Gloucestershire in 1755 by Colonel John Arabin as the 59th Regiment of Foot for service in the Seven Years' War. It was re-ranked as the 57th Regiment of Foot in 1756 following the disbandment of the 50th and 51st Regiments of Foot. The regiment was sent to Gibraltar in 1757 being redeployed to Minorca in 1763 following the war's end. It was subsequently sent to Ireland in 1767.

The regiment was sent from Ireland to Charleston, South Carolina in February 1776 for service in the American War of Independence, participating in the Battle of Sullivan's Island on 28 June. It saw action at the Battle of Long Island on 27 August and the Battle of Forts Clinton and Montgomery on 6 October 1777. The regiment's light company served under Lieutenant-general Lord Cornwallis during the war's Southern theatre and was taken prisoner on 19 October 1781 at the siege of Yorktown. On 21 August 1782 the regiment adopted a county designation as the 57th (West Middlesex) Regiment of Foot. It was sent to Nova Scotia in October 1783 and returned to England in November 1790.

=== French Revolutionary and Napoleonic Wars ===
Regimental drummer boy, junior officer and private in 1804

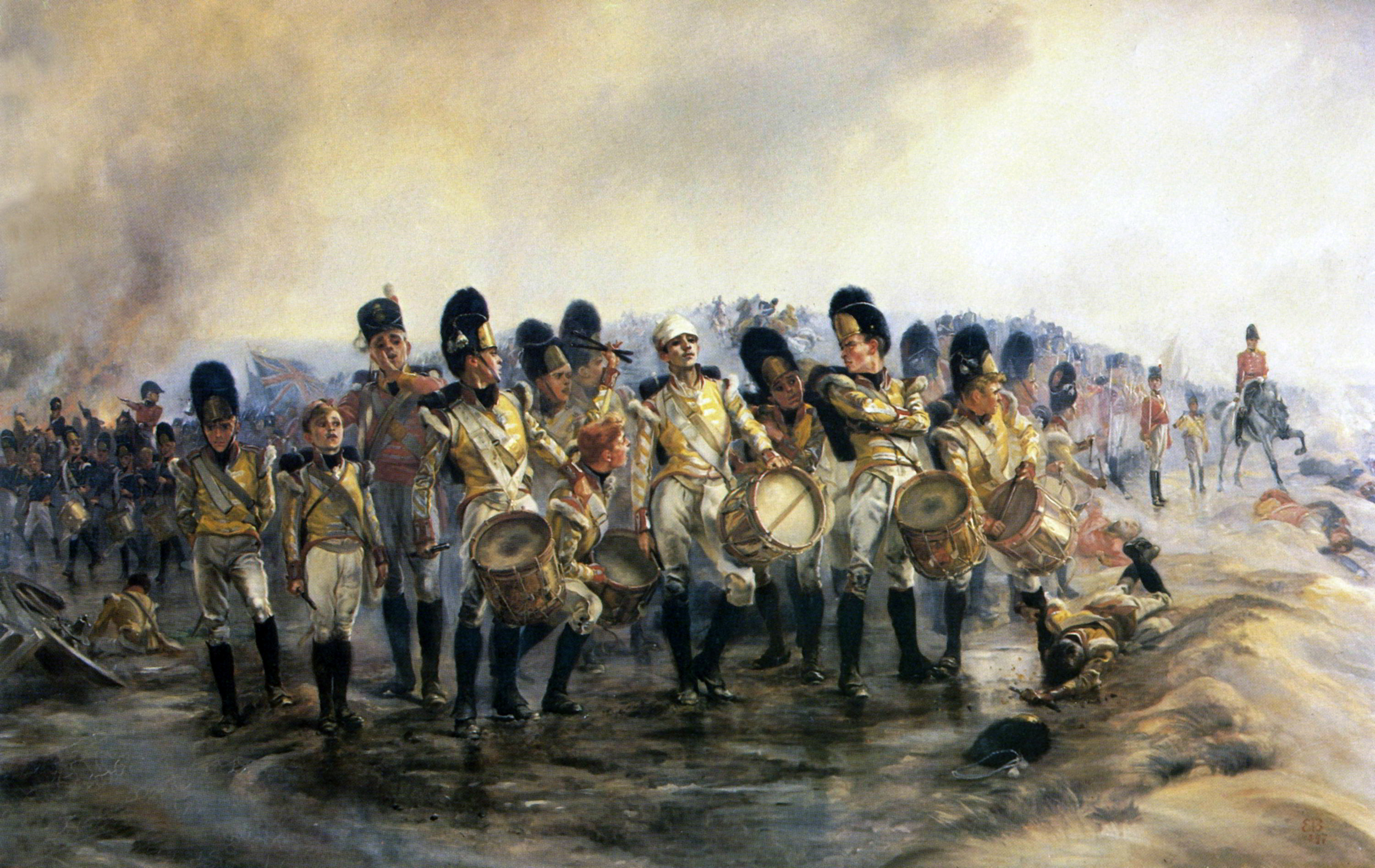
Regimental drummer boys at the Battle of Albuera

In 1793 the regiment embarked for the Low Countries for service in the Flanders campaign of the French Revolutionary Wars and re-enforced the allied garrison at Nieuwpoort for several months before returning home later in the year. It returned to Flanders in 1794 before returning home again in 1795. The regiment embarked for the West Indies in spring 1796 and took part in the capture of Saint Lucia in May 1796 and the capture of Trinidad in February 1797, returning to England in 1803. A second battalion was raised in 1803 to increase the regiment's strength and spent most of the Napoleonic Wars garrisoning Jersey. The first battalion embarked for Gibraltar in November 1805 and after four years of garrison duty landed in Portugal for service in the Peninsular War in July 1809. In October 1810 the battalion participated in the withdrawal back to the Lines of Torres Vedras.

The battalion earned the regiment its nickname of "the Die Hards" after its participation in the Battle of Albuera on 16 May 1811. During the battle the battalion's commanding officer Lieutenant-colonel William Inglis was hit by French canister shot but refused to be carried to the rear for treatment, lying in front of his men calling on them to hold their position and when the fight reached its fiercest repeatedly cried "Die hard the 57th, die hard!". The battalion's casualties included 422 out of 570 other ranks and 20 out of 30 officers. The commander of the allied army Lieutenant-general William Beresford wrote in his dispatch that "our dead, particularly the 57th Regiment, were lying as they fought in the ranks, every wound in front".

The first battalion subsequently fought at the Battle of Vitoria on 21 June 1813. It proceeded to participate in the Battle of the Pyrenees in July 1813, before joining the campaign in south-west France, seeing action at the Battle of Nivelle on 10 November 1813 and the Battle of the Nive in December 1813. The battalion embarked for North America in May 1814 for service in the War of 1812 but saw no action and embarked for home in spring 1815, the same year in which the regiment's second battalion was disbanded.

=== Victorian era ===
Regimental troops near Inkerman, 1855

The regiment traveled to the British colony of New South Wales in detachments as escorts to prisoners in 1824. It moved on to British India in 1830 and, while there, helped to suppress a rebellion in Mangalore in 1837. The regiment did not embark for home until April 1846. In September 1854 the regiment embarked for service in the Crimean War: it fought at the Battle of Inkerman in November 1854 and the siege of Sevastapol in winter 1854. It moved to Malta in June 1856 and then sailed for India in May 1858 to participate in the suppression of the Indian Rebellion of 1857. It then sailed for Auckland in British colony of New Zealand in November 1860 for service in the New Zealand Wars. Ensign John Thornton Down and Drummer Dudley Stagpoole were both awarded the Victoria Cross for their actions during a skirmish at Allen's Hill near Omata in October 1863 during the Second Taranaki War. The regiment returned to England in 1867 and then moved to British Ceylon in 1873. From Ceylon it sailed to Cape Colony in 1879 for service in the Anglo-Zulu War.

As part of the Cardwell Reforms of the 1870s, where single-battalion regiments were linked together to share a single depot and recruiting district in the United Kingdom, the 57th was linked with the 77th (East Middlesex) Regiment of Foot, and assigned to district no. 50 at Hounslow Barracks. On 1 July 1881 the Childers Reforms came into effect and the regiment amalgamated with the 77th (East Middlesex) Regiment of Foot to form the Middlesex Regiment.

== Regimental marches ==
The regiment's regimental marches were 'Sir Manley Power' (quick) and 'Caledonian' (slow).

== Victoria Cross ==
- Ensign John Thornton Down, New Zealand Wars (2 October 1863)
- Sergeant George Gardiner, Crimean War (22 March 1855)
- Private Charles McCorrie, Crimean War (23 June 1855)
- Drummer Dudley Stagpoole, New Zealand Land Wars (2 October 1863)

== Battle honours ==
The regiment's battle honours were as follows:

- Peninsular War: Albuhera, Vittoria, Pyrenees, Nivelle, Nive, Peninsula
- Crimean War: Inkerman, Sevastapol
- Later wars: New Zealand, South Africa (1879)

== Colonels of the Regiment ==
Colonels of the Regiment were:

=== 59th Regiment of Foot ===
- 1755–1757 Col. John Arabin

=== 57th Regiment of Foot ===
- 1757–1767 Lt-Gen. Sir David Cunynghame
- 1767–1780 Gen. Sir John Irwin
- 1780–1806 Gen. John Campbell (of Strachur)

==== 57th (the West Middlesex) Regiment of Foot ====
- 1806–1811 Gen. John Hely-Hutchinson, 2nd Earl of Donoughmore
- 1811–1830 Gen. Sir Hew Whitefoord Dalrymple, Bt.
- 1830–1835 Lt-Gen. Sir William Inglis
- 1835–1843 Gen. Sir Frederick Adam
- 1843–1856 F.M. Sir Henry Hardinge, 1st Viscount Hardinge
- 1856–1865 Gen. Sir James Frederick Love
- 1865–1873 Gen. Charles Richard Fox
- 1873–1875 Gen. Freeman Murray
- 1875–1881 Gen. Sir Edward Alan Holdich

== See also ==
- Edwin Bezar – last surviving member

== Sources ==
- Chant, Christopher (1988). The Handbook of British Regiments. Routledge. ISBN 0-415-00241-9.
- Gurwood, John (1837). The dispatches of Field Marshal the Duke of Wellington, K. G. during his various campaigns in India, Denmark, Portugal, Spain, the Low Countries, and France: From 1799 to 1818, Volume 7. J.Murray.
- Warre, Lieutenant-General H. J. (1878). Historical records of the fifty-seventh, or, West Middlesex Regiment of Foot: compiled from official and private sources, from the date of its formation in 1755, to the present time, 1878. W. Mitchell & Co.
