= Die hard (phrase) =

Phrase describing fanatic believers

William Inglis, who coined the phrase

Die hard is a phrase coined by the British Army officer William Inglis on 16 May 1811 during the Battle of Albuera. Its original literal meaning has evolved to describe any person who will not be swayed from a belief. The metaphorical sense was first applied almost exclusively to right-wing politics but, since the latter half of the 20th century, it has come into general use with wide application.

== Original military use ==
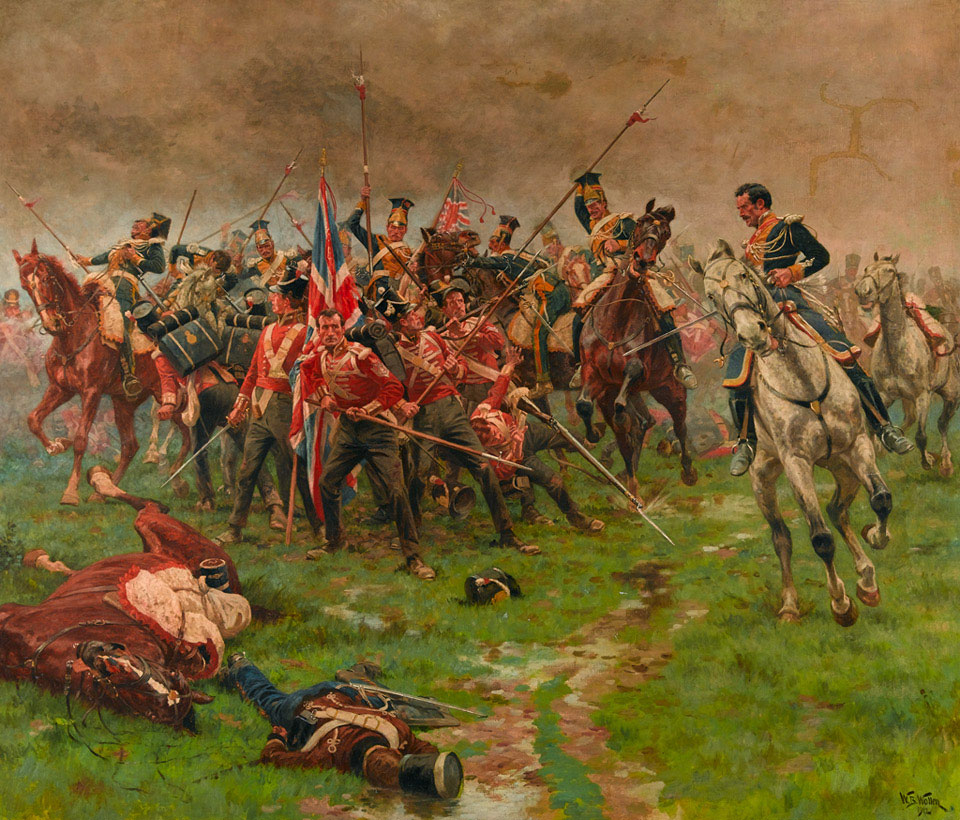
The Battle of Albuera by William Barnes Wollen

The phrase die hard was first used during the Battle of Albuera, which was fought on 16 May 1811 as part of the Peninsular War. During the battle, Lieutenant-colonel William Inglis of the British Army's 57th (West Middlesex) Regiment of Foot was wounded by canister shot. Despite his injuries, Inglis refused to retire from the battle but remained with the regimental colours, encouraging his men with the words "Die hard 57th, die hard!" as they came under intense pressure from a French attack. The 'Die Hards' subsequently became the West Middlesex's regimental nickname.

The term was later used to deride several senior British army officers who sought to maintain the system bequeathed to them by the Duke of Wellington and who strenuously resisted military reforms enacted by the Parliament of the United Kingdom starting in the late 1860s.

== British political uses ==
In British politics the adjective "die-hard" (best written with a hyphen) was first used to describe those who, during the crisis caused by the Lords' rejection of David Lloyd George's "People's Budget" of 1909, refused to accept the diminution of the House of Lords' powers by the Parliament Act 1911, and who generally held right-wing views, most notably Richard Verney, 19th Baron Willoughby de Broke.

It was subsequently used to describe right-wing critics of Lloyd George's coalition government 1918–1922, several of whom had been die-hards before the War such as Leopold Maxse. There was at this time a "higher proportion of Irishmen in the Diehard group than in the rest of the parliamentary Conservative Party".

It was later revived to describe a grouping of members of the Conservative Party in the 1930s, including Henry Page Croft who had been prominent among both the earlier die-hards, who amongst other things refused to accept any moves towards Indian independence. But this time it also included some who "did not necessarily share the general views of the right on other matters", such as Winston Churchill who had been a bête noire of the original die-hards. Some of the die-hards, though not Churchill, flirted with Oswald Mosley's British Union of Fascists or supported Neville Chamberlain's policy of appeasement.

== Other usage ==
The term is now commonly used to describe any person who will not be swayed from a belief, and was used as the title of the popular action movie series Die Hard, starring Bruce Willis as police officer John McClane.

It is the inspiration for the character "Die-Hardman" in the video game Death Stranding.

== See also ==
- Hardline
