= Hula (film) =

1927 film

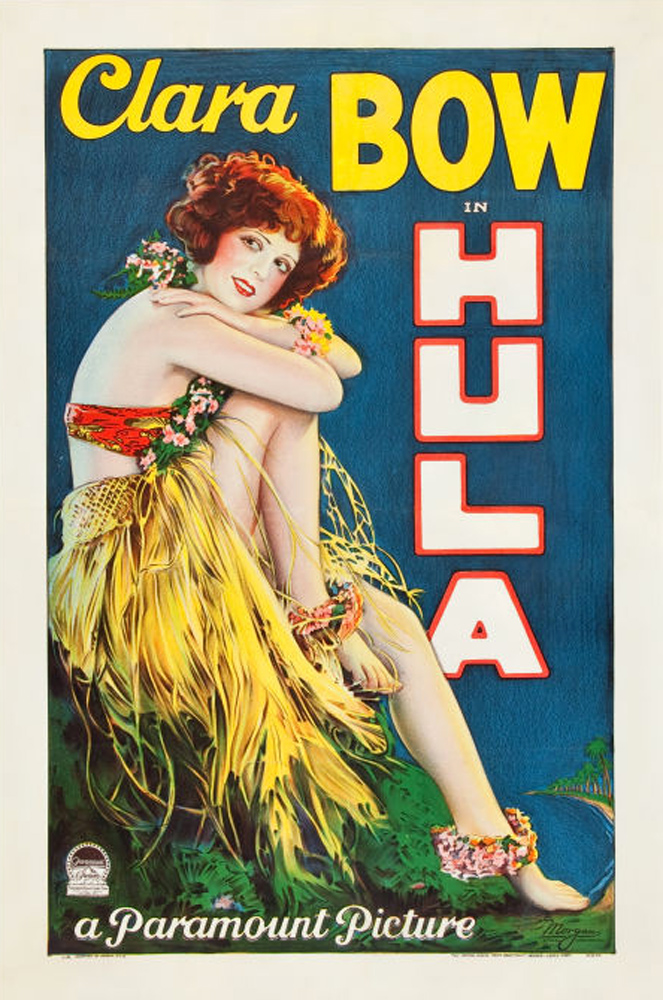
- Directed by: Victor Fleming
- Written by: Doris Anderson (adaptation); Ethel Doherty (scenario); George Marion, Jr. (titles); Frederica Sagor (uncredited)
- Based on: Hula, a Romance of Hawaii by Armine von Tempski
- Produced by: Adolph Zukor; Jesse L. Lasky; B. P. Schulberg (associate producer)
- Starring: Clara Bow; Clive Brook; Arlette Marchal; Albert Gran
- Cinematography: William Marshall
- Edited by: E. Lloyd Sheldon; Eda Warren
- Distributed by: Paramount Pictures
- Release date: August 27, 1927
- Running time: 64 minutes
- Country: United States
- Language: Silent (English intertitles)

Hula (full film)

Hula is a 1927 American silent romantic comedy film directed by Victor Fleming, and based on the novel Hula, a Romance of Hawaii (1927) by Armine von Tempski. The film stars Clara Bow and was released by Paramount Pictures. The film entered into the public domain on January 1, 2023, because regardless of the film itself's renewal status, the copyright of the book it was based on was renewed in 1954.

== Plot ==
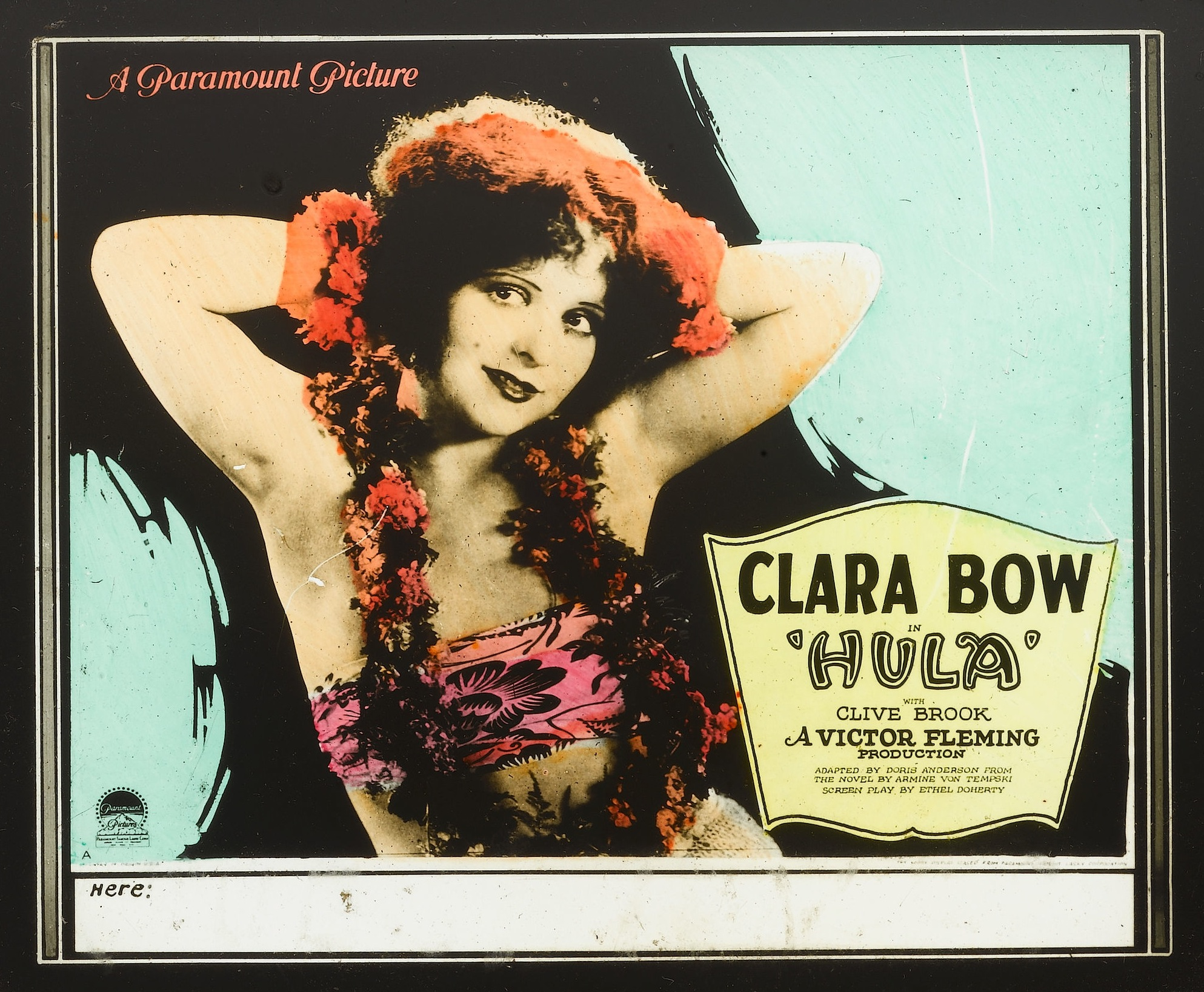
Hula, 1927 lantern slide

Hula Calhoun is the daughter of a Hawaiian planter, Bill Calhoun. She follows the advice of her uncle Edwin, and follows a simple and natural life, far from social conventions of her family and is considered a "wild child" who wears pants and rides horses.

Courted with adoration by Harry Dehan, Hula prefers a young British engineer, Anthony Haldane, who came to the island to oversee the construction of a dam on her father's property. However, Haldane is already married. At a party, Haldane tries to keep his distance but Hula gets drunk and performs a seductive hula dance for him. She manages to provoke him so much that he promises that he will get a divorce. When his wife, Margaret, appears, Hula makes a deal with one of the foreman to use dynamite to seemingly blow up a point on the dam. Thinking that her husband is now ruined, Mrs. Haldane agrees to the divorce, and the two lovers can finally get married.

== Cast ==
- Clara Bow as Hula Calhoun
- Clive Brook as Anthony Haldane
- Arlette Marchal as Mrs. Bane
- Albert Gran as Bill Calhoun
- Arnold Kent as Harry Dehan
- Patricia Dupont as Margaret Haldane
- Agostino Borgato as Uncle Edwin
- Duke Kahanamoku as Hawaiian boy

== Production ==
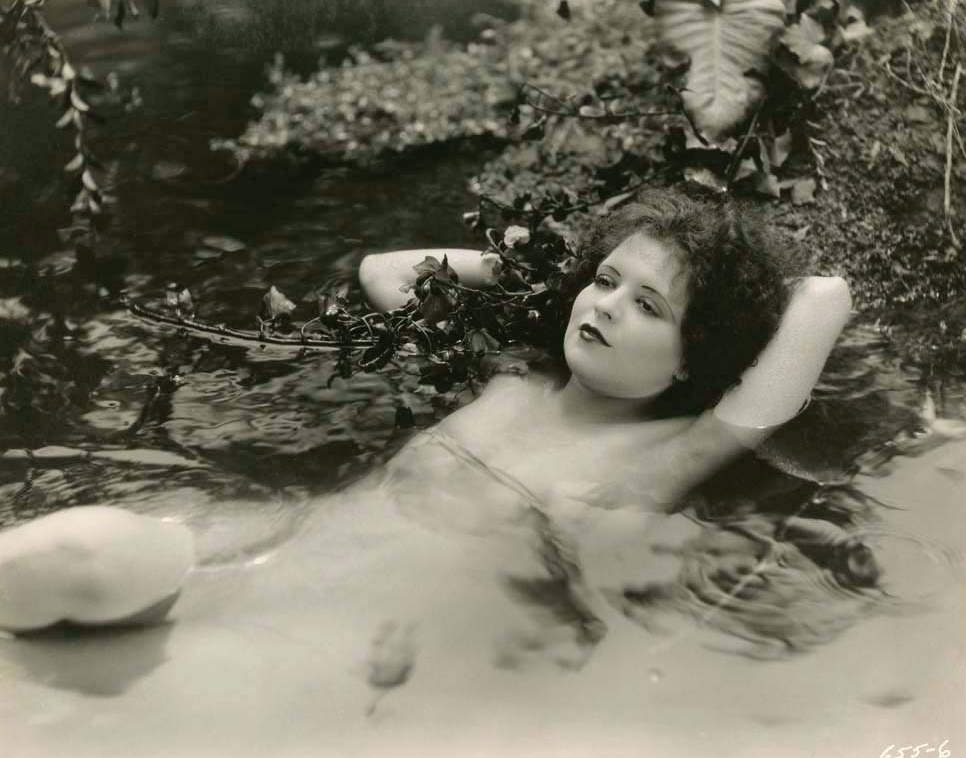
Bow in a famous scene from the film

In the opening scene of the film Hula is shown swimming nude in a stream, and later is wearing pants and articulates her sexual desires. Similar to Sadie Thompson (1928), the film depicts a modern woman who is located outside the bounds of American civilization and thus able to act in an "uncivilized" manner like natives who live on the islands.

== See also ==
- Nudity in film
- The White Flower (1923)
