= Gustavus von Tempsky =

New Zealand adventurer and artist (1828–1868)

Gustavus Ferdinand von Tempsky
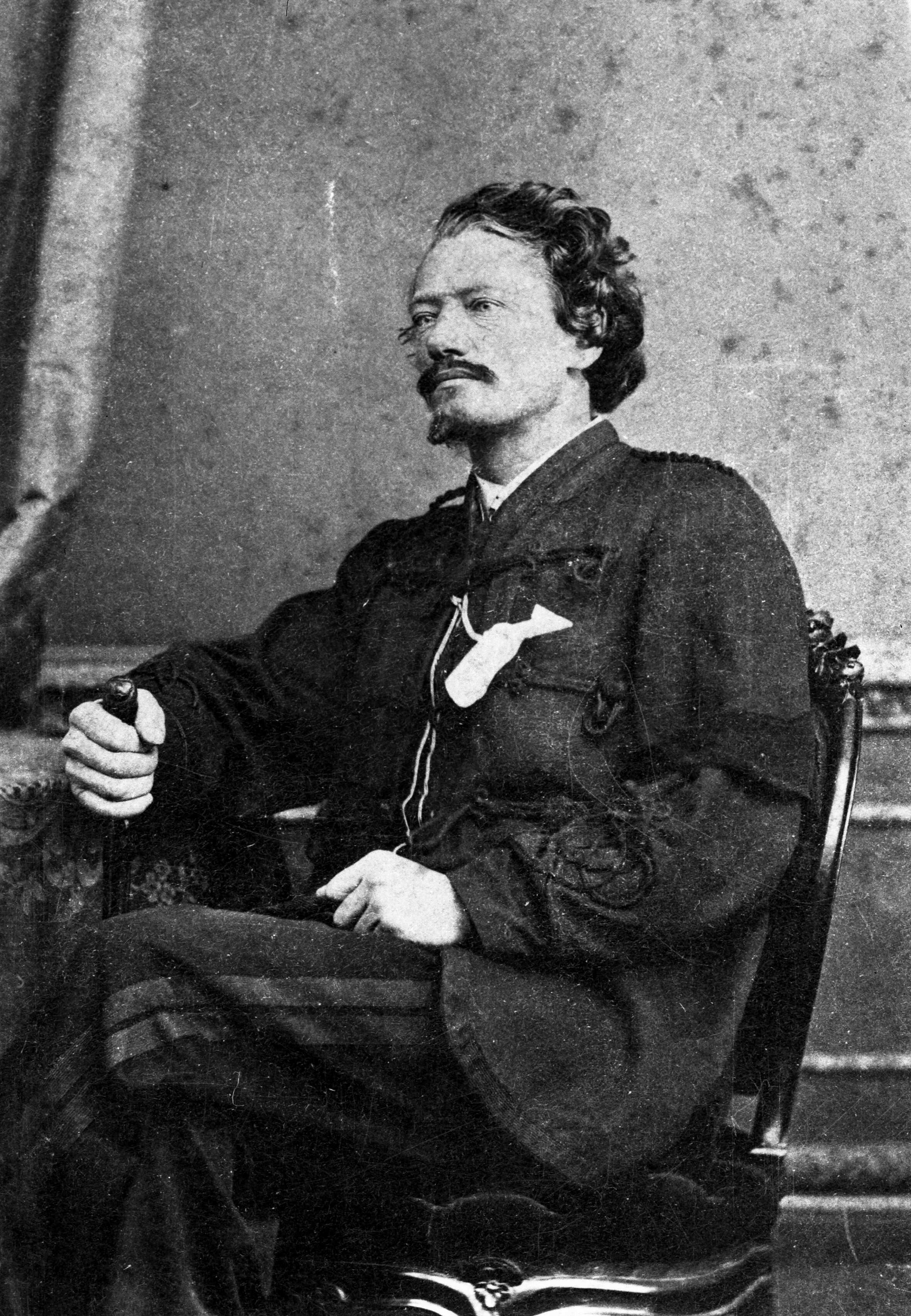
- Gustav von Tempsky, c. 1868
- Born: 15 February 1828; Braunsberg, East Prussia, today Braniewo, Poland
- Died: 7 September 1868 (aged 40); Te Ngutu o Te Manu ("The Bird's Beak", Titokowaru's main pā), New Zealand
- Occupations: Adventurer, artist, newspaper correspondent and soldier
- Spouse(s): Emilia Bell von Tempsky, née Ross, 1823–1900
- Children: Randal von Tempsky (1856 Bluefields, Nicaragua – 1898 Kula, Maui County, Hawaii), Louis von Tempsky (1858 Glasgow, Scotland – 1922 Waiakoa, Maui County, Hawaii), and Lina Kettle (von Tempsky) (1859 Sandhurst, Bendigo, Victoria, Australia – 1938 Napier, Hawke's Bay, North Island, New Zealand)
- Parent(s): Karoline Henriette Friederike Wilhelmine von Studnitz and Julius Louis von Tempsky

Gustavus Ferdinand von Tempsky (15 February 1828 – 7 September 1868) was a Prussian adventurer, artist, newspaper correspondent and soldier in New Zealand, Australia, California, Mexico and the Mosquito Coast of Central America. He was also an amateur watercolourist who painted the New Zealand bush and the military campaign.

== Early life ==
Gustav Ferdinand von Tempsky was born in Braunsberg, East Prussia, into a Prussian noble family. The family had branches in Silesia and elsewhere and had a long military tradition. Von Tempsky was brought up in Liegnitz in Lower Silesia. After this time, he was sent to a junior cadet school in Potsdam and then a cadet school in Berlin. He was a cousin of the German writer Valeska von Gallwitz.

In 1844, he was commissioned into his father's regiment in the Royal Prussian Army, possibly the Garde-Fusilier Regiment in which his brother, Benno Waldemar von Tempsky was a second lieutenant. In 1846, tiring of the routine, von Tempsky left the regiment after only nine months for the Prussian settlement on the Mosquito Coast of Central America. He accepted a commission to command a force of Mosquito Indians, which had been set up by Britain, but after his friend the British Consul-General slipped overboard and was devoured by alligators, he lost his taste for that adventure and headed to the American West.

In 1850, he went to the new California goldfields, but did not strike gold. In 1853, he returned to the Prussian colony, via Mexico, Guatemala, and Salvador, and later wrote a book, Mitla, about his journey.

He had been courting Emilia Ross Bell, the elder daughter of the British government agent from Scotland, James Stanislaus Bell, at the nearby British settlement of Bluefields (or Blewfields) before he left, but her father did not approve, probably because of his youth and lack of prospects. After his return, on 9 July 1855 at Bluefields, he married Emilia. In 1858 a son, Louis von Tempski, was born in Glasgow, Scotland.

The family emigrated from Liverpool to Victoria, Australia on the ship Sirocco, arriving in Port Melbourne on 1 August 1858, with two young sons, Randal age two, and Louis, age one. Two more children were registered as born on the Bendigo goldfields. The above-mentioned Louis von Tempsky's birth was registered at Sandhurst, Victoria, in 1858, and Lina von Tempsky, born 1859 at Sandhurst.

In Melbourne, von Tempsky made vigorous approaches to lead the proposed Trans-Continental Exploring Expedition, but his suit was ill-favoured by the committee, in the main because of the English prejudice of leading members, who chose Robert O'Hara Burke to lead. The venture became known as the Burke and Wills expedition, with the well-known and fatal outcomes. In the aftermath, von Tempsky took his family via the ship Benjamin Heape across the Tasman to New Zealand, departing Melbourne on 13 February 1862.

== Joins the Forest Rangers ==
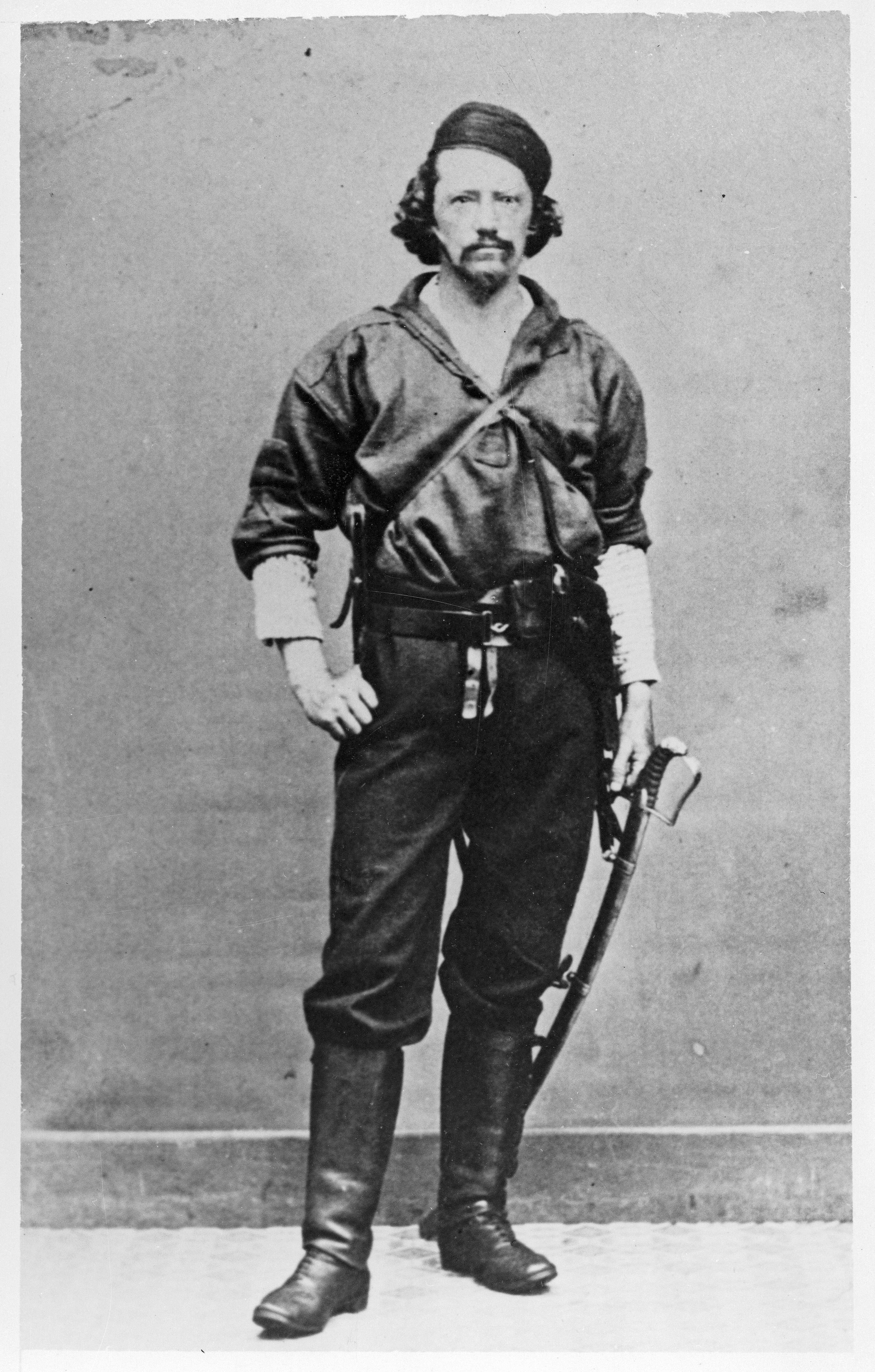
Photograph of Gustavus von Tempsky, circa 1868

On his arrival in New Zealand, von Tempsky settled on the Coromandel Peninsula as a gold-miner and newspaper correspondent.

Upon the outbreak of war in 1863 von Tempsky moved to Drury, just south of Auckland, where he was a correspondent for The Daily Southern Cross newspaper. Here he quickly struck up a friendship with Captain Jackson and the officers of the Forest Rangers and was soon invited to accompany them on their patrols. Soon afterwards, on 26 August 1863, Governor Grey responding to a suggestion by Captain Jackson naturalised von Tempsky as a British subject and made him an ensign in the Forest Rangers.

The Forest Rangers were an irregular volunteer force intended to take the war into the bush and to fight the enemy Māori on their own ground. Jackson was a cautious officer who was determined to give his men thorough training. Von Tempsky relied more on dash and élan; he was also a tireless self-publicist, avid for glory and admiration.

Very early on it was realised that the weapons and equipment used by the British Army were unsuited to irregular warfare in the dense wet New Zealand bush. With only about 100 men in the Forest Rangers at any one time, it was relatively easy to gather special equipment although in the early period in the Hunua Ranges, they were fobbed off with second-hand revolvers, most of which were unserviceable. When von Tempsky formed his own 2nd company for service in Taranaki, he had 30 or more large Bowie knives made by a cutler in Symonds Street, Auckland, from the spring steel of a cart. Only one of these knives is believed to still exist. The standard long weapon was the Calisher and Terry .54 carbine, called the Terry by the Rangers. With its short barrel, light weight, breech loading and waterproofed cartridge unit, it was the ideal weapon for the mainly close quarter fighting. The Taranaki Rangers carried just one Pattern 1853 Enfield rifle for sniping. Von Tempsky himself carried two Colt Navy .36 pistols and was able to obtain more of these smaller calibre revolvers for his unit. The Rangers also used the .44 calibre Beaumont–Adams five-shot revolver. Von Tempsky, is often portrayed as carrying a sabre which he carried unsheathed when expecting battle. The uniform and equipment were chosen to match the mobile role of the Rangers. The unit frequently carried only three days' rations in the field, being expected to live off the land to some extent.

In November 1863, the Forest Rangers were disbanded, not because they were unsuccessful but because their period of enlistment was finished. However Jackson was immediately authorised to form a new company along similar lines.

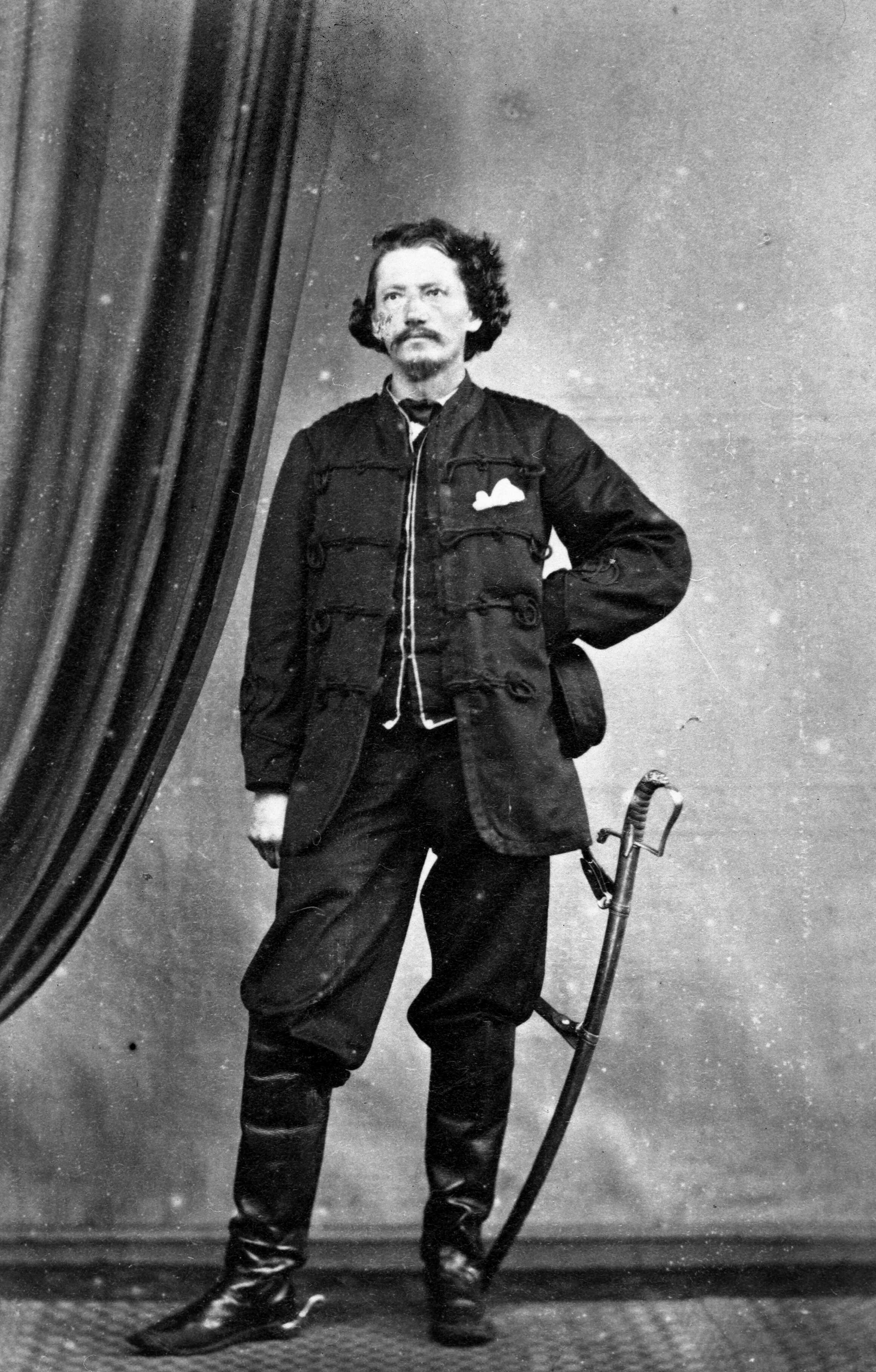
A formal portrait of Gustavus von Tempsky, probably taken by Hartley Webster about 1868

A few days later, Tempsky, called "Von" by some of his men, was promoted to captain and was also commissioned to raise a second company of Forest Rangers. From then on, he and Jackson were always in competition for men, resources, and glory.

During the early stages of the Waikato War, the Forest Rangers were used to protect the army's supply lines from marauding Māori, patrolling mainly in the Hunua Ranges south of Auckland and trying to intercept enemy war parties before they reached the Great South Road. It was during this time that von Tempsky emerged as a very effective leader who was able to inspire great loyalty in his men. He was known to the Māori as Manurau, "the bird that flits everywhere".

Later, the Forest Rangers were moved to the front and took part in the siege of Paterangi. It was during this period that they were involved in a dramatic rescue of some soldiers ambushed by the Māori while swimming in the Waikato River. Both Jackson and von Tempsky received a Mention in Despatches and Tempsky later painted a well known water colour showing himself in a very dramatic light. However, it was another officer, Charles Heaphy, who was awarded the Victoria Cross as a result of his bravery in this action.

The Forest Rangers were involved in the siege of Orakau, and then heavily implicated in the massacre which followed the breakout of the defenders.

By 1865, Jackson had resigned his commission and von Tempsky, now a major, was in command of the Forest Rangers. They were soon involved in the Second Taranaki War. This was a frustrating period because of the conflicting loyalties and objectives of Government forces. The commanders of the British Imperial Troops had had enough of fighting what they saw as unnecessary wars on behalf of the New Zealand Government. On the other hand, the New Zealand-raised units such as the Forest Rangers wanted to pursue the war with vigour. The deadlock was only broken when Governor Grey personally took command of the New Zealand forces. Von Tempsky, however, missed the subsequent action, being laid low by rheumatism.

== Court-martial ==
After a brief holiday in Auckland, von Tempsky took part in the Tauranga Campaign (although it is not clear in what capacity) and was present at the siege of Ōpōtiki. From there, he sailed to Wellington and resumed command of the Forest Rangers, who in the meantime had mutinied and were refusing to embark and sail for the East Cape War. Finding that, when he got there, he would be expected to serve under an officer he considered junior to himself, von Tempsky joined the mutiny and refused to accept any further orders.

He was arrested and court-martialled. The outcome could have been serious, but a change in government resulted in von Tempsky being given a second chance. While the bulk of the Forest Rangers went off to the East Cape, von Tempsky and the other mutineers were allowed to return to Wanganui, where he took part in McDonnell's and Chute's later Taranaki campaigns against the Hau Hau.

== The Taranaki Wars ==
The Forest Rangers were finally disbanded in Te Awamutu in mid-1866. Von Tempsky was immediately invited to take command of No. 5 Division of the Armed Constabulary. When Titokowaru's War broke out in 1868, von Tempsky and his division were very soon drafted and sent to the front.

On 12 July 1868, there occurred an incident which is still a matter of controversy among New Zealand historians. While in command of the fort at Pātea, von Tempsky was told that an unfinished redoubt about seven kilometres away was under heavy attack. Giving his second-in-command strict orders to hold the fort, he immediately rushed off on foot to join the battle. By the time he arrived, ten of the defenders were dead and another six injured, while the attackers were able to escape. In his report of 21 August 1868, Von Tempsky singled out the Marist priest Fr Jean-Baptiste Rolland for his bravery under fire as he tended the wounded – Catholic and Protestant – on the battle line. Fr Rolland was present at the battle at which von Tempsky was himself killed two weeks later.

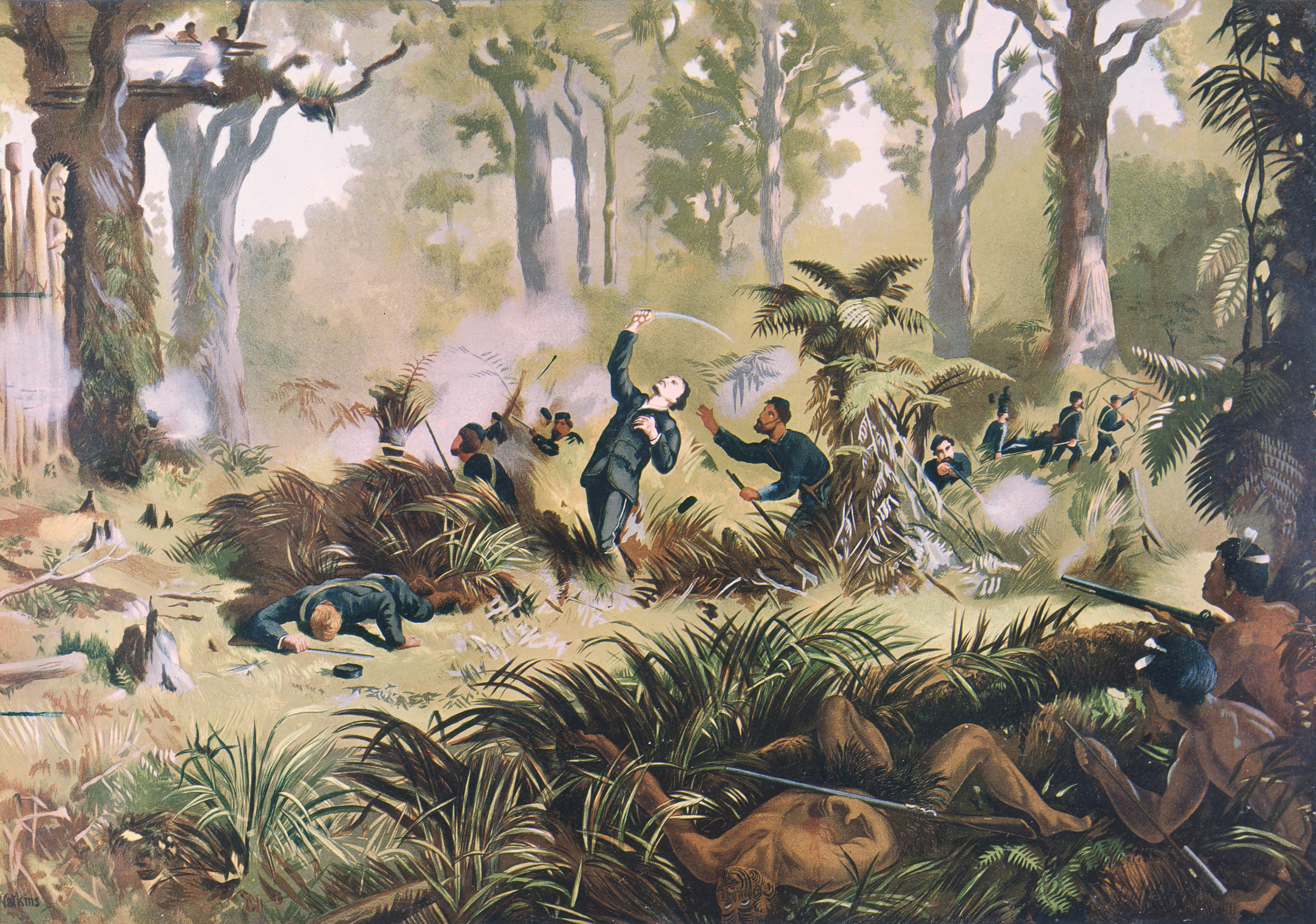
Gustavus von Tempsky's death in fighting against Titokowaru at Te Ngutu o te Manu, 1868 by Kennett Watkins

It was now September and the Government was anxious for a quick end to the conflict, and they pressured McDonnell into making a premature attack on Tītokowaru's main Pa, Te Ngutu o Te Manu or The Bird's Beak. On 7 September, the defenders were ready and waiting when the militia arrived and they came under heavy and accurate fire. Wisely, McDonnell very soon decided to withdraw, as he was well aware of the futility of trying to attack a defended Māori Pa. Von Tempsky protested and then began to advance on the Pa. Within a few moments, he was dead, killed by a bullet through his forehead, one of the fifty or so killed and wounded in the engagement.

James Shanaghan, an eyewitness, reported how von Tempsky died:

I had not gone far when a man of our company was shot. The Major went to his assistance, and was shot, the bullet entering the centre of his forehead. He fell dead on top of the man to whose assistance he was going. That was how von Tempsky died.

Although the corpses of some other soldiers were eaten, von Tempsky was held in high esteem by the Māori, and Kimble Bent said that Titokowaru ordered that von Tempsky's body be placed onto a funeral pyre in the centre of the marae. In 1965, Tonga Awikau, aged 101, described how as a child he had seen this cremation of 20 British dead, including Major von Tempsky.

The local Māori returned his sword sheath to his widow. It is now held by the Thomsons in Hawkes Bay.

After the loss of their leader, his unit fell apart. Many of the men mutinied and then deserted, refusing to serve under any other commander. At the end of September, the 5th Division of the Armed Constabulary was disbanded and never reformed.

== Family ==
His widow, Emilia, died in 1900. His daughter Lina lived in New Zealand. Two of his three sons, Ronald and Louis, moved to Hawaii, where they became ranchers. Louis managed the Haleakala Ranch. Armine von Tempsky, a daughter of Louis, became one of Hawaii's best-known writers. They sometimes used the alternative spelling of their name: Tempski.

More descendants of Gustavus von Tempsky remain in New Zealand, especially in the Hawkes Bay area through the Thomson family.

In 1948, Edmund L. Kowalczyk published in the Polish American Historical Association about Tempsky and erroneously claimed him as "One of the most colorful Polish Argonauts...born in Lignice 1828."
