= John Thornton Down =

Recipient of the Victoria Cross

John Thornton Down VC
- Ensign John Down
- Born: 2 March 1842; Fulham, London, England
- Died: 27 April 1866 (aged 24); Ōtāhuhu, New Zealand
- Burial place: Ōtāhuhu Old Cemetery
- Military career
- Allegiance: United Kingdom
- Branch: (United Kingdom of Great Britain and Ireland) British Army
- Rank: Ensign
- Units: 57th Regiment of Foot
- Conflicts: Second Taranaki War
- Awards: Victoria Cross

John Thornton Down VC (2 March 1842 – 27 April 1866) was a British Army officer and a recipient of the Victoria Cross, the highest award for gallantry in the face of the enemy that can be awarded to British and Commonwealth forces.

== Victoria Cross ==
Down was 21 years old, and an ensign in the 57th Regiment of Foot (later The Middlesex Regiment), British Army during the Second Taranaki War (one of the campaigns in the New Zealand Wars), when the following deed took place on 2 October 1863 at Poutoko, New Zealand for which he and Drummer Dudley Stagpoole were awarded the VC:

For their conduct at Pontoko, on the 2nd October, in rescuing a wounded comrade from the rebel Maori. They succeeded in bringing in the wounded man, who was lying at about fifty yards from the bush, although the enemy kept up a very heavy fire from the bush at short range, and also from behind fallen logs close at hand.

The man had been wounded during an engagement with the rebel natives, and Ensign Down, and Drummer Stagpoole, responded to the call of the Officer commanding the detachment of the Regiment for volunteers to bring him in.

The Medal for Distinguished Conduct in the Field has already been conferred on Drummer Stagpoole, for the energy and devotion which he displayed on the 25th September, 1863, at the affair near Kaipakopako, in having, though wounded in the head, twice volunteered and brought in wounded men.

Down died of fever at Camp Otahuhu on 27 April 1866. His grave in Ōtāhuhu (Holy Trinity) Churchyard is maintained by the New Zealand Ministry for Culture and Heritage.
