= Trevor Chute =

British Army general (1816-1886)

General Sir Trevor Chute KCB
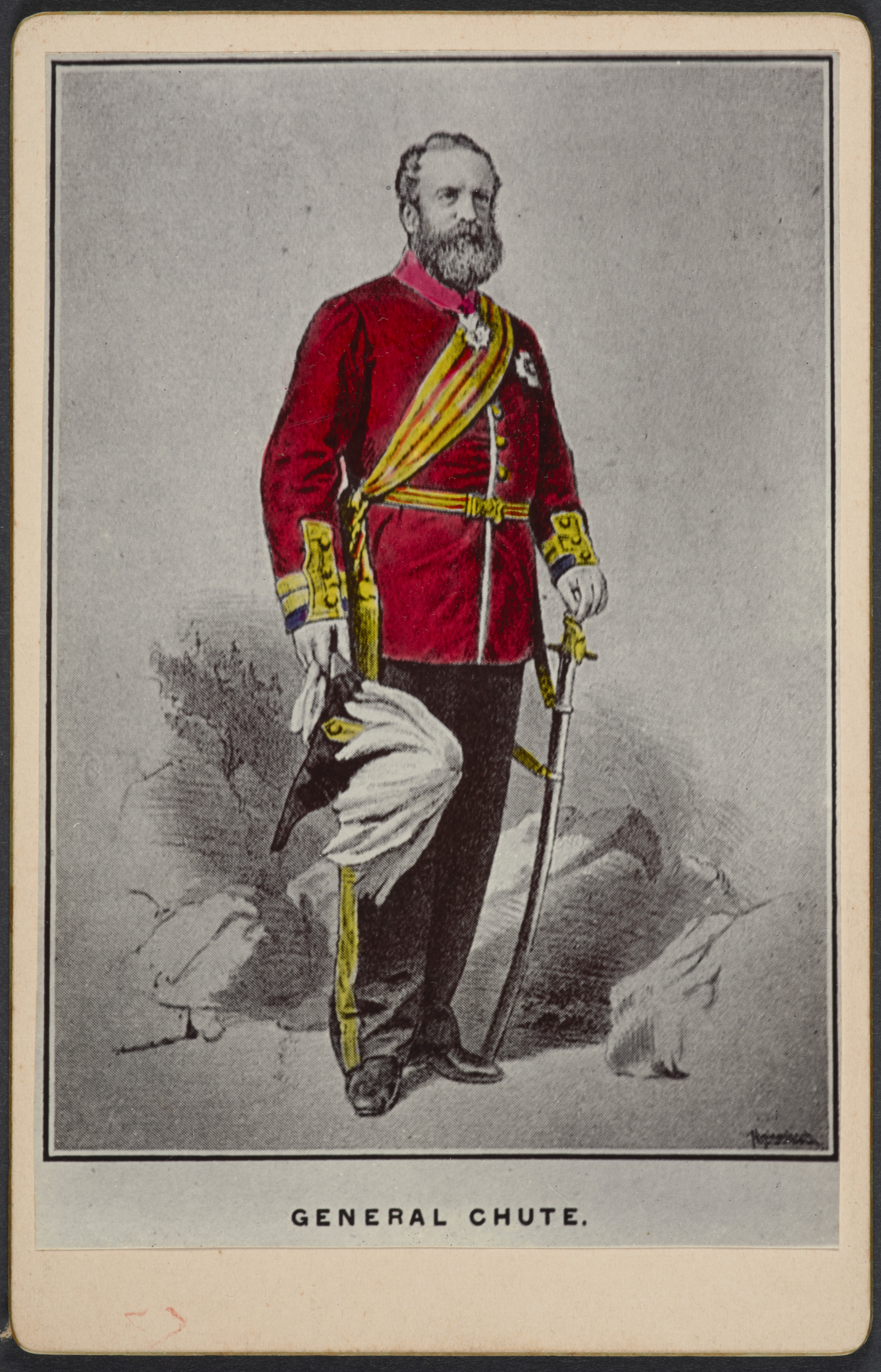
- General Chute, c. 1860
- Born: 31 July 1816
- Died: 12 March 1886 (aged 69)
- Military career
- Allegiance: United Kingdom
- Branch: British Army
- Service years: 1832–1881
- Rank: General
- Nickname: The Kerry Bull
- Conflicts: Indian Mutiny; New Zealand Wars; Second Taranaki War
- Awards: Knight Commander of the Order of the Bath

General Sir Trevor Chute, KCB (31 July 1816 – 12 March 1886) was an Anglo-Irish officer who served in the British Army during the Victorian era.

Born in County Kerry, Ireland, Chute joined the British Army in 1832. Posted to British India with the 70th Regiment, he helped deal with the Indian Mutiny of 1854. Sent to the Antipodes, he served in the New Zealand Wars and later in Australia. He returned to New Zealand in 1865 as a major general and commander of all British forces in the country. He led a four-week campaign during the Second Taranaki War to destroy Maori resistance in the Taranaki. The campaign was the last to be carried out in New Zealand by imperial troops. At the end of his service in New Zealand, he went back to Australia. Knighted in 1867, he returned to England in 1870 with the last of the Imperial forces garrisoning Australia. Promoted to General in 1877, he retired from the British Army four years later. He died in 1886 at Berkshire in England.

== Early life ==
Trevor Chute, born at Tralee in County Kerry, Ireland, on 31 July 1816, was the third son of Francis Chute and Mary Ann Chute (née Bomford). He entered the British Army in 1832 and was posted to the Ceylon Rifles. His overall robust appearance and powerful voice earned him the nickname "The Kerry Bull" among his soldiers. He later transferred to the 70th Regiment. By 1847 he had attained the rank of major, performing duties in Ireland in 1848 before being transferred with the regiment to India in 1849.

== India ==
In India, the regiment was based at Peshawar with Chute, having been promoted to lieutenant colonel, as its commander. He received a further promotion to colonel in 1854. During the Indian Mutiny of 1857, he led the rescue of trapped officers in Peshawar and dispersed the mutineers there. Moving to Lucknow, he organized the formation of flying columns to suppress the mutiny elsewhere in the country.

== New Zealand & Australia ==
In 1861, the 70th Regiment was posted to New Zealand. Arriving in the country in May 1861, Chute and his regiment was involved in the construction of the Great South Road, which extended from Drury to the Waikato River. During his service at this time, he was the president of the court of inquiry established to review the conduct of the 'battle' of Waireka. In March 1863 Chute was promoted to brigadier-general and posted to Australia where he had been appointed commander of British troops stationed there.

Chute returned to New Zealand as a major-general in September 1865, replacing General Duncan Cameron as commander of the British forces in the country. Chute also continued his role as commander of British forces in Australia. His arrival in New Zealand coincided with the Second Taranaki War. There were high tensions between colonists and Māori of Taranaki due to Governor George Grey's confiscation of land in the area despite a proclamation of peace. A series of ambushes and murders mounted by Māori against British troops and colonists from mid-1865 prompted Grey to task Chute with carrying out offensive operations against the Taranaki tribes. His task was made more difficult though the gradual withdrawal of British forces as the New Zealand Government took greater responsibility for its own defence. The 70th Regiment, Chute's former command, was one of the first units to leave New Zealand.

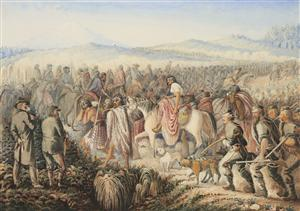
Gustavus von Tempsky's depiction of the January 1866 "forest march"

After developing a strategy for offensive operations with his primary subordinate in Taranaki, Colonel Henry Warre, Chute began his march from Wanganui on 3 January 1866 with a force of 620 men. Sweeping across the south and centre of Taranaki, his expedition, a mixture of British soldiers, local militia and kūpapa (pro-Government Māori), destroyed several, mostly undefended, villages between the Waitōtara River and Mount Egmont. His tactics were direct; little reconnaissance was carried out when preparing for attacks on villages and instead his force simply mounted a frontal assault, taking few prisoners. After destroying a traditional pā on 14 January, he then commenced a 9-day "forest march", a journey across the eastern base of Mount Egmont to New Plymouth. This march, which would have typically taken two or three days, almost resulted in disaster. He and his men became lost and exhausted their supplies. Reduced to eating their pack horses, a supply column brought relief and Chute and his men arrived in New Plymouth on 3 February 1866.

Following Chute's expedition, further campaigning was carried out in Taranaki but without British troops, which continued to be withdrawn from New Zealand. By 1867 Chute had moved with his headquarters to Melbourne in Australia. That same year he was created Knight Commander of the Order of the Bath, and on 9 July 1868, he married Ellen Browning, of Auckland. While in Australia he helped develop the local militia and oversaw the reduction of the British garrisons there. From late 1869 to early 1870, he was the administrator of New South Wales following the departure of Governor Sir John Young to Canada to become governor general there.

== Later life ==
In October 1870 Chute followed the last imperial troops stationed in Victoria back to England. Nearly three years later, following the death of Lieutenant General George Napier, he was appointed colonel of the 22nd Regiment. He was made a full general in 1877 and four years later was placed on the retired list. He died at Binfield, near Reading in Berkshire, on 12 March 1886, aged 69.
