= Valeska von Gallwitz =

German writer

Valeska von Gallwitz (January 22, 1833 in Glogau; † April 9, 1888) was a German writer.

== Life ==
Born Agnes Valeska Eugenie von Tempsky from a distinguished noble family, her father Karl Gustav von Tempsky and her brothers were (as were most of their ancestors) officers of the Prussian army. The family originated in Kashubia in western Prussia, and some moved to Silesia some time after 1415, which in 1741 the province itself was ceded to Prussia by the Habsburg Empire during the War of Austrian Succession. Her cousin was the distinguished New Zealand Major Gustavus von Tempsky.

Valeska von Tempsky grew up in Glogau and married August von Gallwitz in 1855 in Jawor (German Jauer). Von Gallwitz († 1914 in Breslau) was squire (or Gutsherr) in the village of Dzierżno near Gliwice. The pair lived in Breslau, Hanover and Berlin.

In 1868 she began to write. Her first novel Editha and other stories was published in 1876 by Münchmeyer-Verlag (publishing house) in Dresden under the pseudonym Eugen Valeski. Another pen name she used was C. Michael.

The Goethe- und Schiller-Archiv (Goethe and Schiller archives) in Weimar has the correspondence of Valeska von Gallwitz with the writer and editor Joseph Kürschner from the years 1877 to 1885.

== Works ==
- Editha, Roman, in: Deutsches Familienblatt I, Dresden 1876, Verlag H. G. Münchmeyer
- Der Talisman der Großmutter, Erzählung, in: Feierstunden am häuslichen Herde, Dresden 1876, Verlag H. G. Münchmeyer
- Eine Stiefmutter, Erzählung, in: Deutsches Familienblatt II, Dresden 1877, Verlag H. G. Münchmeyer
- Dem Tode abgerungen, Novelle, in: Deutsches Familienblatt II, Dresden 1877, Verlag H. G. Münchmeyer
- Jelka, Novelle, Stuttgart 1878, Verlag Richter und Kappler
- Das Schloß am Roche Malon, Roman, Freiburg 1879, Verlag Kiepert
- Jelka, Roman. 2. Aufl., Falkenberg O/S. 1882, Verlag Bartelt
- Dem Tode abgerungen, Roman, (2 vols.) Freiburg 1880, Verlag Kiepert
- Zwei Frauenherzen, Charakterbild, Freiburg 1880, Verlag Kiepert
- Aus Palast und Hütte, Novellen, Leipzig 1881, Verlag Schulze & Co
- Magdalena, Roman, Breslau 1883, Verlag Schottländer

== Literature ==
- Gothaisches Genealogisches Taschenbuch der Adeligen Häuser. Teil B, Gotha 1933, Verlag Justus Perthes
- Sophie Pataky: Lexikon deutscher Frauen der Feder, Eine Zusammenstellung der seit dem Jahre 1840 erschienen Werke weiblicher Autoren, nebst Biographieen der lebenden und einem Verzeichnis der Pseudonyme. Berlin 1898, Verlagsbuchhandlung Carl Pataky
- Volker Griese: Karl May. Personen in seinem Leben.
- Roland Schmid: "Eine Gräfin von Gallwitz", in: Mitteilungen der Karl-May-Gesellschaft. Nr. 70 (1986), Seite 24
