= Te Teira Manuka =

Māori nobleman (1812–1882)

- Te Teira Manuka photographed in the 1860s

Personal details
- Born: c. 1812 Waitara, Taranaki Whenua
- Died: 16 September 1882 (aged 70) New Plymouth, Taranaki County, New Zealand

Te Teira Manuka (c. 1812 – 16 September 1882), also known as Pokikake Te Teira, was a Taranaki Māori nobleman. A rangatira of Te Āti Awa, he was the leader of its Puke-Kowhatu hapū. However, he is best remembered for his debated sale of the Waitara block to the Crown as negotiated by Governor Thomas Gore Browne, in violation of customary title and Te Āti Awa tikanga. The controversial sale led to a crisis in the entire region, and subsequently caused the First Taranaki War.

== Life ==
Not a great deal is recorded of Te Teira Manuka's early life within Pākehā historiography. He was the son of Tamati Tarepa, of the Puke-Kowhatu hapū in Waitara. Te Teira Manuka was married to Neta Te Rangiwawai, and had a brother called Wetereri Te Manu-a-Tiki.

=== Genealogy ===
To deter claims he was not a legitimate rangatira to sell land of his own volition, Te Teira Manuka published his whakapapa in the New-Zealander on 5 May 1860. In the article, he attacked Wiremu Kīngi Te Rangitāke, the paramount rangatira of Te Āti Awa, and falsely claimed that Kīngi had no ancestral right to the land. Instead Kīngi claimed that the land was purely his by right of being a direct descendent of Kahuitu.

Te Teira Manuka was well-educated. According to his father, Tamati Tarepa, Te Teira Manuka could drive a carriage, he could plough, and had become learned in mathematics. He was also literate, as evident by his writing letters in Māori to senior Crown figures.

== Involvement in First Taranaki War (1859–60) ==
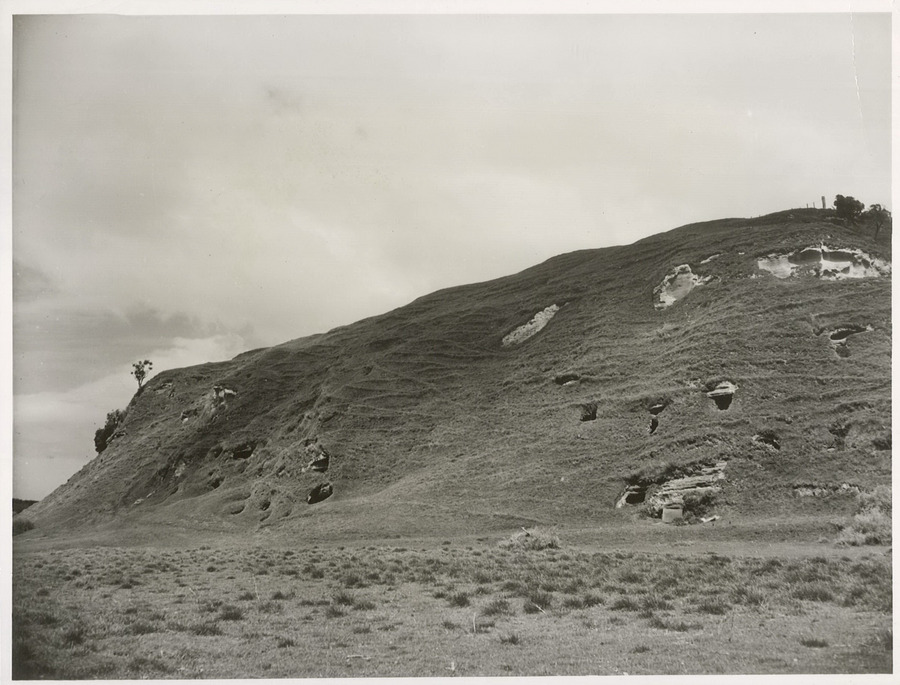
The abandoned Otīhoi pā at Waitōtara, Taranaki, in 1948. Te Teira Manuka's resided there from 1858.

Te Teira Manuka's involvement in the First Taranaki War was prefaced by his rocky relationship with the more senior rangatira Wiremu Kīngi. Kīngi had denied Te Teira Manuka the right to marry a close relative of his to a woman he had been promised, possibly because the marriage would have entitled Te Teira Manuka to greater land rights. According to Ann Parsonson, an indignant Te Teira Manuka sought to create difficulties for his people at large, feeling his family had been greatly wronged by Kīngi.

Te Teira Manuka first became interested in selling land at Waitara in 1858, following the death of fellow rangatira Te Waitere Kātātore. This had led to conflict between Wiremu Kīngi and Īhāia Te Kirikūmara, the leader of the Ōtaraua hapū, who challenged Kīngi for supremacy over Te Āti Awa. Ihāia had tried three times in vain to sell land at Waitara to the Crown, in 1844, 1847, and 1850, but each time Wiremu Kīngi had vetoed such proposals. Te Teira Manuka soon established himself at Otīhoi, a great pā at Waitōtara.

=== Attempt to sell land at Waitara ===
In 1859, after politician Donald McLean announced on behalf of Governor Thomas Gore Browne that he would "would buy no man’s land without his consent", and would not buy "unless [a land owner] owned part of it", Te Teira Manuka eagerly offered to sell the Pekapeka block of modern-day Waitara. The small parcel of land sat on the south bank of the Waitara river, was 600 acres (2.4 km^{2}) in size, and was well-suited to English settler ambitions in the area. Hopes were raised that the sale would make a precedent for vast land purchases across northern Taranaki.

Te Teira had been interested in selling up his interests there before in accordance to English law rather than tikanga Māori. He wrote to Browne and announced that he, Īhāia Te Kirikūmara and his brother Tamati, wished to sell up in accordance to Crown custom. Immediately upon hearing this, an outraged Wiremu Kīngi protested. As one person could not legally sell collectively owned land under tikanga Māori, the senior Kīngi wrote to the Governor to deter him. In his letter Kīngi said “I will not permit the sale of Waitara to the Pakeha. Waitara is in my hands, I will not give it up…. However, in correspondence with Robert Parris on 29 November 1859, Kingi claimed that Teira indeed held legal title to the land but would not let him sell it as he did not wish for the land to be disturbed.

The Governor chose to side with Te Teira and honour his proposal, and oppose Kīngi's resistance of English Law's expansion. Browne travelled to Taranaki; McLean and Parris went to Waitara to negotiate with Te Teira Manuka, and arrived on 6 March 1860. Knowing what they were proposing was a breach of tikanga, McLean and Parris advised Te Teira Manuka that they would communicate with him surreptitiously. They would fire a gun in their lodgings in Waitara when the Governor arrived, which would be a symbol for Te Teira Manuka to meet with them. The men contacted also Wiremu Kīngi, and tried in vain to get him to consent to a full sale of Waitara, but did not inform him of Te Teira Manuka's intentions.

Two days later, Te Teira Manuka met with Parris, McLean and Governor Browne at Parris' house, and reportedly told the latter: "listen, O Governor, Mr. Richmond, and Mr. M'Lean. There is no man, not even a minister, equal to Mr. Parris in courage in carrying words among the Maoris during war [in efforts to make peace]. Now, I say I give up Waitara to Mr. Parris, for him to give to you, O Governor, and to Mr. Richmond, and Mr. M'Lean— he will give it to you all... I will give to you, O Governor, my peace of land at Waitara." When Browne asked if the land was genuinely his to sell, Te Teira Manuka claimed it was entirely so. The deal was finalised shortly then and there, and Te Teira Manuka gave Browne his kaitaka to cement the transaction.

The entire deal was soon announced, to the fury of most Te Āti Awa. War broke out in March 1860. Eight months after the deal Te Teira was paid £100 (approximately NZD$14,649.81 in 2024) for the Pekapeka block. Later reports suggest that he had been bribed a further £150 in March 1862 to maintain his loyalty.

== Later life ==
Te Teira Manuka had one son, Parris Taylor (1860 – January 1943), who was born just as the First Taranaki War was beginning. Taylor was named after Robert Parris, civil commissioner of the Pākehā settlement in Taranaki.

He died on 16 September 1882, in New Plymouth, in what was then Taranaki County, reportedly aged seventy.
