= List of New Zealand Wars Victoria Cross recipients =

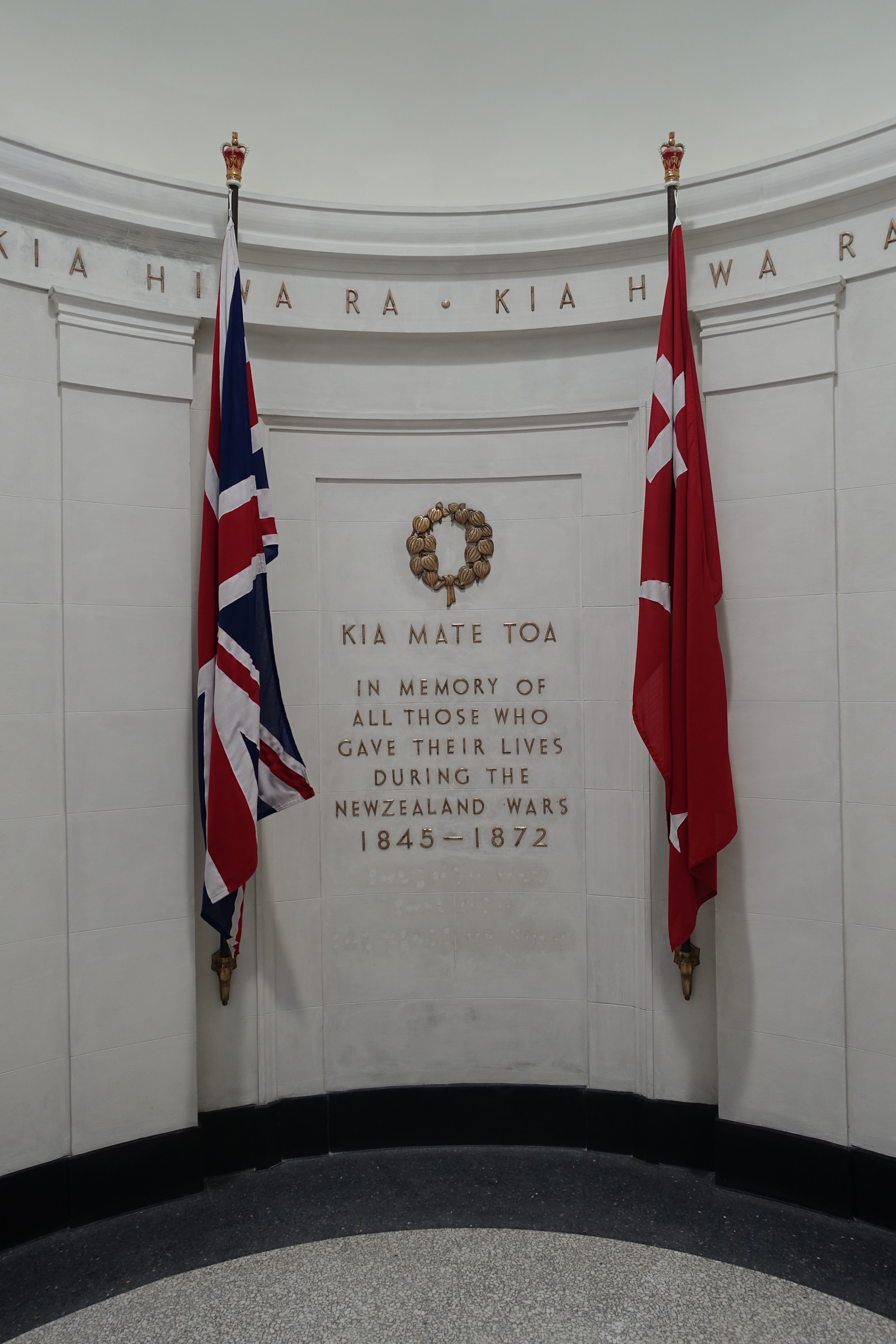
A memorial to those who died in the New Zealand Wars, located in the Auckland War Memorial Museum

The Victoria Cross (VC) was awarded to 15 recipients for action during the New Zealand Wars. The VC is a military decoration awarded for valour "in the face of the enemy" to members of armed forces of some Commonwealth countries and previous British Empire territories. It takes precedence over all other orders, decorations and medals; it may be awarded to a person of any rank in any service and to civilians under military command. The award was officially constituted when Queen Victoria issued a warrant under the Royal sign-manual on 29 January 1856, which was gazetted on 5 February 1856. The order was backdated to 1854 to recognise acts of valour during the Crimean War.

Originally, the VC was not available to colonial troops, even if under British command, but this changed in 1867. The extension was made following a recommendation for gallantry regarding colonial soldier Major Charles Heaphy for action in the land wars in 1864. He was operating under British command and the VC was gazetted in 1867. Later that year, the Government of New Zealand assumed full responsibility for operations but no further recommendations for the Victoria Cross were raised for local troops who distinguished themselves in action. Following gallant actions by three New Zealand soldiers in November 1868 and January 1869 during the land wars, an Order in Council on 10 March 1869 created a "Distinctive Decoration" for members of the local forces without seeking permission from the Secretary of State for the Colonies. Although the Governor was chided for exceeding his authority, the Order in Council was ratified by the Queen. The title "Distinctive Decoration" was later replaced by the title New Zealand Cross.

The New Zealand Wars were a series of conflicts that took place in New Zealand between 1845 and 1872. The two conflicts where soldiers were awarded the Victoria Cross were the First Taranaki War of 1860–1861 and the Waikato-Hauhau Māori War of 1863–1866. The First Taranaki War was fought over land rights on New Zealand's North Island. The local Colonial Governor had set up a policy whereby the British Government could buy local land, and anyone refusing to sell their land would be committing treason against the Crown. When the Te Atiawa refused to sell their land, the British Army attacked on 17 March 1860, starting the First Taranaki War. After a series of sieges by the British, a truce was signed with the Māori people in March 1861; the disputed land became British-owned territory but it remained in possession of the Māori people. The First Taranaki War ended in a stalemate over the one area of disputed land. By 1863 the influx of settlers and consequent demand for land led to further conflict. In July 1863, the British Army and the Auckland Militia launched the Invasion of Waikato against the forces of Tāwhiao and the Māori King Movement. The British expelled the Māori people from their lands, swiftly moving south, culminating in the defeat and flight of Tāwhiao at Ōrākau in March 1864. The British pursued him across the country as far as the fourth Waikato defensive line, which later became the border of King Country.

== Recipients ==
Recipients	Unit	Campaign	Date	Location
John Down	57th Regiment of Foot	Second Taranaki War	2 October 1863	Poutoko, New Zealand
Charles Heaphy	Auckland Militia	Invasion of Waikato	11 February 1864	Paterangi Pa, New Zealand
John Lucas	40th Regiment of Foot	First Taranaki War	18 March 1861	Waitara, New Zealand
William Manley	Royal Artillery	Tauranga Campaign	29 April 1864	Tauranga, New Zealand
Edward McKenna	65th Regiment of Foot	Invasion of Waikato	7 September 1863	Cameron Town, New Zealand
John McNeill	107th Bengal Infantry Regiment	Invasion of Waikato	30 March 1864	Ōhaupō, New Zealand
Samuel Mitchell	HMS Harrier	Tauranga Campaign	29 April 1864	Tauranga, New Zealand
John Murray	68th Regiment of Foot	Tauranga Campaign	21 June 1864	Tauranga, New Zealand
William Odgers	HMS Niger	First Taranaki War	28 March 1860	Omata, New Zealand
Arthur Pickard	Royal Artillery	Invasion of Waikato	20 November 1863	Rangiriri, New Zealand
John Ryan	65th Regiment of Foot	Invasion of Waikato	7 September 1863	Cameron Town, New Zealand
Hugh Shaw	18th Regiment of Foot	Second Taranaki War	24 January 1865	Nukumaru, New Zealand
Frederick Smith	43rd Regiment of Foot	Tauranga Campaign	21 January 1864	Tauranga, New Zealand
Dudley Stagpoole	57th Regiment of Foot	Second Taranaki War	2 October 1863	Poutoko, New Zealand
William Temple	Royal Artillery	Invasion of Waikato	20 November 1863	Rangiriri, New Zealand
