= Anne Maria Barkly =

British botanist (1838–1932)

Anne Maria Barkly, Lady Barkly
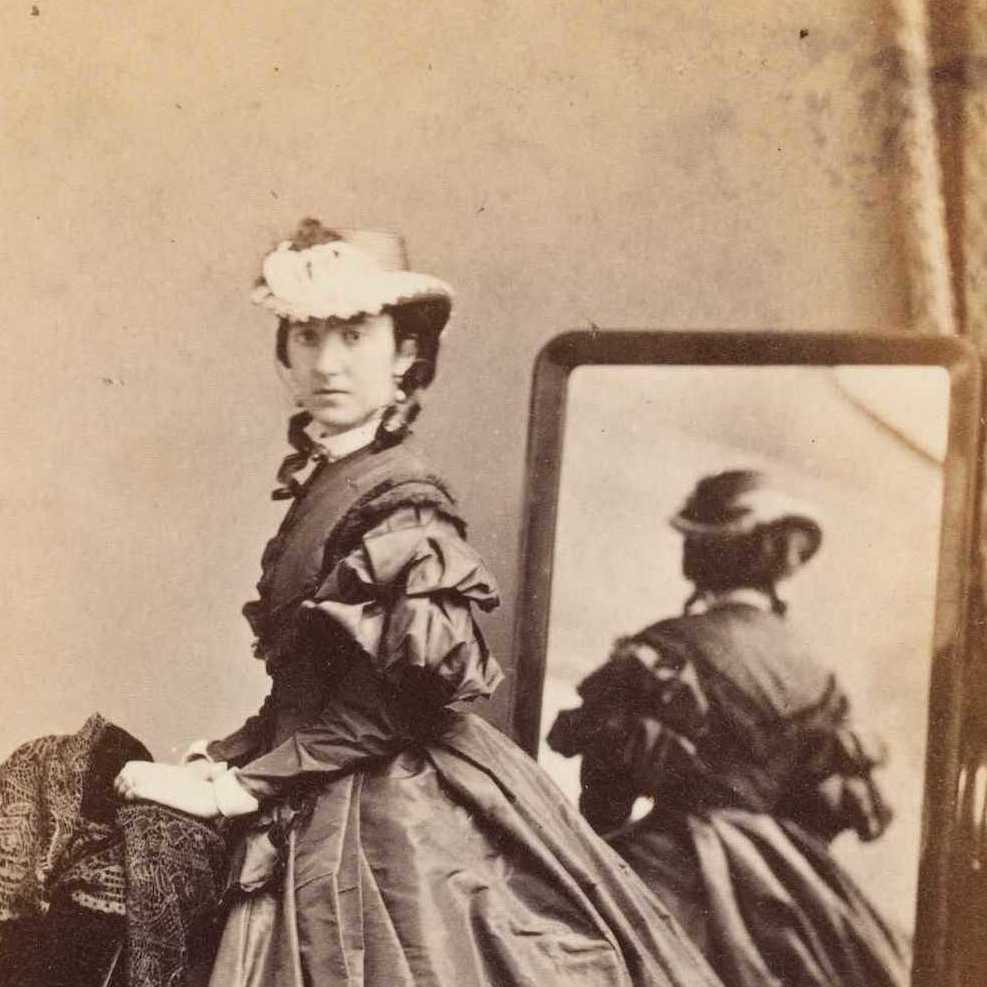
- in 1863 by Batchelder & O'Neill
- Born: Anne Maria Pratt; 1837
- Died: 1932 (aged 94–95)
- Occupation: botanist
- Known for: study of ferns
- Spouse: Sir Henry Barkly
- Parent(s): Sir Thomas Simson Pratt; Frances Agnes Cooper

Anne Maria Barkly, Lady Barkly (née Pratt; 1837–1932) was an Australian botanist active in the flora of Mauritius and South Africa.

== Life ==
Barkly was born in Edinburgh in 1838. Melbourne became a city ten years later. She lived for twelve years in India before moving to Australia with her parents Frances Agnes (born Cooper) and Major General Thomas Simson Pratt. Her father was in command of the British forces in Australia. He arrived in Melbourne in January 1860.

She married Sir Henry Barkly, the governor of Victoria, in 1860. He was 45 and she was his second wife; his first wife, Elizabeth Helen Timins, had died in Victoria in 1857 after childbirth. The wedding was reported as a "secret wedding" but it attracted 200–300 onlookers and they were married by Charles Perry, the Bishop of Melbourne. The wedding was at Christ Church, South Yarra which had been completed in 1857. She and her husband honeymooned at the governor's residence whilst her father went to New Zealand to take command during the First Taranaki War.

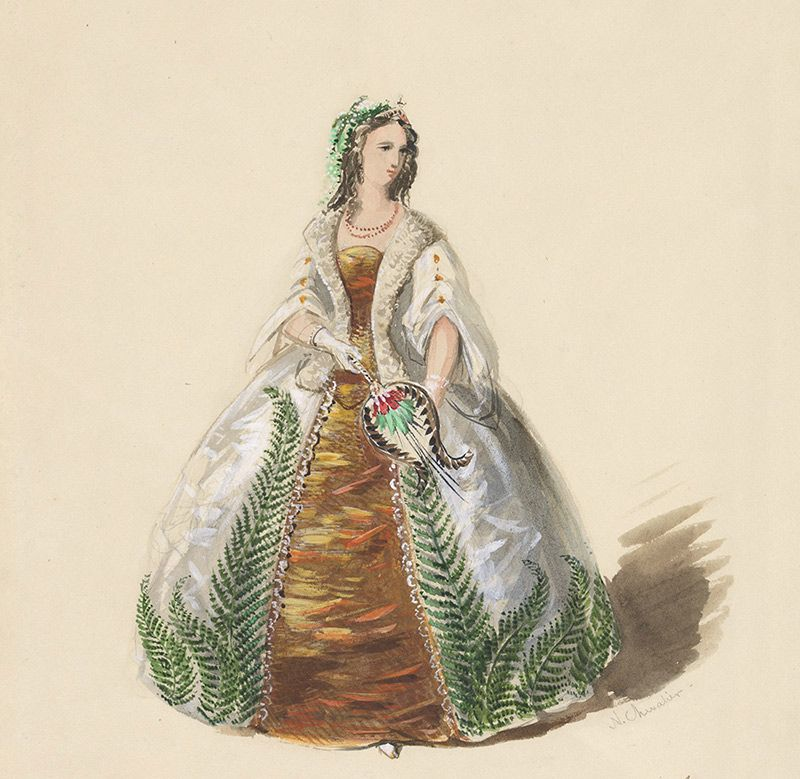
Lady Barkly's fern-inspired fancy dress costume design by Nicholas Chevalier

In the year that she married, she had a dress design created for her by the Russian-born artist Nicholas Chevalier. It was intended as fancy dress and featured fern-inspired designs; its construction included sheepskin and gemstones. The dress has been cited as an example of pteridomania. Chevalier also designed a lyrebird-inspired fan as an accessory to the outfit. It appears that she never wore the dress as she chose to appear as a "Marquise of the Court of Louis XV" for the Mayor's Ball in 1863. Chevalier's dress design was rejected by Barkly but they collaborated to work on a present for the newly married Princess of Wales. The present was from the women of Victoria and like the dress the silver and gold flower stand featured icons of Australian life.

Her husband was suddenly appointed as the governor of British Mauritius in the spring of 1863. This enabled her to record botanic specimens.

She corresponded with Sir Joseph Dalton Hooker at Kew Gardens about the botanical specimens she was collecting. She told him in 1869 of specimens that had been sent to her from Singapore.

In 1870, her husband became the first governor of the Cape of Good Hope. He collected botanical specimens and so did she. She and her step-daughter Emily Blanche Barkly recorded the findings.

In 1875, she published A Revised List of the Ferns of South Africa, which she had compiled.

== Death and legacy ==
Both Barkly herself, her husband's first wife Elizabeth and Emily Blanche Barkly were recognised as botanists in the Dictionary of British and Irish Botanists. She died in 1932. Some of her ferns are in the Natural History Museum and some of her botanic drawings are at Kew Gardens.
