= Kehu (disambiguation) =

Kehu may refer to:

- Kehu, New Zealand Māori guide in the South Island in the mid-19th century
- Kehu language
- Te Kehu, New Zealand Māori woman, one of the few female signatories of the Treaty of Waitangi
