= John Lucas (VC) =

British Army soldier and recipient of the Victoria Cross

John Lucas VC
- Born: 1826; Bagenalstown, Ireland
- Died: 29 February 1892 (aged 65–66); Dublin, Ireland
- Burial place: St James's Church and Graveyard, Dublin, Ireland
- Military career
- Allegiance: United Kingdom
- Branch: (United Kingdom of Great Britain and Ireland) British Army
- Rank: Sergeant Major
- Units: 40th (2nd Somersetshire) Regiment of Foot
- Conflicts: New Zealand Wars: First Taranaki War
- Awards: Victoria Cross; New Zealand War Medal; Long Service and Good Conduct Medal

John Lucas VC (1826 – 29 February 1892) was a British Army soldier and a recipient of the Victoria Cross, the highest award for gallantry in the face of the enemy that can be awarded to British and Commonwealth forces. He was the first member of the 40th Foot to be awarded the VC.

== Early life ==
Lucas as born in Clashganny, Bagenalstown, County Carlow in 1826.

== Victoria Cross ==
Colour Sergeant John Lucas, 40th (2nd Somersetshire) Regiment of Foot (later part of the South Lancashire Regiment – The Prince of Wales's Volunteers), was approximately 35 years old:

On the 18th of March, 1861, Colour-Serjeant Lucas acted as Sergeant of a party of the 40th Regiment, employed as skirmishers to the right of No. 7, Redoubt, and close to the Huirangi Bush, facing the left of the positions occupied by the natives. At about 4 o'clock P.M., a very heavy and well-directed fire was suddenly opened upon them from the Bush, and the high ground on the left. Three men being wounded simultaneously, two of them mortally, assistance was called for in order to have them carried to the rear: a file was immediately sent, but had scarcely arrived, when one of them fell, and Lieutenant Rees was wounded at the same time. Colour-Serjeant Lucas, under heavy fire from the rebels, who were not more than thirty yards distant, immediately ran up to the assistance of this Officer, and sent one man with him to the rear. He then took charge of the arms belonging to the killed and wounded men, and maintained his position until the arrival of supports under Lieutenants Gibson and Whelan.

The action was part of the First Taranaki War during the New Zealand Wars. This campaign started over a disputed land sale at Waitara. In December 1860 British forces under Major General Thomas Simson Pratt carried out sapping operations against a major Māori defensive line called Te Arei ("The barrier") on the west side of the Waitara River and inland from Waitara, which was barring the way to the historic hill pā of Pukewairangi. The 18 March was the last day before a truce was declared.

== Later career and life ==
By then promoted to sergeant-major, Lucas received his Victoria Cross from Lieutenant-General Duncan Cameron at Ellerslie Racecourse in Auckland, on 2 October 1862.

He died in Dublin on 29 February 1892 and is buried there in St. James churchyard.

== See also ==
- List of New Zealand Wars Victoria Cross recipients
