= William Odgers =

Royal Navy sailor

William Odgers VC
- Born: 14 February 1834; Falmouth, Cornwall
- Died: 20 December 1873 (aged 39); Saltash, Cornwall
- Burial place: St Stephen's Churchyard, Saltash
- Military career
- Allegiance: United Kingdom
- Branch: Royal Navy
- Rank: Quartermaster
- Units: HMS Niger
- Conflicts: New Zealand Wars; First Taranaki War
- Awards: Victoria Cross

William Odgers VC (14 February 1834 – 20 December 1873) was a Royal Navy sailor and a recipient of the Victoria Cross, the highest award for gallantry in the face of the enemy that can be awarded to British and Commonwealth forces.

== Early life ==
Odgers was born in Falmouth, Cornwall, on 14 February 1834.

== Victoria Cross ==
Odgers was 26 years old, and a leading seaman in the Royal Navy during the First Taranaki War in New Zealand when the following deed took place for which he was awarded the VC.

On 28 March 1860 at Omata, Leading Seaman Odgers of HMS Niger displayed conspicuous gallantry when a party of officers, sailors and marines from the ship stormed Kaipopo Pa during operations against Maori insurgents. His citation read:

On the 28th of March, 1860, William Odgers displayed conspicuous gallantry at the Storming of a Pah during operations against Rebel Natives in New Zealand; having been the first to enter it under a heavy fire, and having assisted in hauling down the enemy's colours.

This was the first VC won in New Zealand. A few days later, HMS Niger bombarded civilian fishing villages at Warea, about 40 kilometres south of New Plymouth, where the defeated Maori force had regrouped, with cannon and rockets.

This action was labelled a "fictional triumph" and a myth by New Zealand revisionist historian James Belich. However Nigel Prickett embellished the action as a catastrophic defeat for southern insurgents who virtually no casualties Kaipopo Pa.

== Later life ==
Odgers later achieved the rank of quartermaster, and was in the Coast Guard Service. He died in Saltash, Cornwall, on 20 December 1873, having been innkeeper at the Union Inn since 1868.

His medal is displayed at Sheesh Mahal Museum, Patiala, India.

== See also ==
- List of New Zealand Wars Victoria Cross recipients
