= HMS Niger (1846) =

Sloop of the Royal Navy

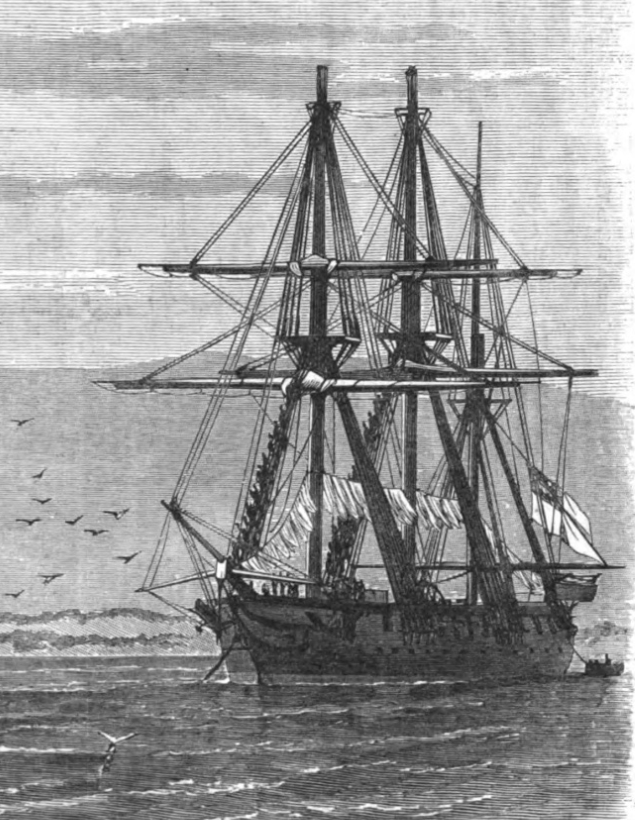
- HMS Niger at Vera Crux (Illustrated London News)

History

United Kingdom
- Name: HMS Niger
- Ordered: 20 February 1845
- Builder: Woolwich Dockyard
- Laid down: May 1845
- Launched: 18 November 1846
- Honours and awards: Crimea/Black Sea 1854 - 55, China 56 - 58, New Zealand 1860
- Fate: Sold to Castle in 1869 for breaking

General characteristics
- Class & type: Niger-class
- Type: wooden screw sloop (later "corvette")
- Displacement: 1,072 6/94 bm; 1,454 long tons (1,477 t)
- Length: 194 ft 4 in (59.23 m) gundeck; 170 ft 11.75 in (52.1145 m) keel reported for tonage
- Beam: 34 ft 8 in (10.57 m) maximum, 34 ft 4 in (10.46 m) beam reported for tonnage
- Draught: 15 ft 6 in (4.72 m)
- Depth of hold: 21 ft 5.5 in (6.541 m)
- Installed power: 1002 indicated horsepower
- Propulsion: 4-cylinder horizontal single-expansion steam engine; Single 12 ft 6 in (3.81 m) screw
- Sail plan: Full-rigged ship
- Speed: 10.25 kn (18.98 km/h) under power
- Complement: 160
- Armament: As built: 2 × 56-pdr (87cwt) guns; 4 × 8-inch/68-pdr (65cwt) guns; 2 × 32-pdr (17cwt) guns; From 1850: 14 × 32-pdr (17cwt) guns; From 1856: 14 × 32-pdr (17cwt) guns; 1 × 68-pdr gun

HMS Niger was originally slated to be built as a Sampson designed sloop; however, she was ordered as a First-Class sloop with screw propulsion on 20 February 1845 to be built at Woolwich Dockyard, along the design developed by Oliver Lang and with a hull like the Basilisk designed paddle sloops. Her armament and engine were to be like the Encounter Design building at Pembroke. A second vessel (Florentia) was ordered on 26 March 1846 but after her keel was laid at Pembroke Dockyard, her construction was suspended on 6 October 1846 then cancelled three years later, on 22 May 1849. Niger She conducted important propulsion trials, finally proving the superiority of screw propulsion and served in West Africa, the Crimea, China, the East Indies and Australia. She took part in the New Zealand wars in 1860 and was sold for breaking in 1869.

Niger was the third named vessel since its introduction for a 33-gun fifth rate launched at Sheerness on 25 September 1759, converted to a prison ship in 1810, renamed Negro in 1813 and sold on 29 September 1814.

Florentia introduced this name to the Royal Navy.

== Construction and specifications ==
Niger’s keel was laid in May 1845 at Woolwich Dockyard Slip No. 3 and launched on 18 November 1846. Her gundeck was 185 ft 0 in (56.39 m) with her keel length reported for tonnage calculation of 162 ft 0 in (49.38 m) estimated. Her breadth was 32 ft 8 in (9.96 m). She had a depth of hold of 21 ft 6 in (6.55 m). Her builder’s measure tonnage was 911 tons. In 1848 her gundeck was lengthen at Deptford Dockyard to 194 ft 4 in (59.23 m) with her keel length reported for tonnage calculation of 170 ft 11.75 in (52.1145 m). Her maximum breadth was now 34 ft 8 in (10.57 m) with 34 ft 4 in (10.46 m) reported for tonnage. Her depth of hold was now 21 ft 5.5 in (6.541 m). Her minimum draught was 15 ft 3 in (4.65 m) forward and 16 ft 3 in (4.95 m) aft. Her builder’s measured tonnage increased to 1,072 tons with a displacement of 1,496 tons.

Her machinery was supplied by Maudslay, Sons & Field of Lambeth. She shipped rectangular fire tube boilers. Her engine was a 4-cylinder horizontal single expansion (HSE) steam engine with cylinders of 47.625 in (1,209.7 mm) in diameter with a 22 in (560 mm) stroke, rated at 400 nominal horsepower (NHP). She had a single 12 ft 6 in (3.81 m) diameter screw propeller. In 1864 she was re-engined with a 350 NHP 2-cylinder (55 in (1,400 mm) pistons on a 30 in (760 mm)stroke) supplied by Miller, Ravenhill & Salkeld.

Her planned armament in 1849 consisted of a single Monk’s 1839 56-pounder muzzle loading smooth bore (MLSB) of 87 hundredweight (cwt) 10-foot solid shot gun on a pivot mount, one 10-inch MLSB of 86 cwt 9-foot 4-inch shell gun on a pivot mount and four 8-inch 65 cwt MLSB 9-foot guns on broadside trucks plus two 32-pounder 25 cwt MLSB solid shot guns. In 1850 when commissioned, the armament was changed to fourteen 32 pounder 25 cwt 6-foot MLSB solid shot guns on broadside trucks. Later in 1856 a 68-pounder 95 cwt MLSB 10-foot solid shot gun was added on a pivot mount.

=== Trials ===
During her full power steam trials her engine generated 1,002 indicated horsepower (IHP) for a speed of 10.25 knots.

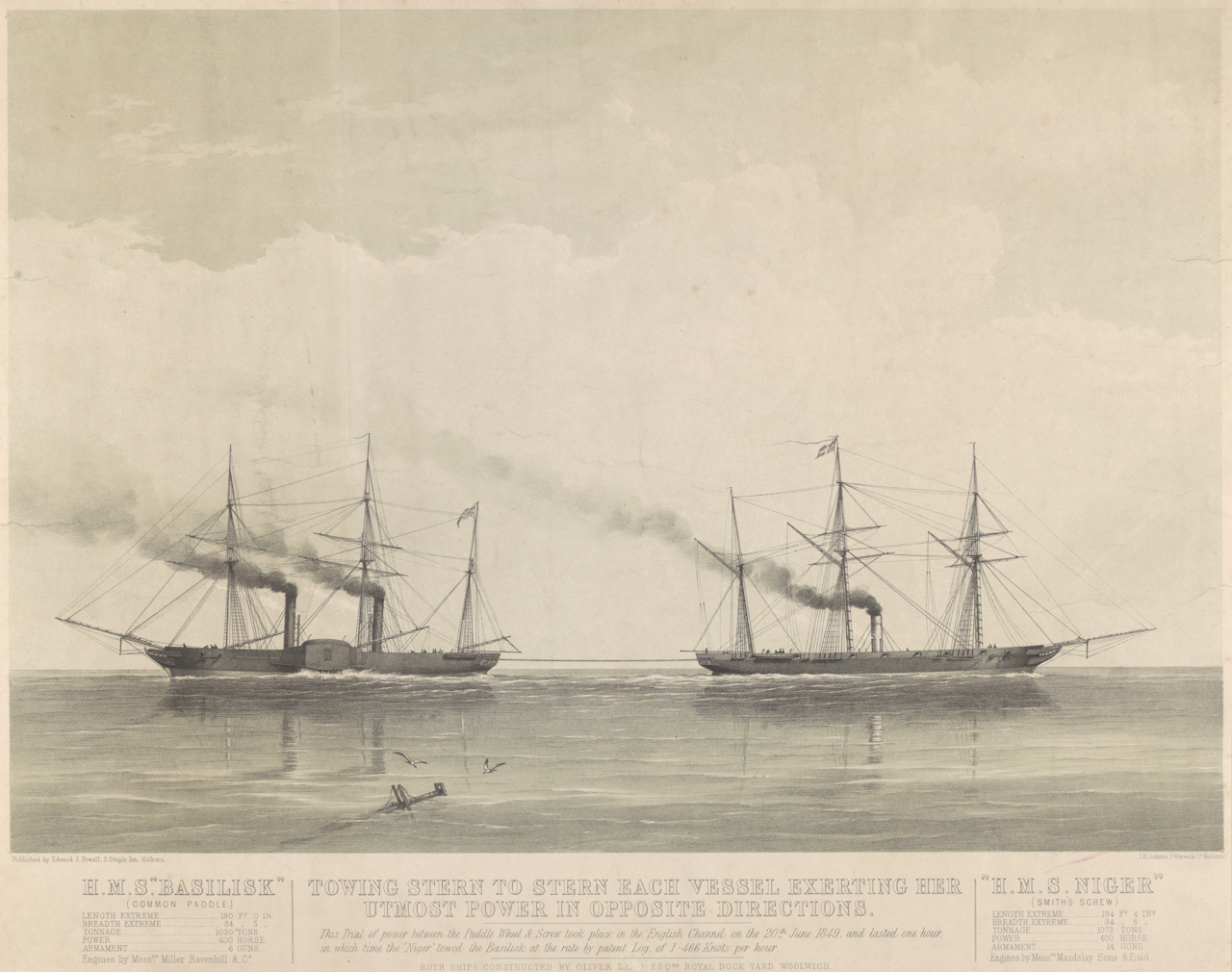
Basilisk, paddle sloop, towing stern-to-stern with Niger, screw sloop

She participated in 1849 in trials in the English Channel with the paddle sloop HMS Basilisk. Basilisk had started life as her sister ship when both were designed as sailing sloops, but while Niger received screw propulsion, Basilisk was fitted with paddles. Although previous trials, including a similar comparison between Rattler and Alecto in 1845, had shown that screw propulsion was broadly superior, the 1849 trials pitted two near-identical ships against each other. Since both ships had the same lines and steam engines developing almost identical power, the results confirmed the superiority of screw propulsion over the paddle-wheel once and for all.

""HMS Niger"" was completed for sea on the 16th of August 1850 at an initial cost of 57,597.

== First commission ==
She was commissioned at Portsmouth on the 9th of July 1850 under Commander Leopold G. Heath, RN for service on the West Coast of Africa. At the end of 1852 she was transferred to the Mediterranean, and in 1854 to the Black Sea for the Russian War. On 2 February 1855 Commander Henry W. Hire, RN took command. She paid off at Woolwich on 31 January 1856.

== Second commission ==
After a brief time in reserve, she was commissioned on 14 May 1856, under Captain Arthur A.L.P. Cochrane, RN for service in the East Indies Station and China Station. She was involved with the Second Anglo-Chinese War. When Captain Cochrane was invalided, Captain Peter Cracroft took command on the 8th of September 1858. In 1860 she transferred to the Australian Station and was involved in the New Zealand War 1860 – 61.

=== The First Taranaki War ===
On 28 March 1860, during the First Taranaki War, a party of approximately 60 marines and bluejackets under the command of Captain Peter Cracroft landed at Waireka as reinforcements in the engagement that was taking place there. After reaching the Omata stockade near dusk, they proceeded to storm the by now lightly defended Kaipopo Pā. Coxwain William Odgers broke through the palisades and pulled down the Māori ensigns flying there, and received the first Victoria Cross of the New Zealand wars as a result.

On 30 March 1860, HMS Niger shelled Māori positions near Warea. Her crew also participated during the storming of the Omata stockade. Later in 1860 the detachment of Marines was stationed as a garrison at Fort Niger, a hill overlooking the New Plymouth suburb of East End. The hill is a reserve today. She returned to Home Waters, paying off at Woolwich on 13 September 1861.

== Third commission ==
On 3 February 1865 she was commissioned under Captain John C. Byng, RN for service on the North America and West Indies Station. On 3 March 1865, HMS Niger ran aground in the River Thames at Greenhithe. She was refloated and taken in to Chatham for repairs. Captain James M. Bruce, RN took command on 9 October 1865 when Captain Byng was invalided. In late 1868 she returned to Home Waters.

== Disposition ==
Upon her arrival in Home Waters, she paid off at Woolwich on 9 December 1868. She was sold to Henry Castle & Sons for breaking at Charlton on 2 December 1869.
