= Rangatira =

Hereditary Māori leaders

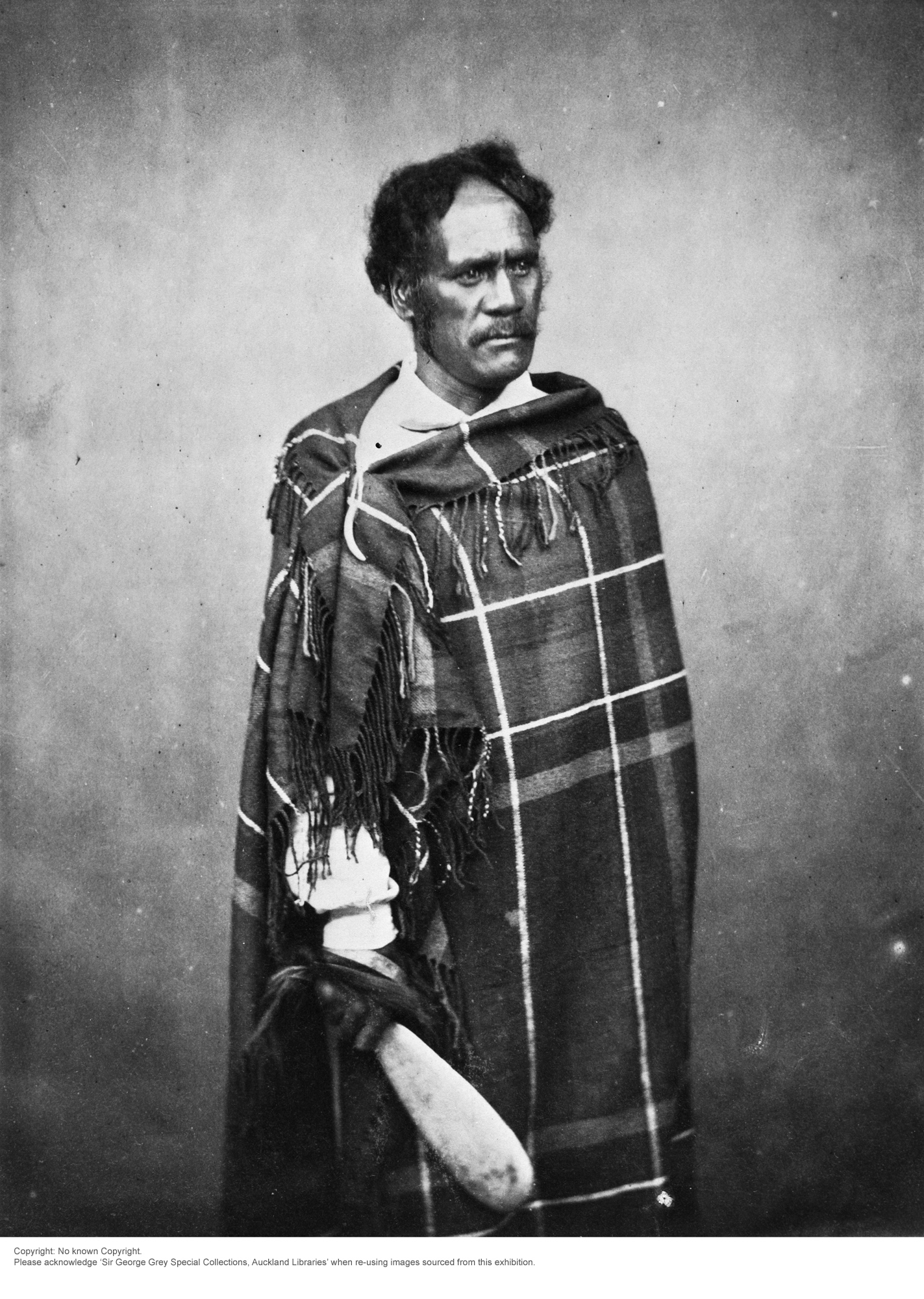
Īhāia Te Kirikūmara (died 1873), a 19th-century rangatira

In Māori culture, rangatira (Māori pronunciation: [ɾaŋatiɾa]) are tribal chiefs, the leaders (often hereditary) of a hapū (subtribe or clan). Ideally, rangatira were people of great practical wisdom who held authority (mana) on behalf of the tribe and maintained boundaries between a tribe's land (Māori: rohe) and that of other tribes. Changes to land-ownership laws in the 19th century, particularly the individualisation of land title, undermined the power of rangatira, as did the widespread loss of land under the Euro-settler-oriented government of the Colony of New Zealand from 1841 onwards. The concepts of rangatira and rangatiratanga (chieftainship), however, remain strong, and a return to rangatiratanga and the uplifting of Māori by the rangatiratanga system has been widely advocated for since the Māori renaissance began c. 1970. Moana Jackson, Ranginui Walker and Tipene O'Regan figure among the most notable of these advocates.

The concept of a rangatira is central to rangatiratanga—a Māori system of governance, self-determination and sovereignty.

== Etymology ==
The word rangatira means "chief (male or female), wellborn, noble" and derives from Proto-Central Eastern Polynesian *langatila ("chief of secondary status"). Cognate words are found in Moriori, Tahitian (i.e. the raʻatira in the name Tāvini Huiraʻatira), Cook Islands Māori, Tuamotuan, Marquesan and Hawaiian.

== Interpretations ==
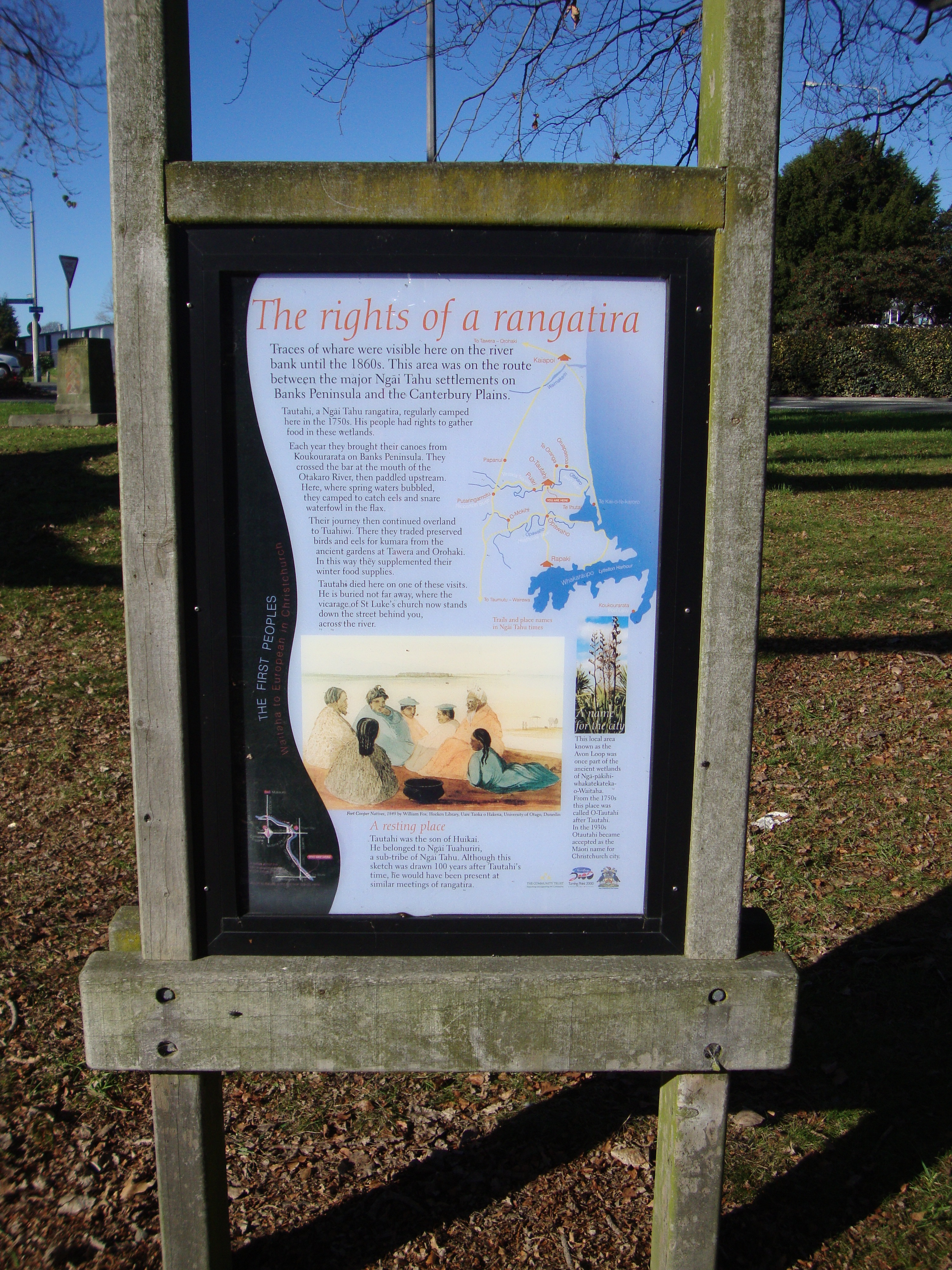
A sign explaining the tangata whenua history of The Bricks, Christchurch

Three interpretations of rangatira consider it as a compound of the Māori words "ranga" and "tira". In the first case, "ranga" is devised as a sandbar and the "tira" a shark fin. The allegoric sandbar helps reduce erosion of the dune (or people). The fin reflects both the appearance of the sandbar, and, more importantly, "its physical and intentional dominance as guardian". Rangatira reinforce communities, cease to exist without them ("for what is a sandbar without sand?"), and have a protective capacity.

Ethnographer John White (1826-1891) gave a different viewpoint in one of his lectures on Māori customs. He said Māori had traditionally formed two kahui who came together to discuss history or whakapapa.

"Each chief in the kahui had his place assigned to him, according to the amount of knowledge he possessed; and this place was given to him by the leader of the kahui of which he was a member. This act of the leader was called ranga, or putting in order. The people, as they came to the temple in a body, were called tira, or company; and as the leader had to assign, or ranga, a place to each of his tira, he was called the rangatira, from which we derive our word in Maori for chief, rangatira."

This interpretation fits well with a second translation where "ranga" is an abbreviation of rāranga (or weaving) and "tira" signifies a group.

A third interpretation fits equally well with this translation, interlinking concepts related to the identity of the ‘tira’. In the first instance, the conditional hospitality presented in the form of weaving created for the ‘tira’ of guests. In the second instance, the collective intentionality "enacted in the weaving" of the ‘tira’ of hosts. Together, these concepts highlight the value attached to the "personal relationship" between the leader and their group. This type of relationship is similar to the mahara atawhai (endearment or "benevolent concern") offered in the Treaty of Waitangi’s preamble by Queen Victoria, reflecting the pre-nineteenth century "personal bond between the ruler and subject".
