= Thomas Simson Pratt =

British Army general

General Sir Thomas Simson Pratt KCB
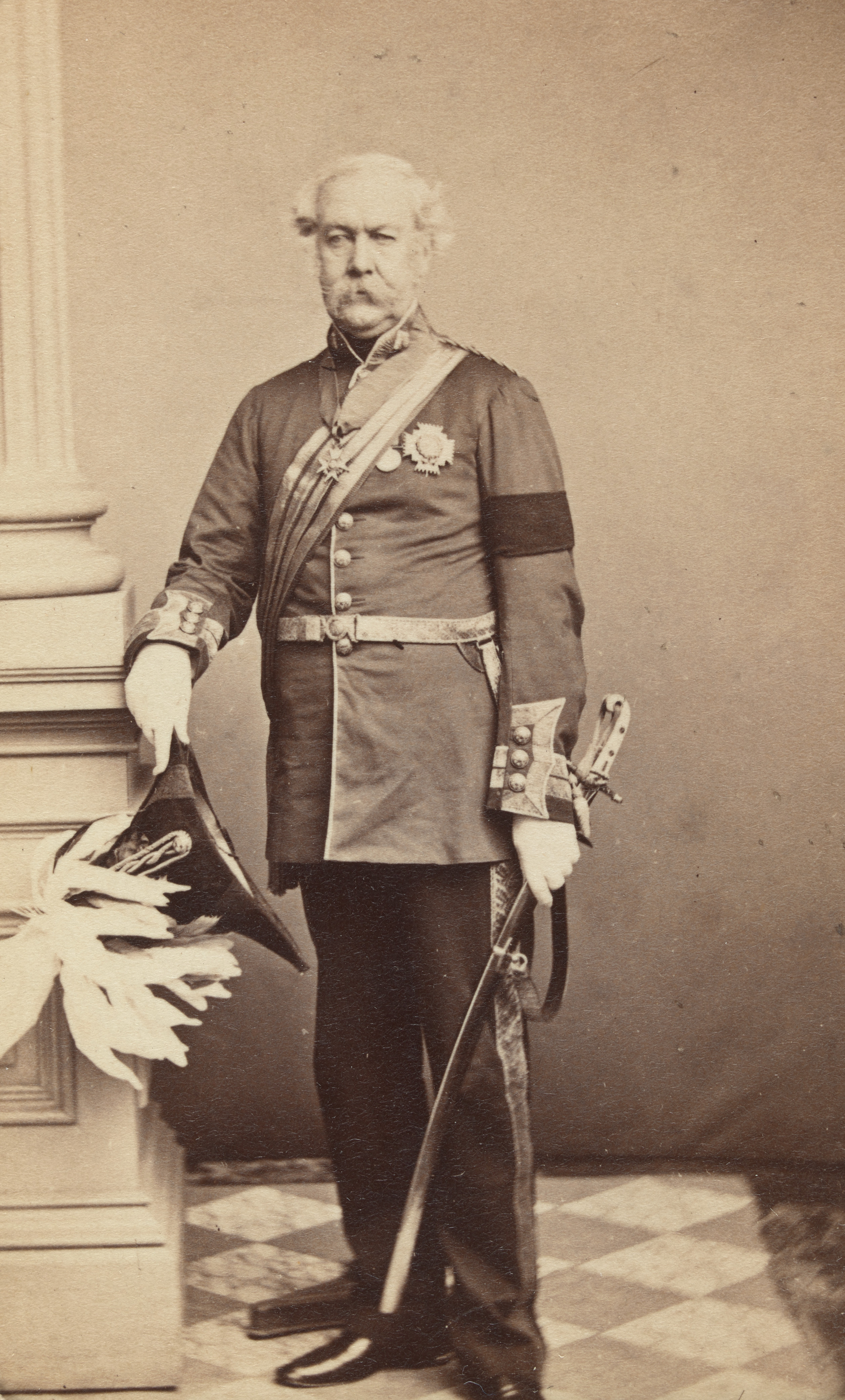
- Pratt as a major-general, c. 1864
- Born: Thomas Simson Pratt; 1797; Kingdom of Ireland
- Died: 2 February 1879 (aged 82); Bath, Somerset, England
- Burial place: Bath Abbey Churchyard
- Military career
- Allegiance: United Kingdom
- Branch: British Army
- Service years: 1814–1879
- Rank: General
- Conflicts: Napoleonic Wars; Siege of Antwerp; First Anglo-Chinese War; Battle of Chuenpi; Battle of the Bogue; Battle of Canton; Battle of Ningpo; Battle of Chapu; Battle of Woosung; Battle of Chinkiang; First Taranaki War; Battle of Puketakauere; Pratt's sapping campaign
- Awards: China War Medal (1842); New Zealand War Medal; Knight Commander of the Most Honourable Order of the Bath

General Sir Thomas Simson Pratt, KCB (19 July 1797 – 2 February 1879) was a British Army officer. He served in the First Anglo-Chinese War (1839–1841), in India from 1843 to 1855 where he was deputy adjutant-general at Madras, and was commander of the British Forces in Australia from 1856 to 1861. He was promoted to lieutenant-general on 31 May 1865, and to full general eight years later.

He was commander of the British Forces in New Zealand from 1860 to 1861, and was on the Executive Council. He commanded during the First Taranaki War, but as he realised the doubtful validity of the Waitara Purchase (the main cause of the war), he disagreed with Governor Gore Browne, and his military action was ridiculed by the local settlers. He was created KCB for his services in New Zealand by the British Government.

== Biography ==
Pratt, was born on 19 July 1797, in Ireland, where his father, Captain James Pratt was stationed with the Loyal Tay Fencibles. His mother Anne, was the daughter of Thomas Simson, late portioner in Wilkieston, County of Fife. He was educated at St. Andrews University. He was gazetted to an ensigncy in the 26th (Cameronian) Regiment of Foot on 2 February 1814, and served in Holland in the same year as a volunteer with the 56th (West Essex) Regiment of Foot.

He was present at the attack on Merksem on 2 February and the subsequent bombardment of Antwerp in 1814. He purchased his captaincy on 17 September 1825 and was with the 26th foot in the First Anglo-Chinese War. He commanded the land forces in the Second Battle of Chuenpi on 7 January 1841 and at the Battle of the Bogue on 26 February. In the attacks on Canton from 24 May to 1 June, he was in command of his regiment, and was present also at the demonstration before Nanking, and at the signing of the Treaty of Nanking on board HMS Cornwallis. On 28 August 1841, he was gazetted lieutenant-colonel, and from 5 September 1843 to 23 October 1855 was deputy adjutant-general at Madras. He was made a Companion of the Order of the Bath (CB) on 14 October 1841.

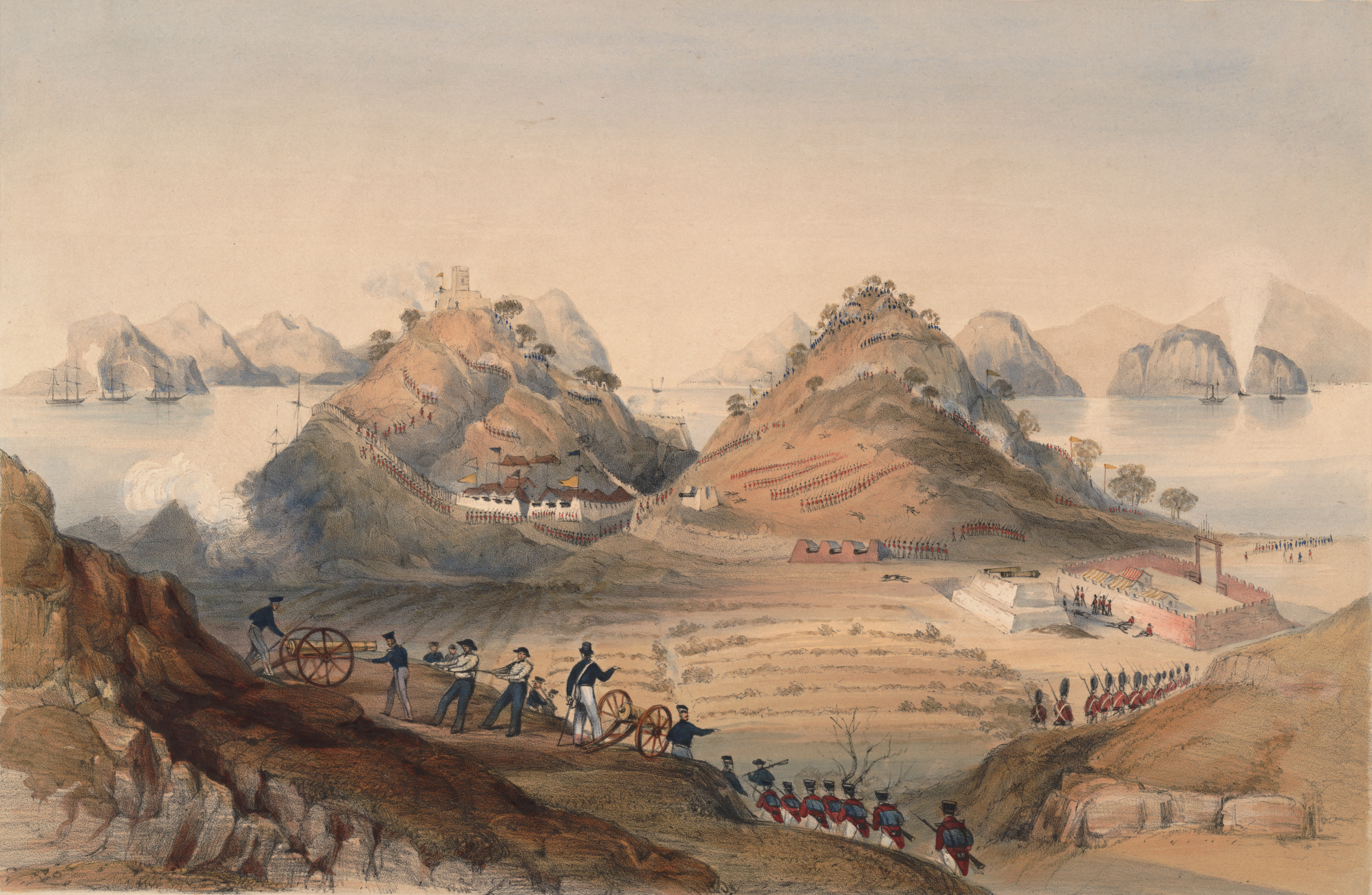
The storming of Chuenpi, 7 January 1841

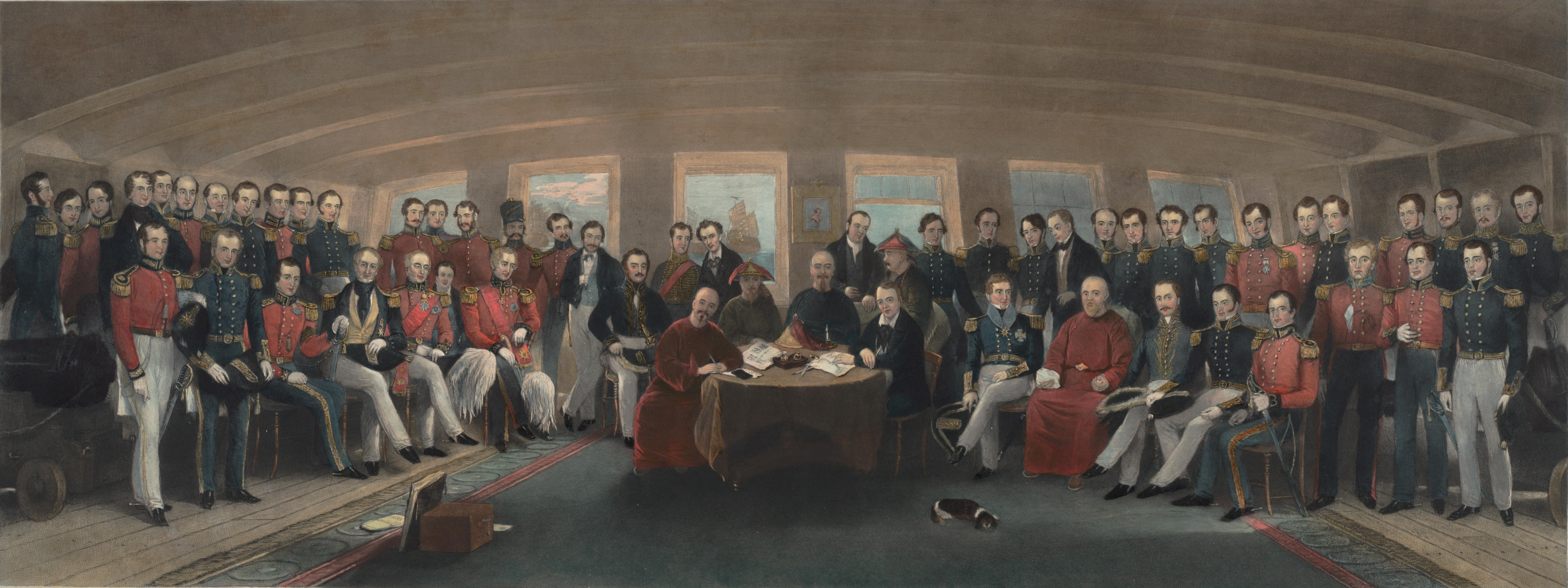
Signing and sealing of the Treaty of Nanking

From 1856 to 1861, he was in command of the forces in Australasia, based in Melbourne, with the rank of major-general. During 1860–61, he was in New Zealand, conducting the war against the Maori. On his return to Australia he commanded the forces in Victoria until May 1862, and was then appointed to the colonelcy of the 37th (North Hampshire) Regiment of Foot, which he held until his death. He was promoted to Knight Commander of the Most Honourable Order of the Bath (KCB) on 16 July 1861, being publicly invested with the ribbon and badge by Sir Henry Barkly, governor of Victoria, on 15 April 1862, which was the first ceremony of the kind performed in Australia. He was advanced to the rank of general on 26 May 1873.

He died at Bath, Somerset, England, on 2 February 1879 after suffering a stroke during the birthday party of a fellow army general, Sam Campbell. He had married Frances Agnes in 1827, second daughter of John S. Cooper. They had seven sons, James Lisson, Thomas Arthur Cooper, Francis Edward, Robert Torrens, Sisson Cooper, Chalmers and William Simson, and a daughter, Anne Maria, who became a botanist in 1860 and she married Sir Henry Barkly, then Governor of Victoria, Australia.

== Sources ==
- Biography in the 1966 Encyclopaedia of New Zealand
- Dictionary of New Zealand Biography, Volume 1, 1990
- Australian Dictionary of Biography, Volume 5, 1974

Attribution

This article incorporates text from a publication now in the public domain: "Pratt, Thomas Simson". Dictionary of National Biography. London: Smith, Elder & Co. 1885–1900.
