= Te Kehu =

Māori woman

Te Kehu, also known as Te Whetu-o-te-ao, was a Māori woman of the Te Āti Awa iwi (tribe) of New Zealand.

Te Kehu was married to Rere-tā-whangawhanga, with whom she had at least three sons, Wiremu Kīngi Te Rangitāke, Matiu and Enoka.

Te Kehu signed the Treaty of Waitangi on 19 May 1840 in Ōtaki, and was one of only a few women to sign the document. Her husband Rere-tā-whangawhanga also signed, but in Waikanae.
