= Wiremu Kīngi Te Rangitāke =

Māori tribal leader

- Born: Te Rangitāke
- Died: 13 January 1882; Kaingaru near Waitara
- Occupations: Chief of the Te Āti Awa iwi and warrior

Wiremu Kīngi Te Rangitāke (c. 1790s – 13 January 1882) was a Māori chief of the Te Āti Awa iwi (tribe) and leader of the Māori forces in the First Taranaki War.

Te Rangitāke was born probably in the final years of the 18th century at Manukorihi pa, near Waitara. He was the son of the chief Te Rere-tā-whangawhanga and his wife Te Kehu and had three younger brothers. He took the name Wiremu Kīngi when he was baptised a Christian in the early 1840s.

He and his father were involved in the major disturbances and migrations caused by the Musket Wars. They probably fought alongside Te Rauparaha during Ngāti Toa's migration from Kāwhia to the Kapiti coast in 1822. The Te Āti Awa returned to Taranaki in about 1823. Te Rere-tā-whangawhanga and others led the tribe south in the Heke Niho-puta migration in about 1824 to settle in Waikanae. He and Te Rangitāke participated in Te Āti Awa expeditions with Ngāti Toa and Ngāti Raukawa in the North Island and the South Island. Te Rere-tā-whangawhanga was, for example, on the expedition against Ngāi Tahu in the 1831–32 summer.

In 1839, Colonel William Wakefield persuaded the chiefs to sign deeds that transferred ownership of most of the Te Āti Awa tribal land to the New Zealand Company. The transaction was to cause a great deal of trouble and eventually was a factor that led to war.

Te Āti Awa initially accepted the changes brought about by the arrival of Pākehā (European settlers) and their new government. In May 1840 their chiefs signed the Treaty of Waitangi and in 1843–1844 they built a large church for the missionaries. On 31 January 1842 the whole of Northern Taranaki from Cape Egmont northwards to the Tongaporutu River was purchased by the Crown from Te Wherowhero, who later became the first Maori king, and his brother Kati for 150 pounds, 2 horses, 2 saddles, 2 bridles and 100 blankets. The sale included all the land around Waitara that was under the mana of Te Wherowhero. The deed was printed in both English and Maori. However, disenchantment began when the Land Commissioner, William Spain, awarded the New Plymouth settlers 200 km^{2} of tribal land around New Plymouth. Wiremu Kīngi wrote to Governor Robert FitzRoy making it clear that they would not yield their tribal lands, particularly around Waitara. Their case was weakened in the minds of settlers because the bulk of the tribe were then living around Waikanae about 250 km to the south since 1822–23. However, despite opposition from the Government, they returned to Taranaki 25 years later, in 1848 and settled around Waitara. Grey recognised that Te Atiawa's Wiremu Kīngi had been a valued ally in the 1846 war in Wellington where he had sided with the government forces. Grey was reluctant to take action against someone who had shown his loyalty to the Crown.

Over the next 11 years the government and settlers made numerous attempts to acquire more of the tribal land, but were restricted to about 20 km^{2} around New Plymouth. Wiremu Kīngi remained firm in his refusal to part with any of the tribal land. Gradually relations between the two peoples deteriorated. However, despite his concern with retaining land Kīngi did not support the largely Waikato-centred King movement.

In 1859 a minor tribal chief, Teira, who was feuding with Kīngi, made an offer of some land directly to Governor Thomas Gore Browne. The government accepted the offer despite warnings from many influential missionaries such as Octavius Hadfield and a previous Chief Justice, William Martin, that the purchase was illegal.

The stakes grew as Kīngi refused to budge. Prominent settlers called for him to be surrounded, deported and, if he fired one shot, hanged. The Government pressed ahead and sent in surveyors, declaring that once the survey was complete, the land would be occupied by the military to prevent any Māori occupation. They were blocked by the Te Atiawa people, so the army was sent in. The first shots of the First Taranaki War were fired on 17 March 1860. The war lasted a year and decided nothing except that the Māori were better tacticians than the Pākehā. There followed an uneasy truce when the government agreed to re-examine the question and, three years later, Governor George Grey renounced the purchase.

After the war Kīngi withdrew inland beyond the areas influenced by the Pākehā with the people of Ngati Maru at Manutangihia, in the upper reaches of the Waitara River. In 1863 Kīngi went to the Waikato to take part in this campaign. He was at Rangiriri Pa after the defeat at Meremere by General Cameron. Like many of the leaders he found a reason to leave Rangiriri as the British army, supported by militia and kupapa (loyal) Maori closed in. When the British gunboats appeared Wiremu Kīngi left After 12 years he returned to New Plymouth to make his peace with the Pākehā government and later retired to Parihaka where he lived with the prophet Te Whiti o Rongomai for several years. His last years were spent at Kaingaru near Waitara where he died on 13 January 1882.

In 2004, the New Plymouth District Council resolved to sell 146 ha of land at Waitara to the Crown on condition that it was used in settlement of Te Atiawa claims under the Treaty of Waitangi. Leaseholders mounted unsuccessful legal opposition in 2008 and 2011.

His great-grandson was Jack McLeod who played nine matches for the New Zealand rugby league team and represented Taranaki, Auckland, Auckland Māori and New Zealand Māori. McLeod's mother was Ada Rahunga McLeod (née Peters), who was Kingi's granddaughter from his second wife (Haupani Mere Peters).
