= First Taranaki War =

1860s war between Māori and the New Zealand government

- Part of the New Zealand Wars
Date	17 March 1860 – 18 March 1861
Location	Taranaki, New Zealand
Result	Inconclusive

Belligerents
(United Kingdom of Great Britain and Ireland) Colony of New Zealand	Taranaki Māori; Kīngitanga

Commanders and leaders
(United Kingdom of Great Britain and Ireland) Charles Gold (United Kingdom of Great Britain and Ireland) Thomas Pratt	Wiremu Kīngi; Hapurona; Epiha Tokohihi

Strength
3,500	1,600

Casualties and losses
238 killed or wounded	200 killed or wounded

The First Taranaki War (also known as the North Taranaki War) was an armed conflict over land ownership and sovereignty that took place between Māori and the Colony of New Zealand in the Taranaki region of New Zealand's North Island from March 1860 to March 1861.

The war was sparked by a dispute between the colonial government and the Te Āti Awa people, led by Wiremu Kīngi Te Rangitāke, over the disputed sale of the Pekapeka land block at Waitara. The deal was orchestrated by minor Te Āti Awa rangatira Te Teira Manuka. Initially a conflict over individual title and collective land ownership, all-out war broke out and soon spread throughout the region. It was fought by more than 3,500 imperial troops brought in from Australia, as well as volunteer soldiers and militia, against Māori forces that fluctuated between a few hundred and about 1,500. Total losses among the imperial, volunteer and militia troops are estimated to have been 238, while Māori casualties totalled about 200, although the proportion of Māori casualties was higher.

The war ended in a ceasefire, with neither side explicitly accepting the peace terms of the other. Although there were claims by the British that they had won the war, there were widely held views at the time they had suffered an unfavourable and humiliating result. Historians have also been divided on the result. Historian James Belich has claimed that the Māori succeeded in thwarting the British bid to impose sovereignty over them, and had therefore been victorious. But he said the Māori victory was a hollow one, leading to the invasion of the Waikato.

In its 1996 report to the Government on Taranaki land claims, the Waitangi Tribunal observed that the war was begun by the Government, which had been the aggressor and unlawful in its actions in launching an attack by its armed forces. An opinion sought by the tribunal from a senior constitutional lawyer stated that the Governor, Thomas Gore Browne, and certain officers were liable for criminal and civil charges for their actions. Historian William Oliver has criticised this report claiming the tribunal ignores the constraints and political realities faced by the Crown while simultaneously taking into account the surrounding circumstances when judging the actions of the Taranaki Maori. The term "First Taranaki War" is opposed by some historians, who refer only to the Taranaki Wars, rejecting suggestions that the post-1861 conflict was a second war. The 1927 Royal Commission on Confiscated Land also referred to the hostilities between 1864 and 1866 as a continuation of the initial Taranaki war.

== Background ==
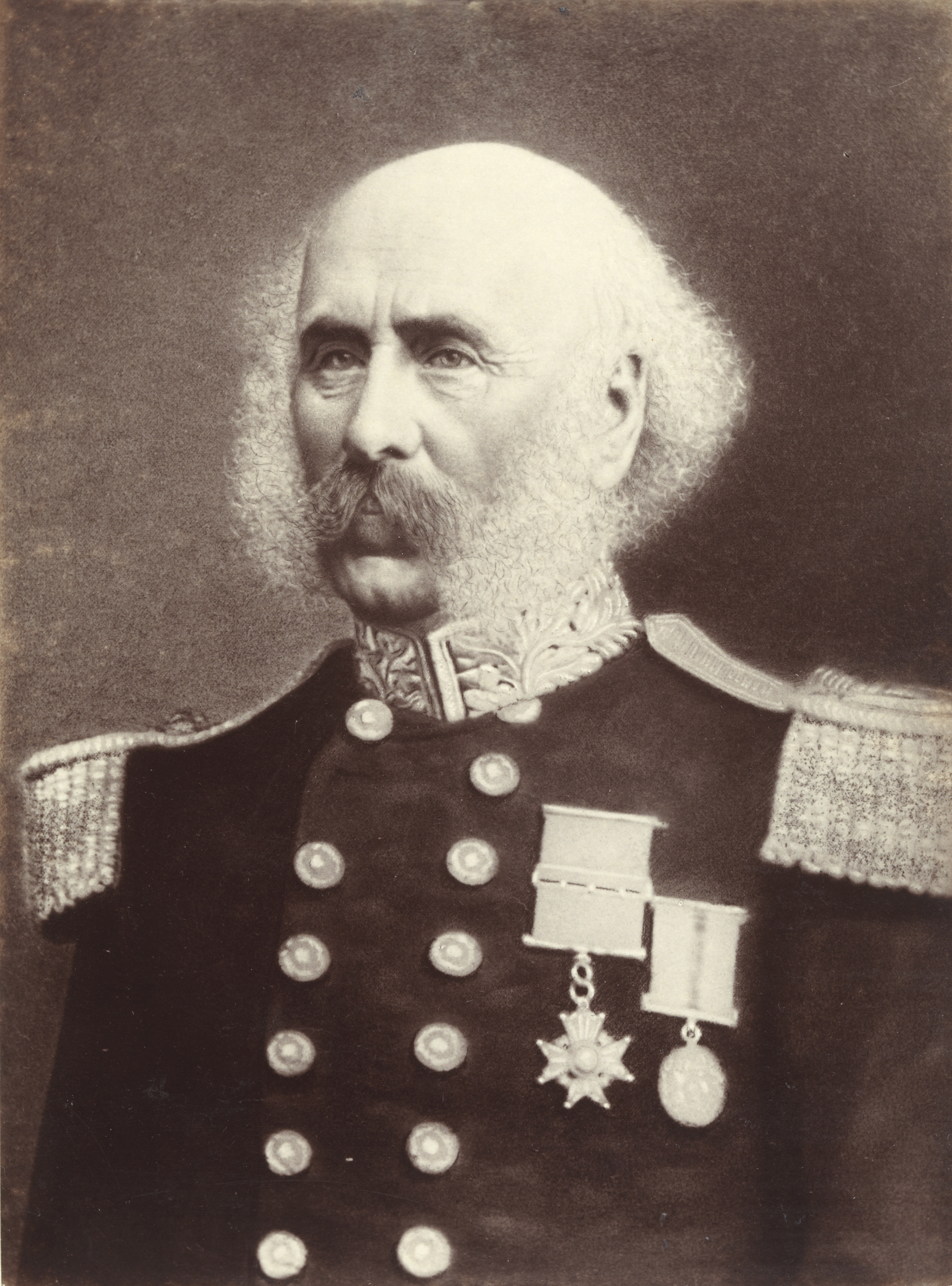
Governor Thomas Gore Browne.

The catalyst for the war was the disputed sale of 600 acres (2.4 km^{2}) of land known as the Pekapeka block, or Teira's block, at Waitara. The block's location perfectly suited European settlers' wish for a township and port to serve the north of the Taranaki district and its sale was viewed as a likely precedent for other sales that would open up for settlement all land between New Plymouth and the Waitara River. Pokikake Te Teira Manuka, a minor chief of the Te Atiawa iwi, first offered the land to the New Zealand government in 1857, immediately attracting vehement opposition from the paramount chief of the tribe, Wiremu Kīngi, who declared a veto on the plan. Kingi initially claimed that the land was collectively owned and therefore Teira did not have the right to sell the land, but later admitted Teira and his family were the sole owners of the land and that he simply didn't want the land to be disturbed. Teira's sale was, however, supported by Ihaia Kirikumara and his brother Tamati, who wrote letters to newspapers claiming that European occupation would allow returned slaves to live in security and lessen the chance that Waikato war parties would return.

Governor Browne felt obliged to resist the veto; he insisted Māori had the right to sell if they wished, and wanted to demonstrate support for a friendly chief over an individual who was resisting the Crown's authority and the expansion of European law. Browne accepted the purchase with full knowledge of the circumstances and tried to occupy the land, anticipating it would lead to armed conflict. A year earlier Browne had written to the Colonial Office in England, advising: "I have, however, little fear that William King (Kingi) will venture to resort to violence to maintain his assumed right, but I have made every preparation to enforce obedience should he presume to do so."

Although the pressure for the sale of the block resulted from the colonists' hunger for land in Taranaki, the greater issue fueling the conflict was the Government's desire to impose British administration, law and civilisation on Māori as a demonstration of the substantive sovereignty the British believed they had gained in the 1840 Treaty of Waitangi. The hastily written Māori translation, however, had given Māori chiefs an opposing view that the English had gained only nominal sovereignty, or "governorship" of the country as a whole while Māori retained "chieftainship" over their lands, villages and treasures.

By 1860, it was tacitly recognised that British law prevailed in the settlements and Māori custom elsewhere, though the British, who by then outnumbered Māori, were finding this increasingly irksome. One commentator observed, concerning Waitara: "We seem to be fast approaching a settlement of that point, whether Her Fair Majesty or His Dark Majesty shall reign in New Zealand." The British were convinced that their system represented the best that civilization had to offer and saw it as their duty and right to impose it on other peoples.

However, in the 20 years since the signing of the Treaty, Māori had made significant political advances. They had moved from being a collection of independent tribes to an effective confederation known as the Māori King Movement, which was centred on the Waikato region, but which influenced large areas of the North Island. One of the uniting principles of the King Movement was their opposition to the sale of Māori land and the spread of British sovereignty.

The settlement of New Plymouth—at the time "a line of wooden houses straggling untidily along the waterfront and intersected by bush-filled gullies which provided perfect cover for an attacking party"—was deemed vulnerable to assault by hostile Māori because of tensions over land sales and a detachment of British troops had been placed in the settlement in 1855. The killing of Katatore, an opponent of land selling at Waitara, in January 1858—which in turn sparked more feuding among local Māori and threats of a revenge massacre at Waitara by Kingi—prompted the formation of the Taranaki Militia in 1858 and Taranaki Volunteer Rifle Company in 1859.

== Battle at Te Kohia ==
Teira was paid a £100 deposit for the land in December 1859. When Māori obstructed surveyors as they began work on the block, Browne responded by declaring martial law throughout Taranaki on 22 February 1860. Two days later a deed for the sale of the disputed Pekapeka block was executed, with 20 Māori signatories of Te Teira's family accepted as representing all owners of the land.

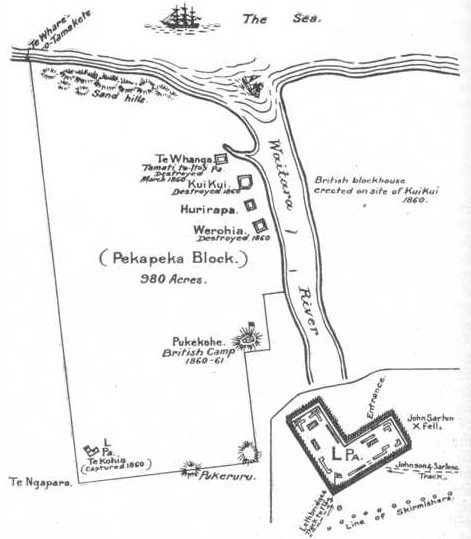
Location of the disputed Pekapeka block on the site of modern-day Waitara.

On 4 March, Browne ordered Colonel Charles Emilius Gold, commanding the 65th Regiment, the Taranaki Militia and the Taranaki Rifle Volunteers, to occupy the disputed block of land at Waitara in preparation for a survey. Four hundred men landed at Waitara the next day to fortify a position and the survey of the land began on 13 March without resistance.

On the night of 15 March, however, Kingi and about 80 men built an L-shaped pā, or defensive strong point, at Te Kohia, at the south-west extremity of the block, commanding the road access. The next day, they uprooted the surveyors' boundary markers and when ordered the following day, 17 March, to surrender, they refused. Gold's troops opened fire and the Taranaki wars had begun.

Gold's troops, by then numbering almost 500, poured in heavy fire all day from as near as 50 metres, firing 200 rounds from two 24-pound howitzers as well as small arms fire. Despite the firepower, the Māori suffered no casualties and abandoned the pā that night. Though it was small—about 650 square yards—the pā had been situated so that it was difficult to surround and had also been built with covered trenches and 10 anti-artillery bunkers, roofed with timber and earth, that protected its garrison.

The British objective at Waitara had been a rapid and decisive victory that would destroy the main enemy warrior force, checking and crippling Māori independence and asserting British sovereignty. That mission failed and the Te Kohia clash ended as little more than a minor skirmish with a result that disappointed English settlers.

Yet for Māori, too, the engagement had strong symbolic importance. Outnumbered and outgunned, Kingi needed to draw allies from several places, but by Māori tikanga, or protocol, support would not be offered to an aggressor. Te Kohia pa, hastily built and just as quickly abandoned, appeared to have been built for one purpose: to provide plain evidence of the Governor's "wrong". The aggressor having been identified, others were then free to launch reprisals under utu laws.

Within days, Māori war parties began plundering the farms south of New Plymouth, killing six settlers who had not taken refuge in the town. Fearing an attack on New Plymouth was imminent, the British withdrew from Waitara and concentrated around the town.

== Battle of Waireka ==
Troops defend Jury's farmhouse in the Battle of Waireka, by A. H. Messenger.

The military action at Waitara brought the result Kingi had been hoping for and within 10 days of the Te Kohia battle, about 500 warriors from the Taranaki, Ngati Ruanui and Ngā Rauru iwi converged on the New Plymouth area to provide support. The warriors built an entrenched and stockaded pā named Kaipopo on one of the hills at Waireka, about 8 km southwest of New Plymouth and 4 km from the Omata stockade that lay on the road to the town. The area was scattered with some houses built by European settlers, and on 27 March, five settlers, including two boys, were either shot or tomahawked in the Omata district.

Tensions in New Plymouth quickly climbed and settlers with large families were ordered, under martial law, to evacuate to the safety of the town. Among those who remained in the Omata area were the Rev. Henry Brown, the Rev. Thomas Gilbert and several others who were either French or Portuguese. All felt safe: both ministers were treated by Māori as tapu or untouchable, while the others were confident the Māori grievance was with only the British.

About 1 pm on 28 March, a British force of about 335 men—28 Navy, 88 from the British 65th Regiment, 103 members of the newly formed Taranaki Rifle Volunteers and 56 from a local militia—set off in two columns to ostensibly rescue those who had remained behind. It would be the first occasion on which a British Volunteer corps engaged an enemy on the battlefield.

Captain Charles Brown, in command of the settlers, was ordered to march down the coast until he reached the rear of the Māori positions at Waireka. The Regulars, under Lieut-Colonel George Freeman Murray, marched down the main road to Omata, intending to dislodge a war party reported to be at Whalers Gate, north of Omata. Once the road was clear, it was intended they would be joined by the Volunteers and militia, who would rescue the settlers, before marching back to New Plymouth. Because of the heightened state of fear in New Plymouth, however, Murray had been ordered to return his troops to the town before nightfall. The Volunteers were armed with muzzle-loading Enfield rifles and the militia had old smooth-bore muskets from the 1840s, with each man issued with just 30 rounds of ammunition.

Murray met no resistance at Whalers Gate, but as he approached Waireka he heard the sound of rapid firing towards the coast. He entrenched his men and opened fire on the Kaipopo pā with a rocket tube. The gunfire Murray heard was being exchanged between about 200 Māori warriors—who, armed mostly with double-barrel shotguns and some rifles, were firing from the cover of bush and flax in the river gully—and the militia and Volunteers, who had retreated to the safety of the farmhouse of settler John Jury. Most of the battle took place on the flat farm land below the pa.

About 5.30 pm, Murray sounded the bugle for a retreat, withdrawing his Regulars for the march back to New Plymouth so they could arrive before dark. His withdrawal left the settler force, which had already suffered two killed and eight wounded, isolated at the farmhouse with little ammunition and late in the night, carrying their casualties, they scrambled across paddocks to the Omata stockade, arriving about 12.30 am, before returning to New Plymouth.

Late in the afternoon, meanwhile, Captain Peter Cracroft, commander of HMS Niger, had landed 60 bluejackets at New Plymouth and marched via Omata to Waireka, encountering Murray as he prepared to retreat. Cracroft's troops fired 24-pound rockets into the pā from a distance of about 700 metres and stormed it at dusk, tearing down three Māori ensigns. The first man into the pā was leading seaman William Odgers, who was awarded a Victoria Cross for bravery–the first awarded in the New Zealand Wars. Cracroft's men then returned to New Plymouth, without making contact with the settler force, who were still at the Jury farmhouse. The storming of the pā was the second stage of the battle. Most or all or the Māori casualties—between 17 and 40—occurred during the first stage of fighting around the gully and Jury homestead, according to Cowan.

Cracroft was lauded as a hero, with claims of the number of Māori killed by his troops ranging from 70 to 150. Total European losses were 14 killed and wounded. Historian James Belich has claimed the pā was more of a camp and all but empty and the total Māori casualties amounted to no more than one. He described the "legend" of Waireka as a classic example of the construction of a paper victory, with invented claims of "enormous" losses and a great British victory.

The settlers, apparently overlooked in the fracas, watched the action from their house and the next day made their way to New Plymouth, where Gilbert said: "It was no wish of ours that an armed expedition should be set on foot on our behalf. We were perfectly safe."

Murray was widely condemned for his actions in withdrawing his troops and a court of inquiry was convened into his conduct.

== Battle of Puketakauere ==
On 20 April 1860 Browne ordered a suspension of hostilities against Taranaki Māori, fearing the intervention of the King Movement and a possible attack on Auckland. He knew he lacked the resources to defend Auckland if troops were engaged in Taranaki. Both Kingi and the Government made repeated diplomatic approaches to King Pōtatau Te Wherowhero seeking his allegiance, but by early May Pōtatau seemed to have decided to offer at least token support to Taranaki Māori, sending a Kingite war party to the district under the control of war chief Epiha Tokohihi. Kingi seized the opportunity to spark a confrontation with the imperial government to demonstrate the viability of resistance and draw stronger Kingite support.

Early in June, Atiawa war chief Hapurona began building Onukukaitara, a stockaded pā adjacent to the unfortified ancient pā known as Puketakauere. The two pā were sited on a pair of low hills 800m southeast of Te Kohia and 1.6 km south of the garrison known as Camp Waitara (site of the modern town of Waitara), which had been established to protect the survey of Waitara. The pā posed a military threat to the Waitara garrison and was seen as extreme provocation.

On 23 June, a British reconnaissance party approached the pā, in what may have been an attempt to bait the Māori, and was fired on. Colonel Gold immediately authorised an attack. Before dawn on 27 June, the British commander at Waitara, Major Thomas Nelson, marched out with 350 experienced troops and two 24-pound howitzers to storm the pā, which was defended by about 200 Atiawa.

The troops intended to encircle the two hills, cutting off a path of retreat for the Māori, before destroying Onukukaitara, above the flax-covered stockade of which flew a flag. The troops split into three divisions for the march. Nelson led the main body of almost 180 men and the two howitzers on an approach from the north, intending to bombard the stockade from the south-west. A second division of 125 men, led by Captain William Messenger, was given the more difficult task of approaching the area in darkness through a swampy gully and high fern and scrub to the east, taking possession of the apparently deserted Puketakauere, blocking the path of any possible reinforcements and supporting Nelson's efforts against the main target. His approach was made more challenging by the heavy mid-winter rain that had deepened the swamp. The remaining division, about 60 men under Captain Bowdler, was to take up a position on a mound between the pā and Camp Waitara, blocking an escape to the north.

About 7 am, Nelson's howitzers began pounding their target, but created only a small breach in the fort. His men then approached the pā across open ground, but came under heavy fire from Māori concealed just metres away in deep trenches in a small natural gully. The attack was described by some survivors as "hotter than anything in the great Indian battles or in the attack on the Redan in the Crimea". As they came under fire, Messenger's division found itself the target of other Māori who ambushed them from outlying trenches on the fern-covered slopes. Messenger's division became disordered and was split into groups. Many troops were tomahawked in the swamp or drowned as they fled to the flooded Waitara River. Most of the wounded were abandoned and many of those were hacked to death. A group of survivors with Messenger managed to join Nelson, who sounded the retreat, while others remained hiding in the swamp and fern and returned to camp later.

Puketakauere was both the most important and most disastrous battle of the First Taranaki War for the British, who suffered losses of 32 killed and 34 wounded, almost one in five of the force engaged. It was also one of the three most clear-cut defeats suffered by imperial troops in New Zealand. Despite claims at the time that the British killed between 130 and 150 of the enemy, Māori casualties were estimated to be just five, including two Maniapoto chiefs.

Colonel Gold came under heavy criticism for the defeat. He was accused of cowardice and stupidity and an attempt was made to persuade the senior militia officer to arrest him. He was subsequently replaced by Major-General Thomas Pratt.

The real reason for the Māori victory, however, was a combination of tactics and engineering techniques. Hapurona had enticed the British to fight at a place of his own choosing and then used the twin ploys of deception and concealment. He created a false target for the British artillery with the fortification of Onukukaitara which, despite its flag and flax-covered stockade, was essentially an empty pā. Māori defences were instead concentrated on the old, apparently unfortified pā, where deep trenches concealed the well-armed warriors until the British were almost at point-blank range. When the British were split into two groups at the two hills, Hapurona was also able to switch warriors from each focus of action, forcing the British to fight two battles while the Māori fought just one.

In the wake of the demoralising loss, the central portion of New Plymouth was entrenched and most women and children were evacuated to Nelson, out of fear the town would be attacked. The garrison was reinforced with almost 250 soldiers from the 40th Regiment, sent from Auckland, as well as additional artillery.

In July Browne convened a month-long conference of chiefs at Kohimarama, Auckland, ostensibly to discuss the Treaty of Waitangi, but with an aim to halt the conflict at Waitara. Browne opened the conference by explaining that the treaty guaranteed racial equality, but he also warned that violating allegiance to the Crown would negate the rights of British citizenship under the treaty. Among the resolutions adopted was one in which chiefs "are pledged to do nothing inconsistent with their declared recognition of the Queen's sovereignty, and the union of the two races," and that they would halt all actions that would tend to breach that covenant. Author Ranginui Walker noted: "The Maori were too trusting. There was no reciprocal promise extracted from the Governor to abide by the Treaty." Another resolution proposed by Maori "kingmaker" Wiremu Tamihana, which "deprecates in the strongest manner the murders of unarmed Europeans committed by the Natives now fighting at Taranaki", was also passed.

== Further clashes ==
From August to October 1860, there were numerous skirmishes close to New Plymouth, including one on 20 August involving an estimated 200 Māori, just 800 metres from the barracks on Marsland Hill. Many settlers' farms were burned and the village of Henui, 1.6 km from town, was also destroyed. Several farmers and settlers, including children, were killed by hostile Māori as they ventured beyond the town's entrenchments, including John Hurford (tomahawked at Mahoetahi on 3 August), Joseph Sarten (shot and tomahawked, Henui, 4 December), Captain William Cutfield King (shot, Woodleigh estate, 8 February 1861) and Edward Messenger (shot, Brooklands, 3 March). There were frequent skirmishes around Omata and Waireka, where extensive trenches and rifle pits were dug on the Waireka hills to threaten a British redoubt on the site of the Kaipopo pā.

With British forces in Taranaki boosted to about 2,000 by July, the British intensified efforts to crush resistance. Governor Browne was particularly worried that a general uprising would occur while the bulk of troops in the country were concentrated in Taranaki and he appealed to Britain and Australia for more reinforcements. Major Nelson, meanwhile, destroyed several Te Atiawa villages including Manukorihi, Tikorangi and Ratapihipihi, Pratt launched a major attack with 1,400 men near Waitara on 9 September, burning and looting four entrenched villages, and in October, he marched with a force of more than 1,000 to the Kaihihi River at Ōkato to conduct an operation with sapping and heavy artillery to destroy several more pā.

On 6 November, a party of between 50 and 150 Ngati Haua Kingites were routed in a surprise attack by 1,000 troops at the Battle of Mahoetahi.

There were some humiliating setbacks for the British, however, with 1,500 troops retreating from a small Māori force at Huirangi on 11 September and a force of 500 suffering casualties in an ambush while destroying a pā on 29 September.

Kingite warriors continued to travel between Taranaki and Waikato, providing a peak force of about 800 in January 1861, with weapons and ammunition being bought on the black market in Auckland, Waiuku and Kawhia, while in Taranaki posts at Omata, the Bell Block, Waireka and Tataraimaka were garrisoned – with each of those often surrounded by a cordon of pā.

== Pratt's sapping campaign ==
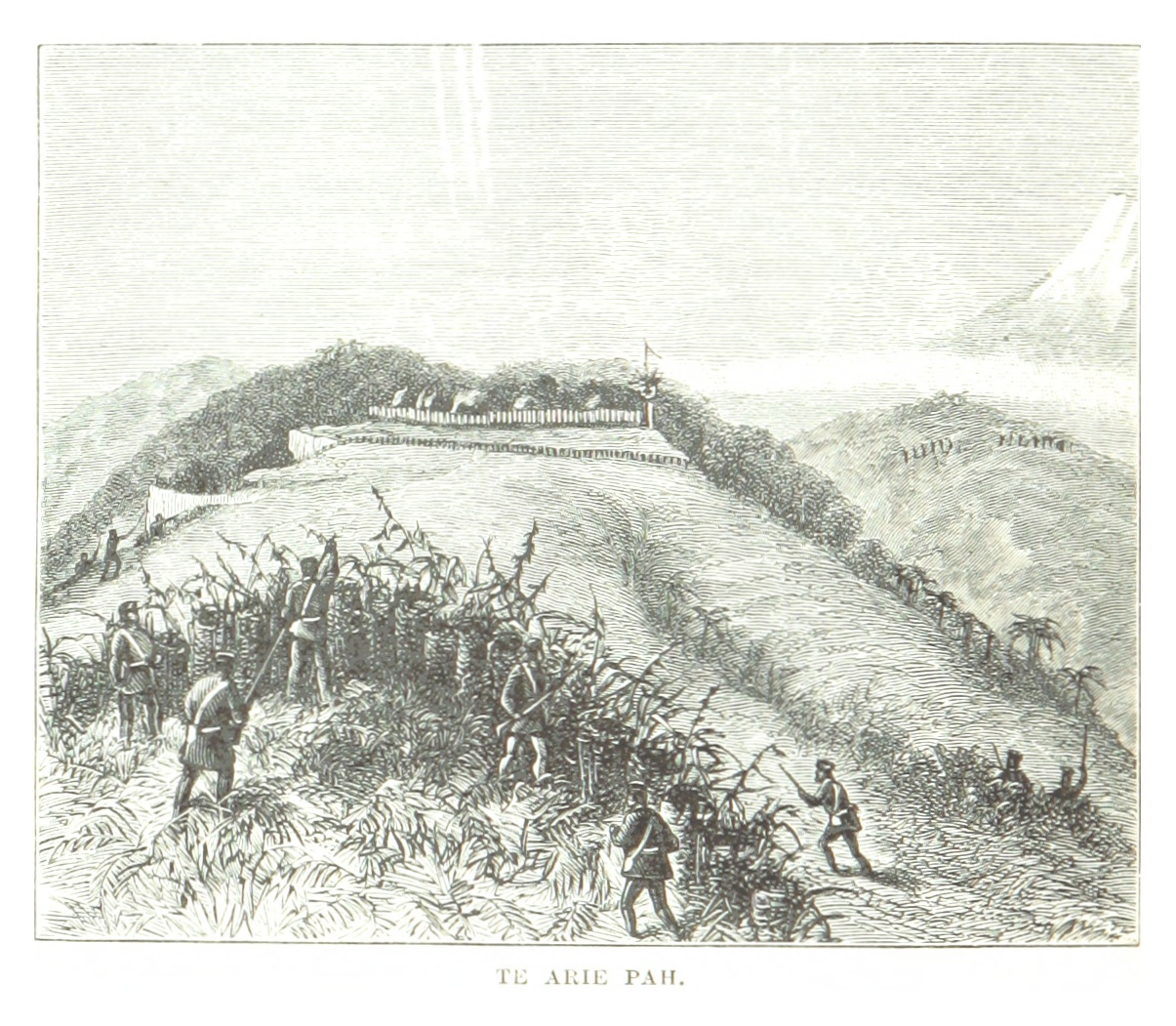
Te Arei Pā

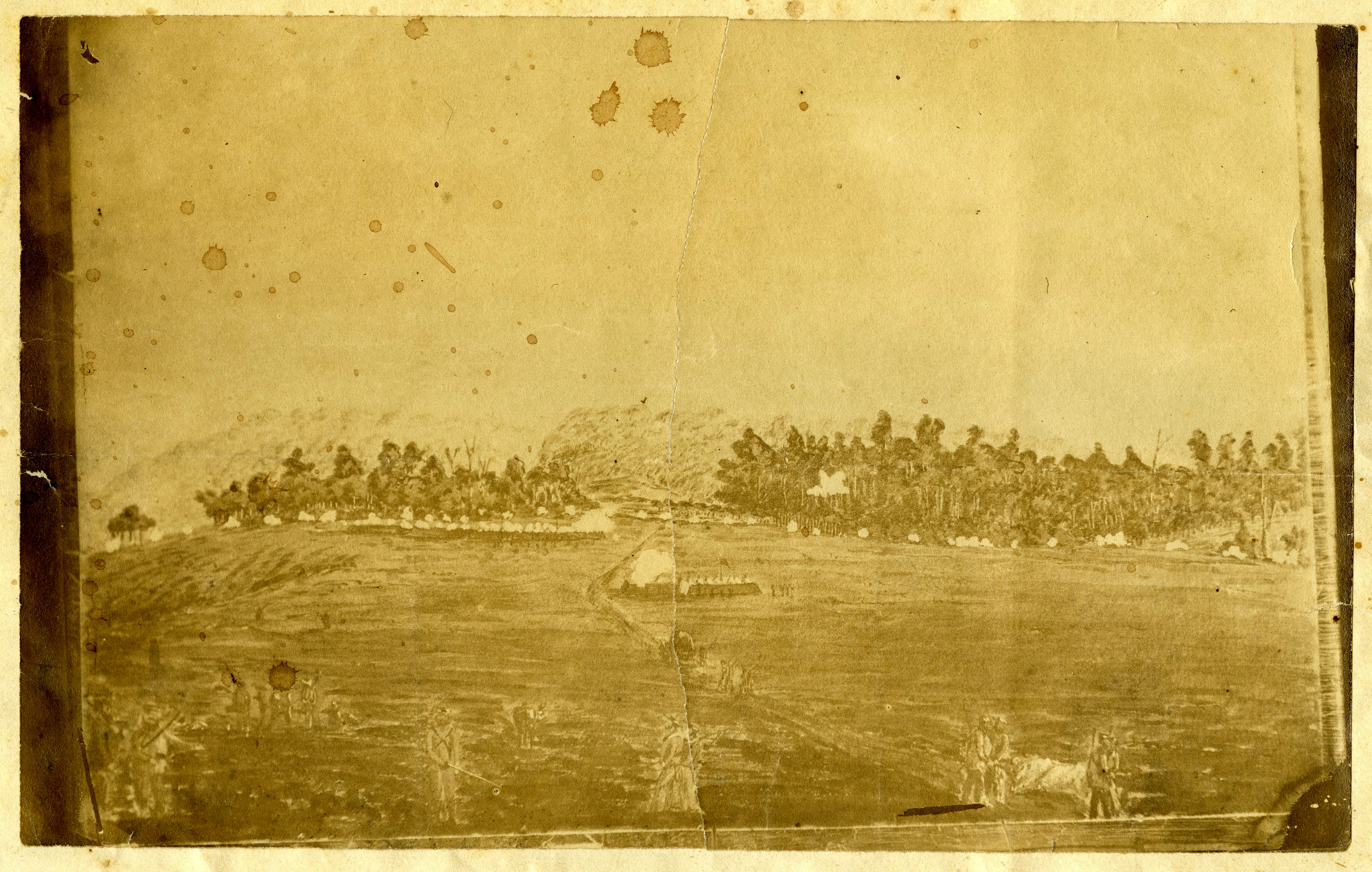
British positions in Huirangi (1861)

In December 1860, Major-General Pratt began operations against a major Māori defensive line called Te Arei ("The barrier") on the west side of the Waitara River, barring the way to the historic hill pā of Pukerangiora. The principal defences were Kairau and Huirangi, skillfully engineered lines of rifle-pits, trenches and covered walkways. Backed with heavy artillery and a force of 900 men, Pratt advanced from Waitara on 29 December towards the Matarikoriko pā, between Puketakauere and the Waitara River, before building a redoubt on the old Kairau pā under heavy day-long fire from bush-covered rifle pits 150m away. Both sides exchanged heavy fire the next day, with British troops expending 70,000 rounds of rifle ammunition and 120 rounds of shot and shell and suffering three deaths and 20 wounded. The pā was captured on 31 December after being abandoned, and a stockade and blockhouses built on the site for a garrison of 60.

A second redoubt, No.2, was built in 11 hours on 14 January 500m past the Kairau redoubt and garrisoned by 120 men with artillery. Four days later, Pratt and a force of 1,000 moved out another 400m to build Redoubt No.3, which was garrisoned with 300 men and made the headquarters of the 40th Regiment.

At 3.30 am on 23 January 1861, No.3 Redoubt was stormed by a force of 140 warriors of Ngati Haua, Ngati Maniapoto, Waikato and Te Atiawa, led by Rewi Maniopoto, Epiha Tokohihi and Hapurona. Fierce fighting at close quarters, involving rifles, bayonets, shotgun, hand grenades and tomahawks, took place over the newly built parapet and in the boundary trench and lasted until daylight when British reinforcements arrived from Redoubt No.1. British losses in the fight were five killed and 11 wounded. Māori losses were estimated at 50.

From 22 January, the day before the attack on No.3 Redoubt, Pratt began employing the Royal Engineers to systematically apply the technique of sapping to advance towards Te Arei. Excavating through night and day under frequent fire, Pratt's sap extended 768 yards and crossed the rifle pits of the Huirangi pā, prompting Māori to abandon the pā and fall back on Pukerangiora. Despite widespread criticism for his slow progress and caution, Pratt pressed on towards Te Arei, creating the most extensive field-engineering works ever undertaken by British troops in New Zealand. Five more redoubts were built as the saps continued to the edge of the cliff above the Waitara River, but ceased after the intervention of Kingite chief Wiremu Tamihana, who helped negotiate a truce. A ceasefire was formally effected on 18 March 1861, ending the first phase of the Taranaki War. For his actions on 18 March, Colour-Sergeant John Lucas was awarded the Victoria Cross.

By early 1861, settler opinion was evenly divided on Browne's stance against Māori and the fairness of the Waitara purchase. Many believed the British had little hope of wearing the enemy down with further military campaigns. Even Pratt expressed doubts the war could be won. The district had also suffered great economic hardship, with immigration all but coming to a stop and the destruction of three-quarters of farmhouses at Omata, Bell Block, Tataraimaka, and settlements nearer the town.

== Casualties ==
237 British soldiers were killed or wounded during the war, and 120 people had died due to disease in New Plymouth, due to the cramped conditions. Māori casualties were often exaggerated by colonial authorities, however at least 99 Māori died or were injured during the campaign, with most losses coming from Waikato Tainui (predominantly Ngāti Maniapoto, Ngāti Hauā and Ngāti Mahuta). Ngāti Ruanui chief Te Rei Hanataua of the Tangahoe hapū, who was killed during the Battle of Waireka.

== Historical site preservation ==
In June 2016 the New Plymouth District Council announced it had paid $715,000 to a private seller for Te Kohia Pa near Waitara. The council said it would work with Te Atiawa governance entity Te Kotahitanga o Te Atiawa on a development plan for the site that could include memorials, heritage and cultural tourism and educational developments. Mayor Andrew Judd said the site was regarded as an extension of the Puke Ariki museum. The pa's exact location on the Devon Road site will be determined by archaeological investigations once a house on the land has been relocated. Although plans continue to be discussed the site remains undeveloped.

== See also ==
- Beauchamp Seymour, Commander of the Naval Brigade
- Donald McLean, Land Purchase Commissioner
- History of New Plymouth
- Invasion of the Waikato
- New Zealand wars
- Second Taranaki War
- Thomas Simson Pratt, British General
- Waitara, New Zealand
