= Īhāia Te Kirikūmara =

Notable Māori tribal leader

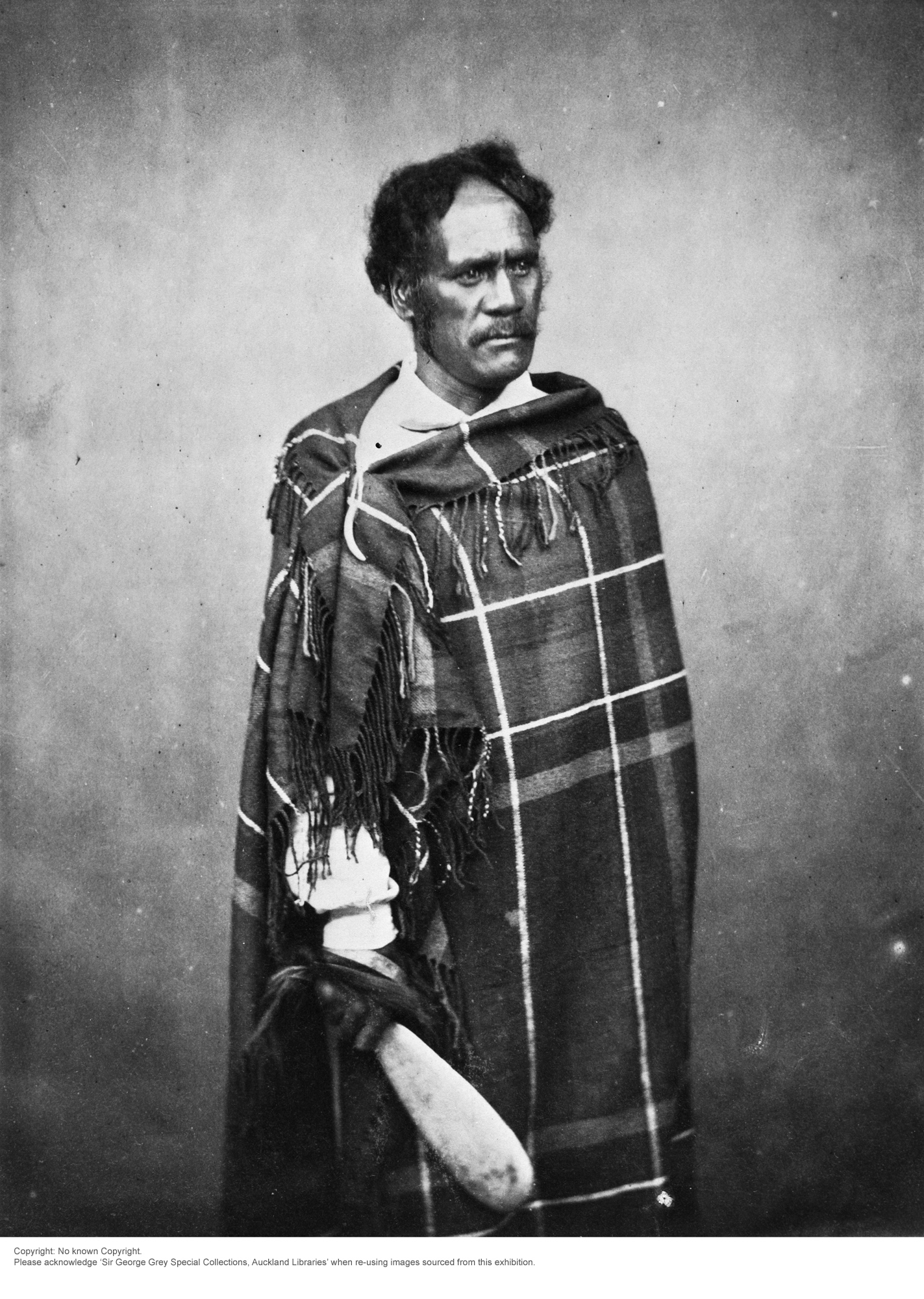
Īhāia Te Kirikūmara. Otaraua, Te Āti Awa. from Sir George Grey Special Collections, Auckland Libraries

Īhāia Te Kirikūmara (died 1873) was a notable Māori tribal leader. He was chief of the Ōtaraua hapū of the Te Āti Awa iwi. He was born in Taranaki, New Zealand.
