= Rainbows End, New Zealand =

Rainbows End
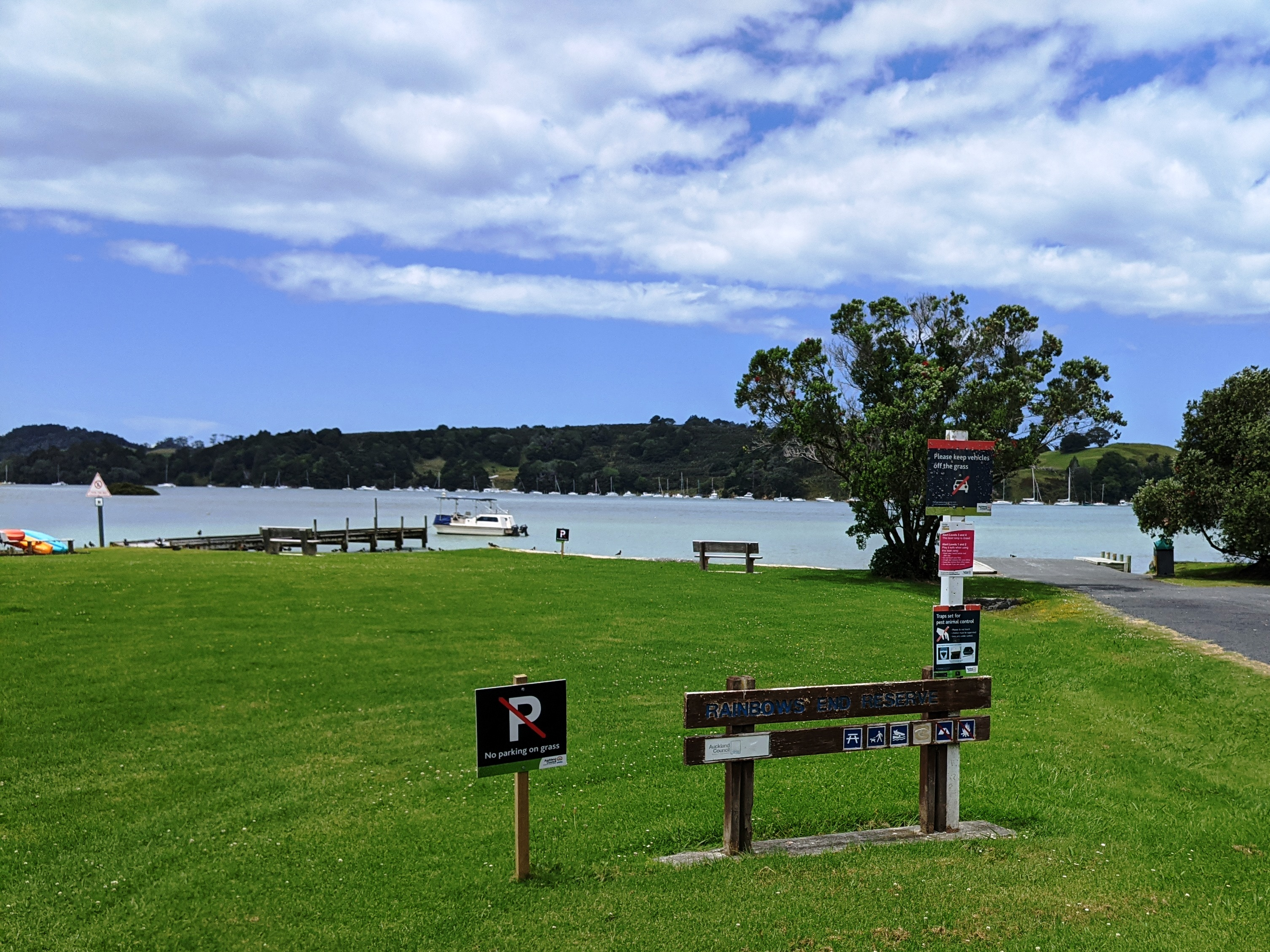
- Rainbows End Reserve
- Interactive map of Rainbows End
- Coordinates: 36.386°S 174.719°E
- Country: New Zealand
- Region: Auckland Region
- Ward: Rodney ward
- Community board: Rodney Local Board
- Subdivision: Warkworth subdivision
- Electorates: Kaipara ki Mahurangi; Te Tai Tokerau

Government
  - Territorial Authority: Auckland Council
  - Mayor of Auckland: Wayne Brown
  - Kaipara ki Mahurangi MP: Chris Penk
  - Te Tai Tokerau MP: Mariameno Kapa-Kingi

Area
  - Total: 0.22 km^{2} (0.085 sq mi)

Population (June 2025)
  - Total: 90
  - Density: 410/km^{2} (1,100/sq mi)

Rainbows End is a rural settlement at the end of Green Road between the Oak River and Matakana River in Auckland Region. Matakana is 4.5 km (2.8 mi) to the north. Sandspit is across the Oak River directly south.

Rainbows End Reserve is a small waterfront park with a boat ramp and jetty.

== Demographics ==
Statistics New Zealand describes Rainbows End as a rural settlement, which covers 0.22 km^{2} (0.085 sq mi) and had an estimated population of 90 as of June 2025, with a population density of 409 people per km^{2}. Rainbows End is part of the larger Dome Valley-Matakana statistical area.

Historical population
Year	Pop.	±% p.a.
2006	81	—
2013	81	+0.00%
2018	111	+6.50%
2023	96	−2.86%

Rainbows End had a population of 96 in the 2023 New Zealand census, a decrease of 15 people (−13.5%) since the 2018 census, and an increase of 15 people (18.5%) since the 2013 census. There were 42 males and 54 females in 45 dwellings. 6.2% of people identified as LGBTIQ+. The median age was 62.5 years (compared with 38.1 years nationally). There were 3 people (3.1%) aged under 15 years, 9 (9.4%) aged 15 to 29, 39 (40.6%) aged 30 to 64, and 45 (46.9%) aged 65 or older.

People could identify as more than one ethnicity. The results were 93.8% European (Pākehā), 6.2% Māori, and 6.2% Asian. English was spoken by 100.0%, and other languages by 9.4%. The percentage of people born overseas was 40.6, compared with 28.8% nationally.

Religious affiliations were 31.2% Christian, 3.1% Islam, and 3.1% other religions. People who answered that they had no religion were 59.4%, and 3.1% of people did not answer the census question.

Of those at least 15 years old, 21 (22.6%) people had a bachelor's or higher degree, 39 (41.9%) had a post-high school certificate or diploma, and 18 (19.4%) people exclusively held high school qualifications. The median income was $37,400, compared with $41,500 nationally. 12 people (12.9%) earned over $100,000 compared to 12.1% nationally. The employment status of those at least 15 was that 30 (32.3%) people were employed full-time and 15 (16.1%) were part-time.
