= Tāwharanui Peninsula =

Peninisula in the North Island of New Zealand

- Peninsula
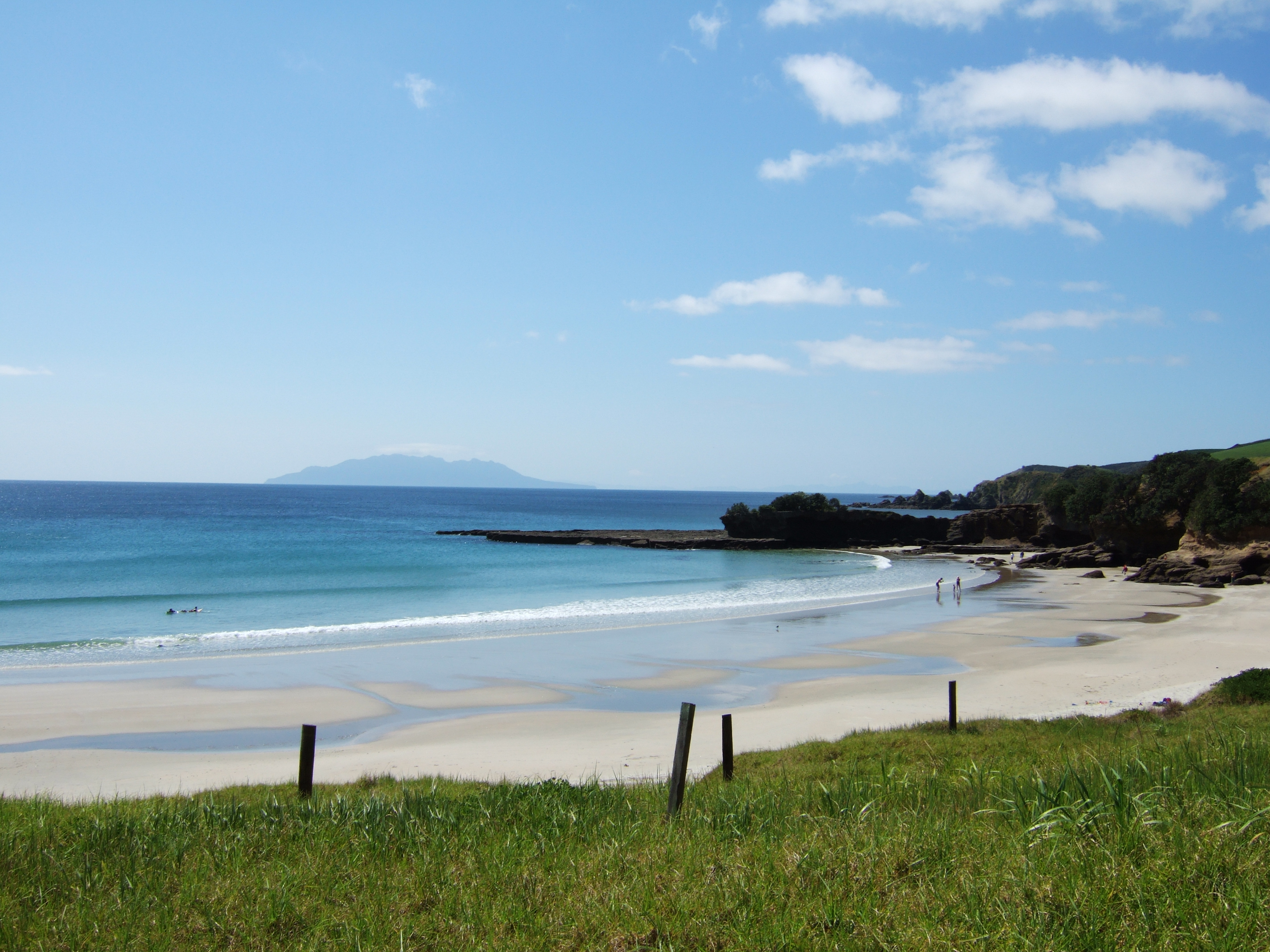
- Tāwharanui Regional Park at low tide

- Location within North Island
- Coordinates: 36.37°S 174.80°E
- Location: Auckland, New Zealand
- Water bodies: Hauraki Gulf

Area
  - Total: 46.67 square kilometres (18.02 sq mi)

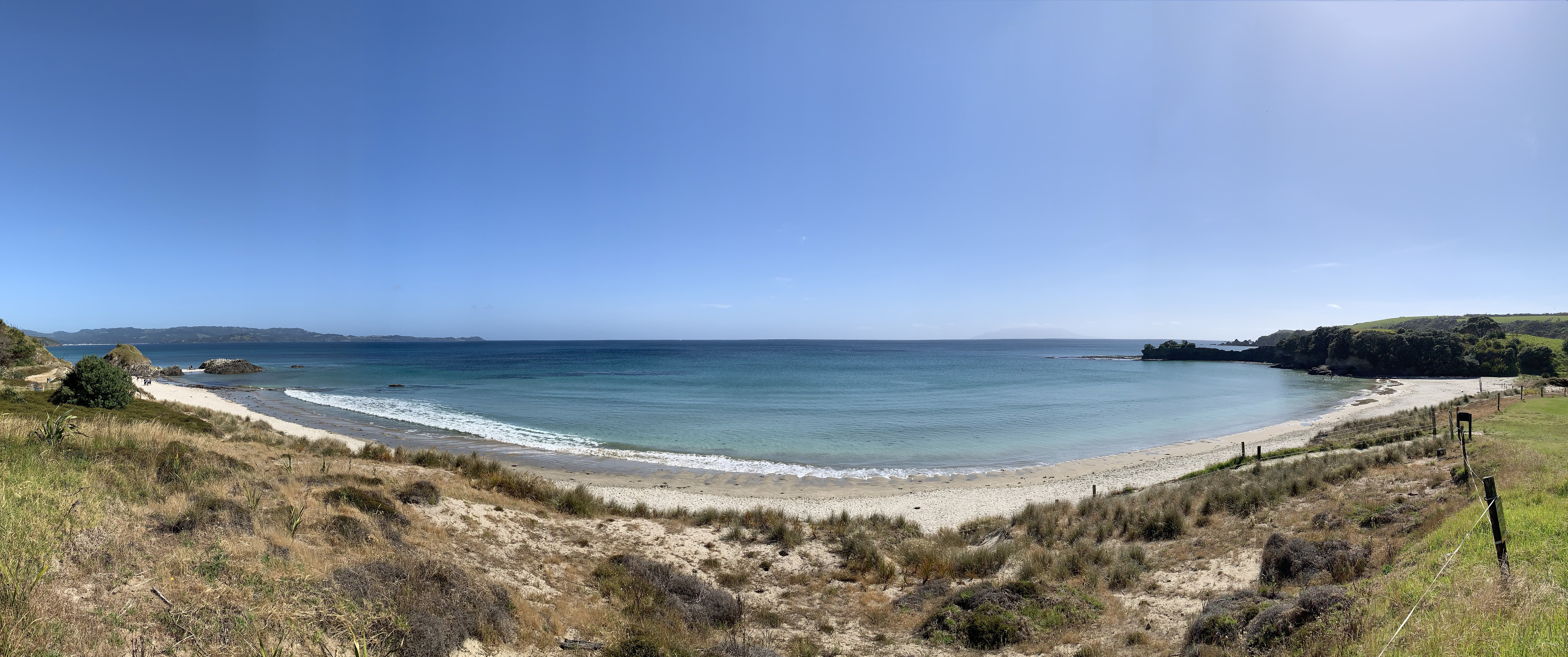
Tāwharanui Regional Park, Anchor Bay beach view at high tide

Tāwharanui Peninsula is a finger of land projecting into the Hauraki Gulf from the east coast of the much larger North Auckland Peninsula of New Zealand. It separates Ōmaha Bay to the north from Kawau Bay and Kawau Island to the south. The nearest sizable town is Warkworth.

Tāwharanui Regional Park covers 588 hectares of the peninsula's land and Tāwharanui Marine Reserve covers the northern coastal sea. Both are administered by Auckland Council which also owns the regional park.

Geologically the peninsula consists of Waitemata Sandstone on top of folded and uplifted greywacke.

Tāwharanui Marine Park was established offshore of the peninsula in 1981 as New Zealand's first Marine Protected Area. The marine park was replaced by Tāwharanui Marine Reserve in September 2011.

The North Island brown kiwi was reintroduced into the area in 2006-2007.

== History ==
Māori lived in the area for over 800 years. The Māori name Tāwhara-nui refers to "the abundant bracts of the kiekie vine". By the time of European settlement of the Tawharanui Peninsula the peninsula was occupied by Ngati Raupo, who had several settlements (kainga) on the peninsula. These people would travel from the peninsula up to the Matakana River and to the Whangateau Harbour during seasonal migration periods.

Tāwharanui was sold by the Māori owners in 1873–1877 and developed as a farm by the Martin, Jones and Young families. Kauri timber was milled and manuka cut for firewood for many years. Shingle was extracted for a hundred years, creating the Jones Bay Lagoon. Nine vessels were wrecked on the Tāwharanui coastline between 1871 and 1978. Anchor Bay is named after the anchor of the Phoenix, wrecked in 1879. The Auckland Regional Authority, forerunner of the Auckland Council, purchased the parkland from the Georgetti family in 1973.

== Demographics ==
Tawharanui Peninsula statistical area covers the area east of Matakana and Sandspit, including Ōmaha, Point Wells, Baddeleys Beach-Campbells Beach and Buckleton Beach. It covers 46.70 km^{2} (18.03 sq mi) and had an estimated population of 2,230 as of June 2025, with a population density of 48 people per km^{2}.

Historical population
Year	Pop.	±% p.a.
2006	1,365	—
2013	1,620	+2.48%
2018	1,962	+3.91%
2023	2,187	+2.20%

Tawharanui Peninsula had a population of 2,187 in the 2023 New Zealand census, an increase of 225 people (11.5%) since the 2018 census, and an increase of 567 people (35.0%) since the 2013 census. There were 1,059 males and 1,128 females in 894 dwellings. 1.4% of people identified as LGBTIQ+. The median age was 55.4 years (compared with 38.1 years nationally). There were 333 people (15.2%) aged under 15 years, 195 (8.9%) aged 15 to 29, 930 (42.5%) aged 30 to 64, and 729 (33.3%) aged 65 or older.

People could identify as more than one ethnicity. The results were 96.4% European (Pākehā); 7.7% Māori; 2.1% Pasifika; 2.2% Asian; 0.4% Middle Eastern, Latin American and African New Zealanders (MELAA); and 1.4% other, which includes people giving their ethnicity as "New Zealander". English was spoken by 98.2%, Māori language by 0.8%, Samoan by 0.3%, and other languages by 8.0%. No language could be spoken by 1.2% (e.g. too young to talk). New Zealand Sign Language was known by 0.1%. The percentage of people born overseas was 18.9, compared with 28.8% nationally.

Religious affiliations were 29.9% Christian, 0.1% Buddhist, 0.3% New Age, 0.1% Jewish, and 1.1% other religions. People who answered that they had no religion were 62.0%, and 6.4% of people did not answer the census question.

Of those at least 15 years old, 417 (22.5%) people had a bachelor's or higher degree, 1,032 (55.7%) had a post-high school certificate or diploma, and 273 (14.7%) people exclusively held high school qualifications. The median income was $42,400, compared with $41,500 nationally. 348 people (18.8%) earned over $100,000 compared to 12.1% nationally. The employment status of those at least 15 was that 687 (37.1%) people were employed full-time, 378 (20.4%) were part-time, and 18 (1.0%) were unemployed.

== See also ==
- List of marine reserves in New Zealand
