= Baddeleys Beach-Campbells Beach =

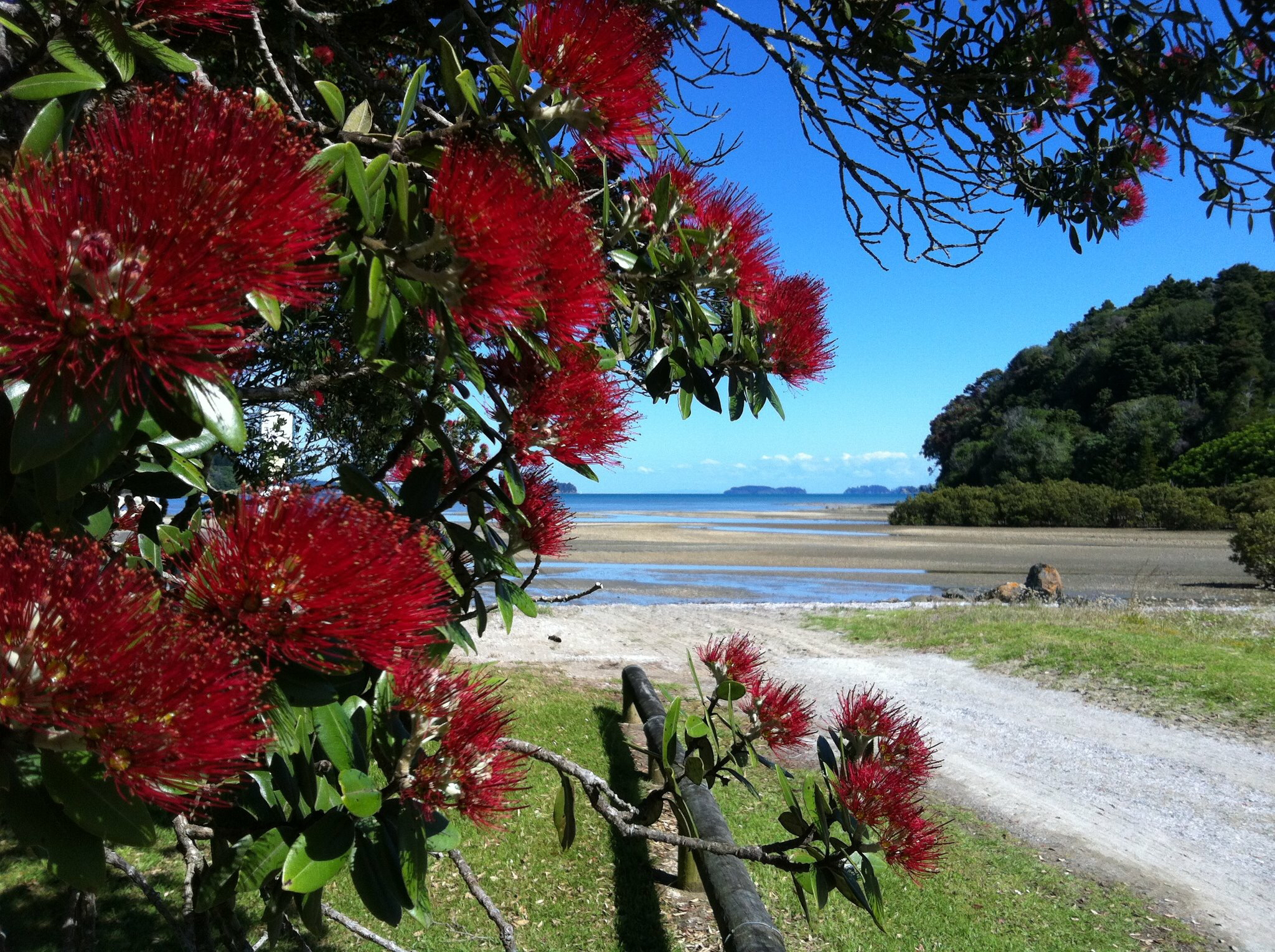
- Pōhutukawa at Baddeleys Beach on Millon Bay
- Interactive map of Baddeleys Beach-Campbells Beach
- Coordinates: 36.381°S 174.758°E
- Country: New Zealand
- Region: Auckland Region
- Ward: Rodney ward
- Community board: Rodney Local Board
- Subdivision: Warkworth subdivision
- Electorates: Kaipara ki Mahurangi; Te Tai Tokerau

Government
  - Territorial Authority: Auckland Council
  - Mayor of Auckland: Wayne Brown
  - Kaipara ki Mahurangi MP: Chris Penk
  - Te Tai Tokerau MP: Mariameno Kapa-Kingi

Area
  - Total: 0.36 km^{2} (0.14 sq mi)

Population (June 2025)
  - Total: 90
  - Density: 250/km^{2} (650/sq mi)

Baddeleys Beach and Campbells Beach are a contiguous settlement on adjacent beaches on the southern side of Tāwharanui Peninsula in the Auckland Region of New Zealand. The beaches are on Millon Bay, which is a part of Kawau Bay.

== Geography ==
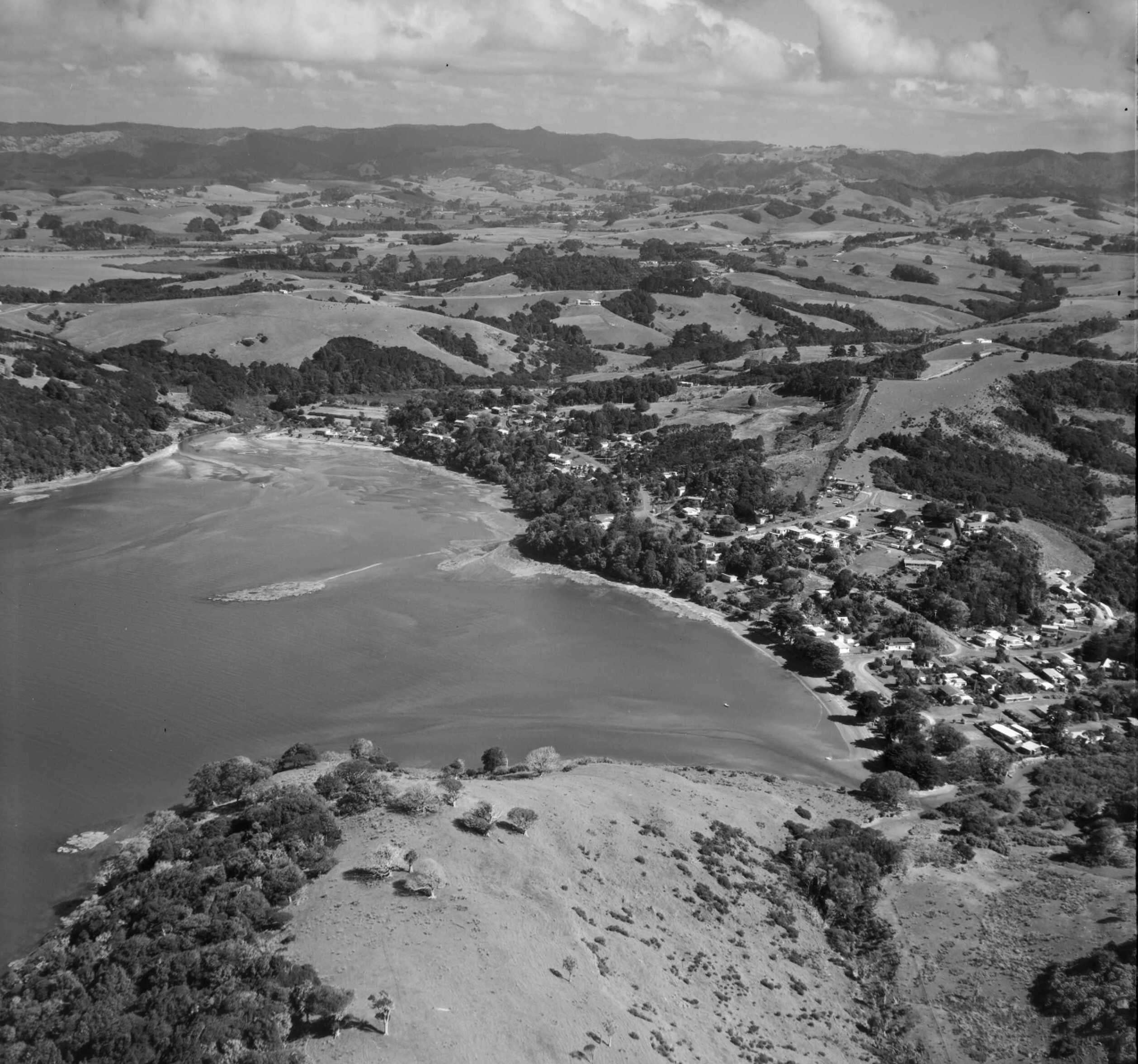
Aerial view of Millons Bay in 1987, with Baddeleys Beach on the left and Campbells Beach on the right

Baddeleys Beach and Campbells Beach are located on the southern Tāwharanui Peninsula, in the Rodney District of the Auckland Region. Both settlements are found next to Millon Bay, a bay within the wider Kawau Bay area of the Hauraki Gulf.

The Millon Bay area is primarily formed from Waitemata Group sandstone, with the modern bay being formed at the end of the Last Glacial Maximum, when the sea level rose approximately 130 m (430 ft) to current levels between 13,000 and 6,000 years ago. By the 19th century, the area was covered by kauri and other native trees.

== History ==
=== Māori history ===
The mana whenua of the Baddeleys Beach-Campbells Beach area are Ngāti Manuhiri. The Moekākara migratory waka arrived in New Zealand at Te Waka Tuwhenua near Goat Island / Te Hāwere-a-Maki. Ngāti Manuhiri descend from the people of the Moekākara who settled in the area, Te Kawerau people of the Auckland Region who descent from the Tainui waka, and from Ngātiwai of Northland. In the mid-17th century, the warrior Maki migrated from the Kāwhia Harbour to his ancestral home in the Auckland Region. Maki conquered and unified many of the Tāmaki Māori tribes, including Ngāi Tāhuhu who lived in the Baddeleys Beach-Campbells Beach area. Maki's sons Manuhiri and Maraeariki settled in the area, with Ngāti Raupō (descending from Maraeariki) focusing life on the Tāwharanui Peninsula, while Ngāti Manuhiri settled the Whangateau Harbour north to Pākiri.

By the mid-1700s, Marutūāhu tribes from the Hauraki Gulf, especially Ngāti Pāoa, sought to control the shark fishery located on the Mahurangi coast, between Kawau Island and the Whangaparāoa Peninsula. War broke out between Ngāti Pāoa and the Kawerau hapū, which included a major battle at Te Ngaere (Christian Bay), adjacent to Millon Bay. By the early 19th century, Kawerau-descended hapū held exclusive land rights to the Mahurangi, while fishing rights were shared between these hapū and the Marutūāhu tribes.

During the Musket Wars of the 1820s the majority of Ngāti Manuhiri fled the area, returning in the 1830s.

=== Early colonial period ===
In 1839, members of Ngāti Pāoa sold the Te Pau block to European settlers Thomas Millon and James Skelton, an area of approximately 5,000 acres (2,000 ha) that included Baddeleys Beach-Campbells Beach. After the signing of the Treaty of Waitangi in 1840, private land purchases were reviewed by the Crown, leaving Millon with an area of 2,560 acres (1,040 ha), and eventually alienating Ngāti Manuhiri from their traditional lands in the area. In 1841, the Crown undertook the Mahurangi Purchase, which involved all land on the eastern coast between Takapuna and Te Ārai. The wider Matakana area saw over forty European families settle in the 1860s. The kauri forests around Millon Bay were logged by early European settlers, after which the land was cleared and developed into dairy farms by the Baddeley and Campbell families.

=== Coastal community development ===
Baddeleys Beach and Campbells Beach developed as residential communities in 1958, at a time when many beachfront areas in the wider Auckland Region were being developed as subdivisions and holiday settlements. During this time, blocks of former farmland land were sold off for the building of baches, many of which were constructed in the mid-1960s. These subsequently were upgraded to or replaced by permanent dwellings. A second surge in residential housing development began in the mid-1990s.

== Demographics ==
Statistics New Zealand describes Baddeleys Beach-Campbells Beach as a rural settlement, which covers 0.36 km^{2} (0.14 sq mi) and had an estimated population of 90 as of June 2025, with a population density of 250 people per km^{2}. The settlement is part of the larger Tawharanui Peninsula statistical area.

Historical population
Year	Pop.	±% p.a.
2006	87	—
2013	63	−4.51%
2018	84	+5.92%
2023	96	+2.71%

Baddeleys Beach-Campbells Beach had a population of 96 in the 2023 New Zealand census, an increase of 12 people (14.3%) since the 2018 census, and an increase of 33 people (52.4%) since the 2013 census. There were 48 males and 42 females in 39 dwellings. 3.1% of people identified as LGBTIQ+. The median age was 63.3 years (compared with 38.1 years nationally). There were 9 people (9.4%) aged under 15 years, 9 (9.4%) aged 15 to 29, 36 (37.5%) aged 30 to 64, and 45 (46.9%) aged 65 or older.

People could identify as more than one ethnicity. The results were 90.6% European (Pākehā); 6.2% Māori; 3.1% Pasifika; 9.4% Asian; and 3.1% Middle Eastern, Latin American and African New Zealanders (MELAA). English was spoken by 93.8%, Māori language by 3.1%, and other languages by 12.5%. No language could be spoken by 3.1% (e.g. too young to talk). The percentage of people born overseas was 18.8, compared with 28.8% nationally.

Religious affiliations were 18.8% Christian, and 3.1% other religions. People who answered that they had no religion were 68.8%, and 6.2% of people did not answer the census question.

Of those at least 15 years old, 15 (17.2%) people had a bachelor's or higher degree, 45 (51.7%) had a post-high school certificate or diploma, and 18 (20.7%) people exclusively held high school qualifications. The median income was $36,800, compared with $41,500 nationally. 12 people (13.8%) earned over $100,000 compared to 12.1% nationally. The employment status of those at least 15 was that 27 (31.0%) people were employed full-time, 15 (17.2%) were part-time, and 3 (3.4%) were unemployed.

== Amenities ==
Baddeleys Beach Reserve and Campbells Beach Reserve give public access to the beaches at each end of the settlement and provide basic amenities.

== Bibliography ==
- Peart, Raweyn (2009). Castles in the Sand: What's Happening to the New Zealand Coast?. Nelson: Craig Potten Publishing. ISBN 9781877517006.
