= List of statues of George V =

This is a list of statues of King George V of the United Kingdom and aboard.

Image	Location	Date	Sculptor
A close up of the statue on top of the plinth	Old Palace Yard, Westminster, London	1947	William Reid Dick
	Matakana War Memorial, Matakana, New Zealand	1920	William Henry Feldon
	Arawa War Memorial, Rotorua, New Zealand	1927	William Henry Feldon
	Queensway Tunnel, Liverpool, United Kingdom	1934	Goscombe John
	Coronation Park, Delhi, India	1935	Charles Sargeant Jagger (completed by Peter Induni and William Reid Dick)
	Adelaide Street, King George Square, Brisbane, Queensland, Australia	1938	Edward Frederick Kohler
	Sturt & Doveton Streets, Ballarat, Victoria, Australia	1938	Victor Greenhalgh
	Gheringhap Street & Gordon Avenue, Johnstone Park, Geelong, Victoria, Australia	1938	Wallace Anderson
	Howard College School of Law, University of KwaZulu-Natal, Durban, South Africa	1938	
	Flower Bazaar Police Station, George Town, Chennai, India	1938	M S Nagappa
	Saint Saviour, Jersey	1939	Francis Doyle-Jones & William Reid Dick
	Pall Mall, Conservatory Gardens, Bendigo, Victoria, Australia	1939	John Elischer
	Sir Edwin Smith Drive, Angas Gardens, North Adelaide, South Australia	1950	Maurice Lambert
	King George V Memorial, St Kilda Road, Kings Domain, Melbourne, Victoria, Australia Vandalised June 2024; severed head displayed at a hip hop concert in March 2025.	1952	W. Leslie Bowles
	King George V Memorial, King George Terrace, Old Parliament House, Parkes, Canberra, Australia	1953	Rayner Hoff
	King George V, marble portrait statue, formerly situated at the Flower Bazaar Police Station, Madras, now at the Rashtrapati Bhavan, New Delhi.	1916	Bertram Mackennal

== See also ==
- List of statues of Queen Victoria
- List of statues of British royalty in London
- Royal monuments in the United Kingdom
