= Mahurangi River =

River in the Auckland Region, New Zealand

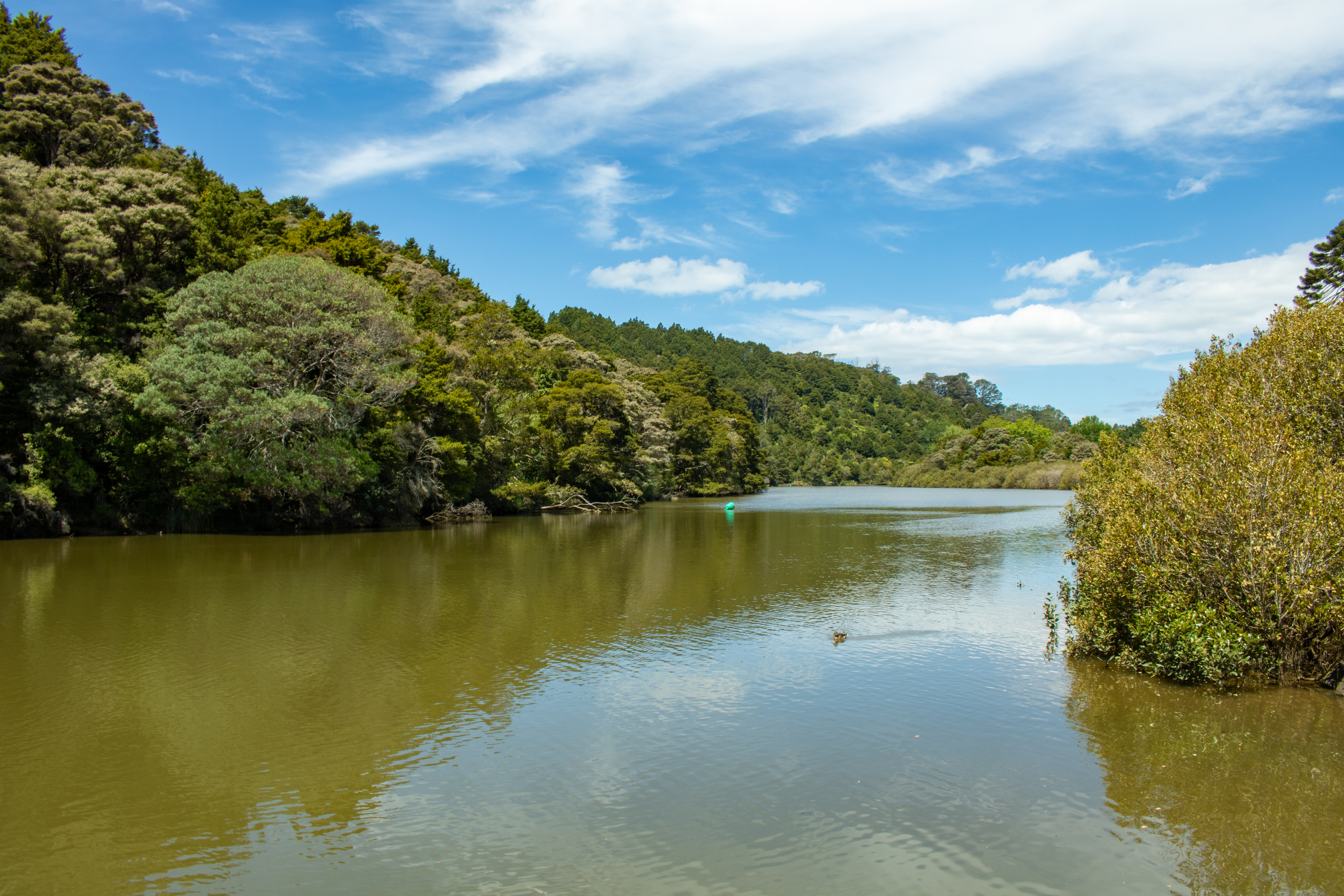
- Mahurangi River at Warkworth

- Mouth of the Mahurangi River Mahurangi River (New Zealand)
- Route of the Mahurangi River

Location
- Country: New Zealand
- Region: Auckland Region
- Ward: Rodney

Physical characteristics
- Source: Dome Forest (left branch)
  - coordinates: 36.36000°S 174.61588°E
- 2nd source: Moir Hill (right branch)
  - coordinates: 36.46738°S 174.61155°E
- Mouth: Mahurangi Harbour
  - coordinates: 36.4401°S 174.7174°E

Basin features
- Progression: Mahurangi River → Mahurangi Harbour → Hauraki Gulf
- Tributaries
  - left: Duck Creek

The Mahurangi River in northern New Zealand flows through the town of Warkworth and into Mahurangi Harbour, which opens into the outer Hauraki Gulf. The Left Branch of the river rises in the Dome and flows through the Dome Valley, while the Right Branch rises on Moir Hill. The lower part is a tidal estuary that ranges in depth from below approximately 50 centimetres (20 inches) at the channel entrance to approximately 150 centimetres (59 inches) further upstream. The Mahurangi Harbour provides a sheltered anchorage for private pleasure craft in all weathers.

== History ==
Approximately 17,000 years ago during the Last Glacial Period when sea levels were significantly lower, the Mahurangi River flowed into the vast coastal plain that existed where the modern Hauraki Gulf exists. The river met the Waitematā Harbour (then a river) east of Kawau Island, and flowed north-east between modern day Little Barrier Island and Great Barrier Island, eventually emptying into the Pacific Ocean north of Great Barrier Island.

In colonial New Zealand, the river was the main link between Warkworth and the rest of the colony. A portland cement works opened in 1884 beside the river just south-east of Warkworth and many scows and steamers used it to export the cement. The works closed in 1929 and the ruins remain on the banks of the river behind what has become a marina.

Warkworth was originally known as Brown's Mill, in reference to the sawmill established by Brown on the banks of the Mahurangi when the area was just a timber camp. The timber was transported by the river and often consisted of kauri spars, which were commonly exported. Sandstone from New South Wales was used as ballast and this was dropped at the mouth of the river, where large quantities can still be found. The kauri spars were then loaded for the return trip to Australia.

== Features ==
There are two boat yards on the Mahurangi river: one owned by the Portland Cement Works ruins and the other further upstream owned by Warkworth. These yards offer both haul-out and hardstand options for small and large craft. Warkworth has a number of small cafés, supermarkets, other stores and a post office. There is a moderately large wharf with a floating pontoon by the waters edge, although the river all but dries out there at low tide. The river itself has many small tributary streams that enter at different points along its length.

There are several waterfalls on the river. The navigable portion of the Mahurangi river ends at the lower-most falls near the western end of the village, where, since the 1860s, the river has been dammed twice and several bridges have been installed. A tsunami from the 1877 Iquique earthquake elevated the tide by six feet in mere minutes. There are currently two bridges remaining: a concrete bridge installed in 1971, which was originally used for a tramway but is now a pedestrian bridge; and a more recent bridge with two lanes for traffic.

== Gallery ==
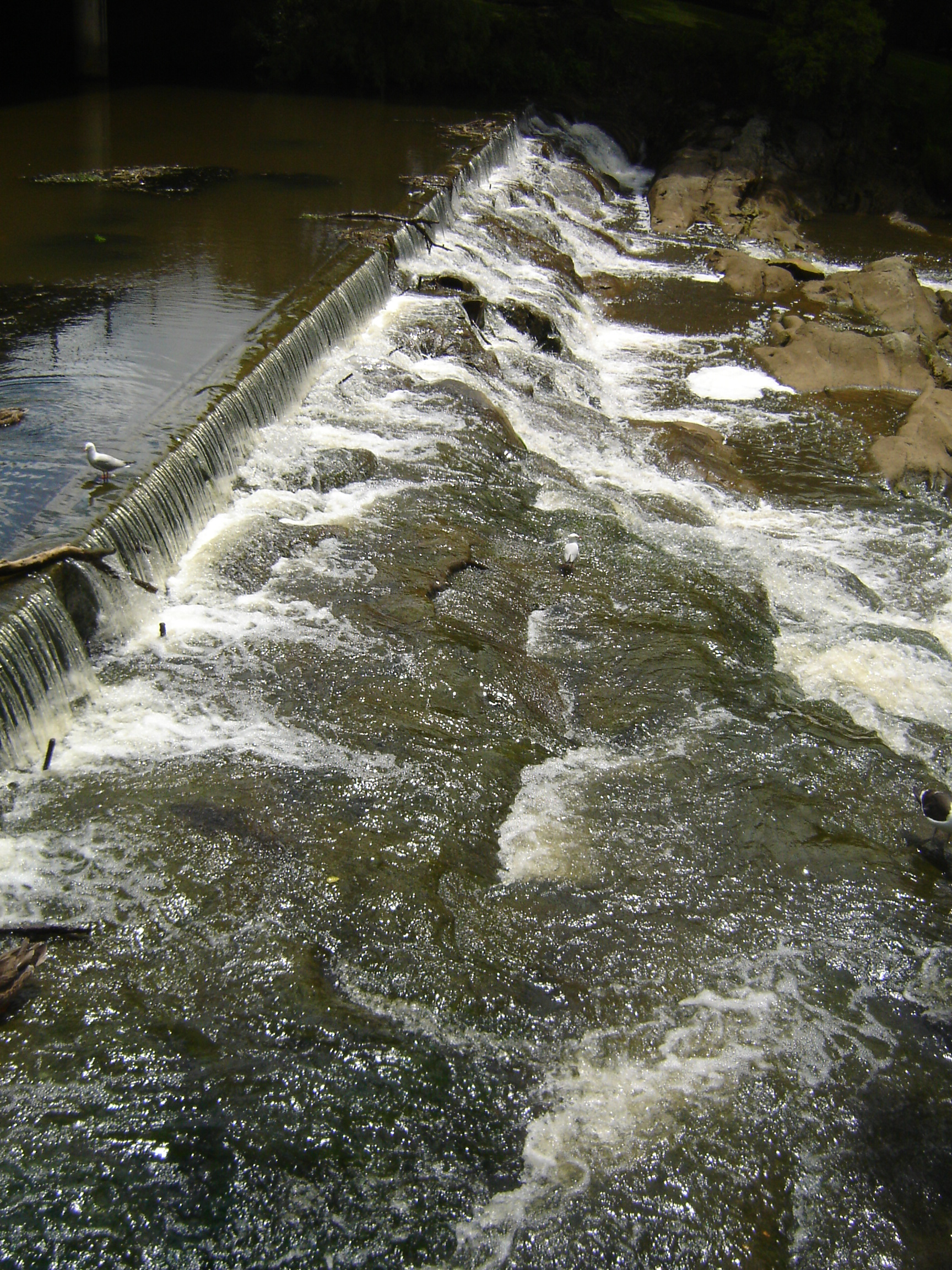
A weir at Warkworth

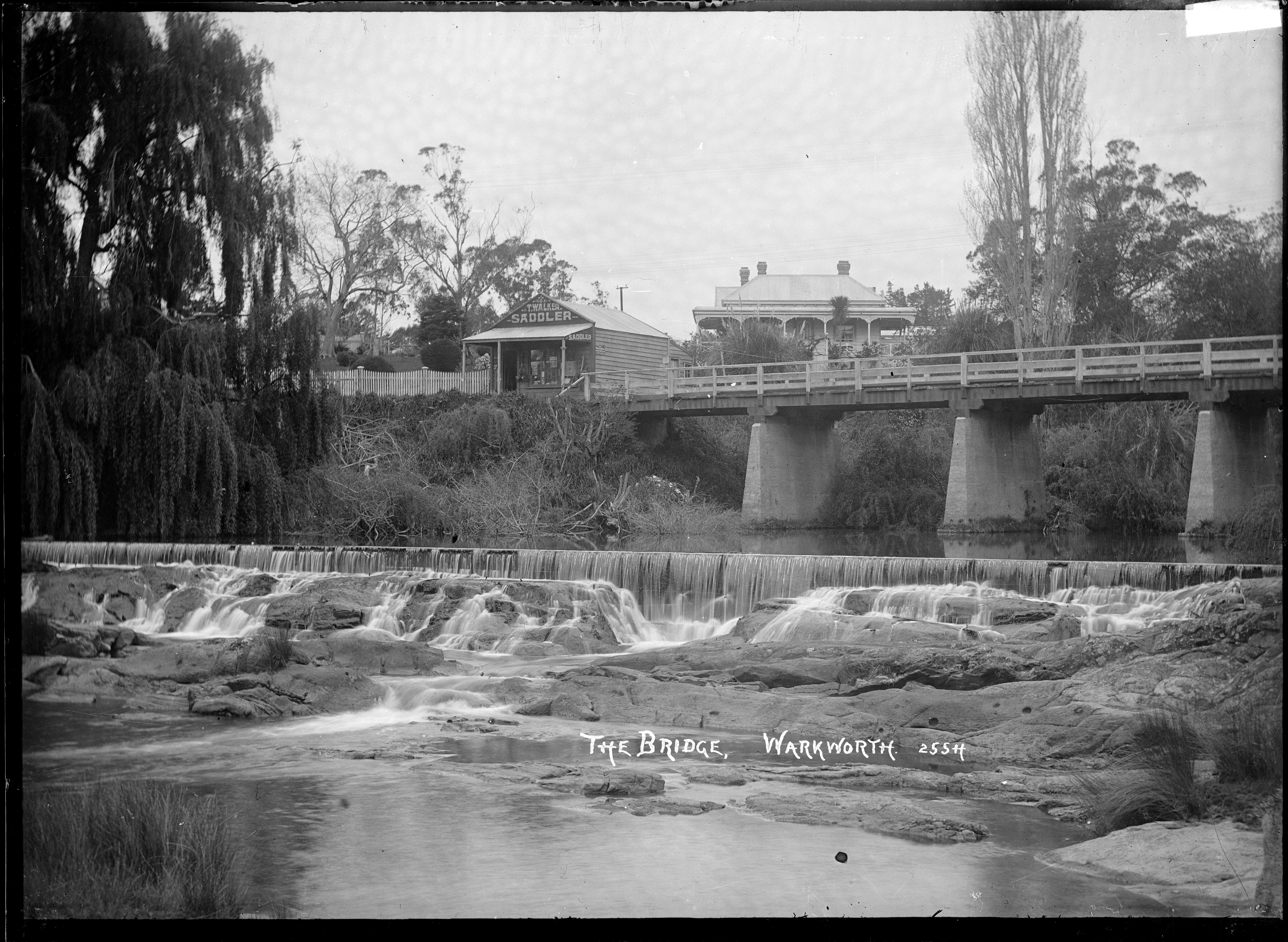
View of the Warkworth Bridge over the Mahurangi River (circa 1910)

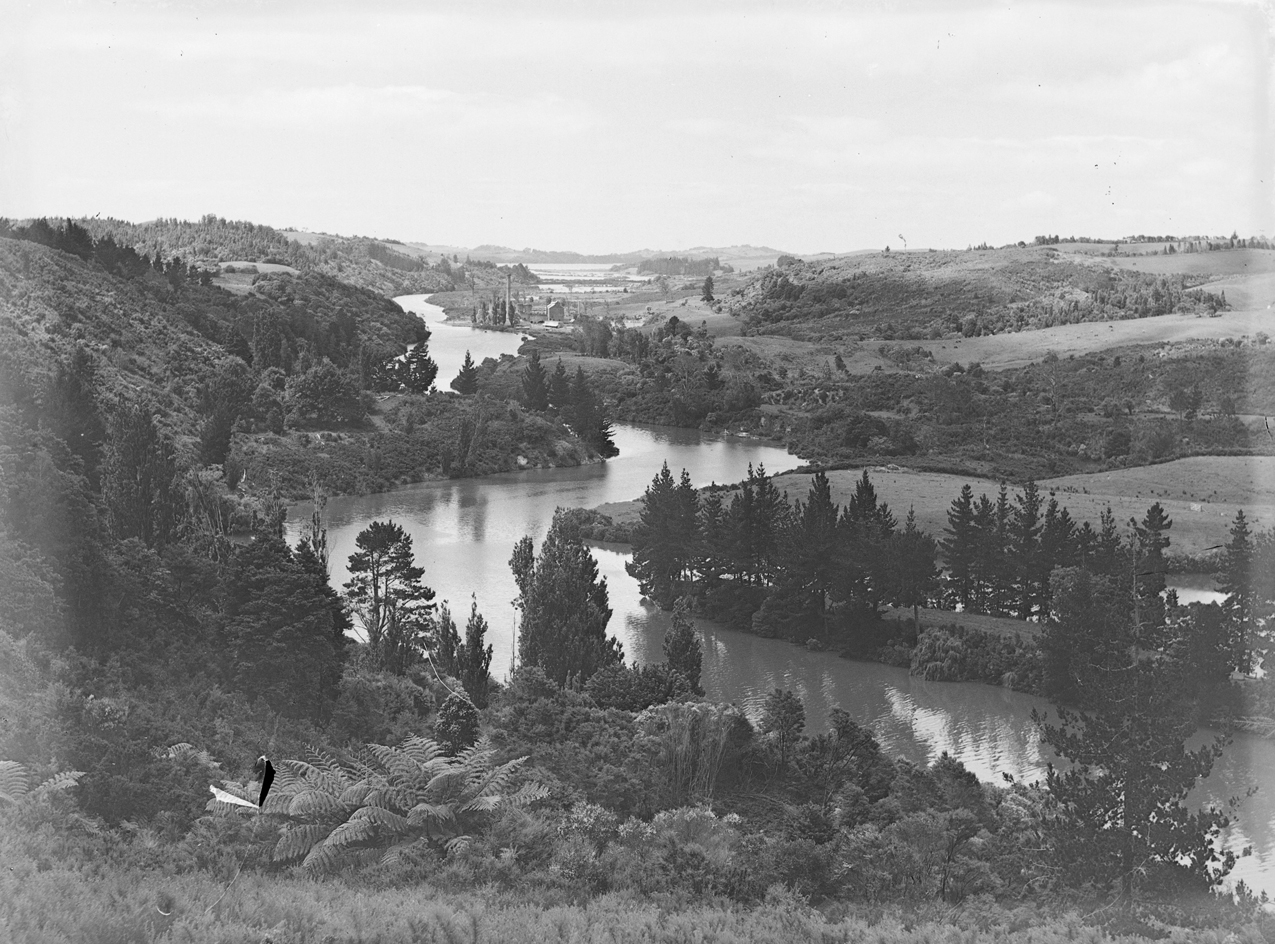
View of the Mahurangi River at Warkworth (circa 1940s)
