= Dome Valley =

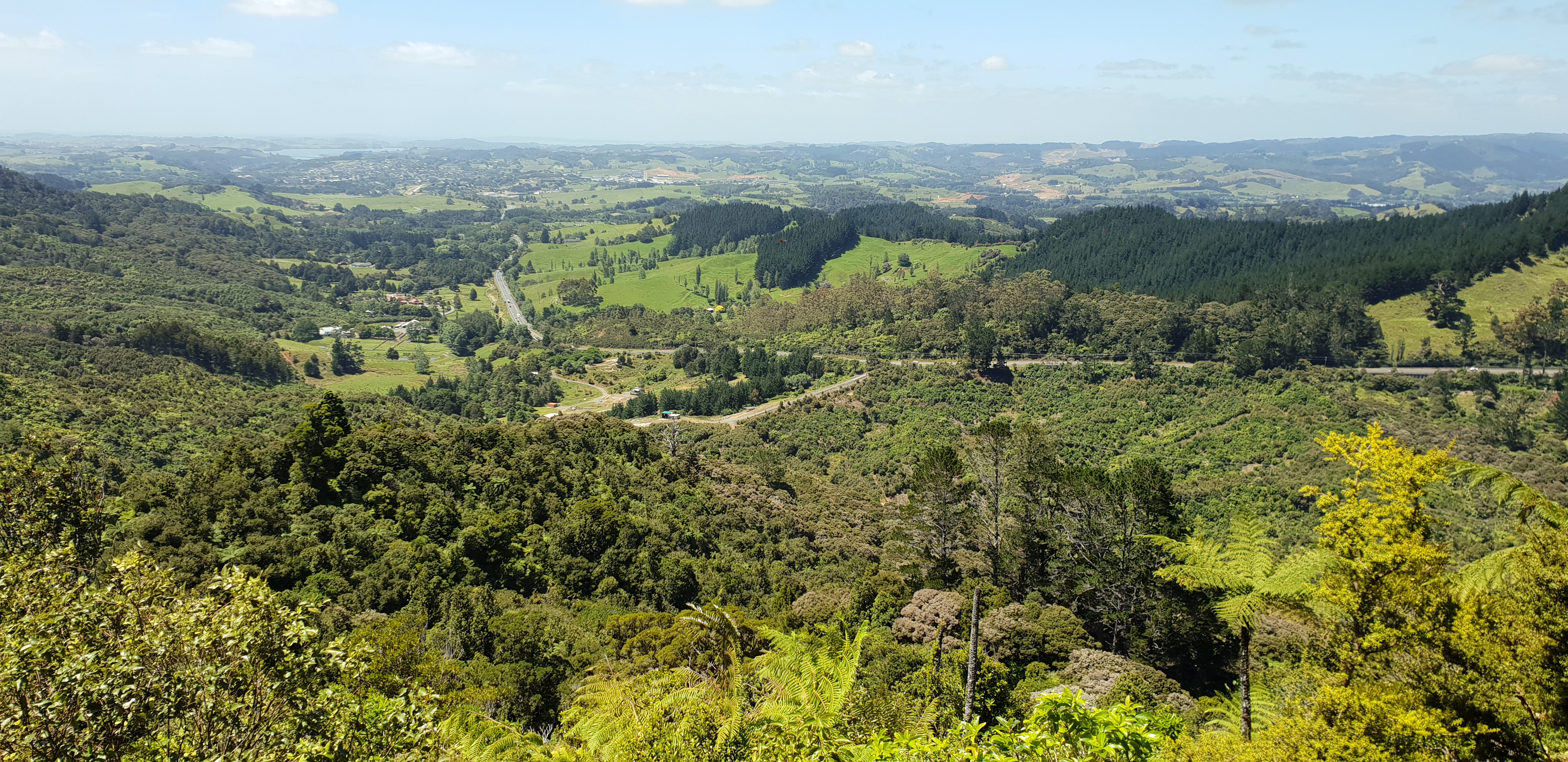
- Interactive map of Dome Valley
- Coordinates: 36.37216424°S 174.61833610°E
- Country: New Zealand
- Region: Auckland Region
- Ward: Rodney
- Community board: Rodney Local Board
- Subdivision: Wellsford subdivision
- Electorates: Kaipara ki Mahurangi; Te Tai Tokerau

Government
  - Type: Territorial authority
  - Body: Auckland Council
  - Mayor of Auckland: Wayne Brown
  - Kaipara ki Mahurangi MP: Jessica Rowe
  - Te Tai Tokerau MP: TBD

Area
  - Total: 42.63 km^{2} (16.46 sq mi)

Population (2023 Census)
  - Total: 261
  - Density: 6.12/km^{2} (15.9/sq mi)

Dome Valley is a rural area in the northern Auckland Region of New Zealand. It is situated between the towns of Warkworth and Wellsford. State Highway 1 and the Left Branch of the Mahurangi River run through the valley.

== Demographics ==
Dome Valley is covered by two SA1 statistical areas, which cover 42.63 km^{2} (16.46 sq mi). Dome Valley is part of the larger Dome Valley-Matakana statistical area.

Historical population
Year	Pop.	±% p.a.
2006	225	—
2013	261	+2.14%
2018	249	−0.94%
2023	261	+0.95%

Port Albert	Whangaripo	Pākiri
Tauhoa	Dome Valley	Matakana
Dome Forest	Warkworth	Sandspit

The SA1 statistical areas had a population of 261 in the 2023 New Zealand census, an increase of 12 people (4.8%) since the 2018 census, and unchanged since the 2013 census. There were 126 males and 132 females in 87 dwellings. 2.3% of people identified as LGBTIQ+. There were 48 people (18.4%) aged under 15 years, 36 (13.8%) aged 15 to 29, 126 (48.3%) aged 30 to 64, and 48 (18.4%) aged 65 or older.

People could identify as more than one ethnicity. The results were 88.5% European (Pākehā); 23.0% Māori; 2.3% Pasifika; 5.7% Asian; 1.1% Middle Eastern, Latin American and African New Zealanders (MELAA); and 2.3% other, which includes people giving their ethnicity as "New Zealander". English was spoken by 96.6%, Māori language by 4.6%, and other languages by 9.2%. No language could be spoken by 1.1% (e.g. too young to talk). New Zealand Sign Language was known by 1.1%. The percentage of people born overseas was 19.5, compared with 28.8% nationally.

Religious affiliations were 27.6% Christian, and 3.4% Māori religious beliefs. People who answered that they had no religion were 59.8%, and 9.2% of people did not answer the census question.

Of those at least 15 years old, 39 (18.3%) people had a bachelor's or higher degree, 99 (46.5%) had a post-high school certificate or diploma, and 54 (25.4%) people exclusively held high school qualifications. 24 people (11.3%) earned over $100,000 compared to 12.1% nationally. The employment status of those at least 15 was that 90 (42.3%) people were employed full-time, 36 (16.9%) were part-time, and 12 (5.6%) were unemployed.

== Landfill controversy ==
A controversial proposal to build a landfill in the area caused protests and demonstrations from environmental groups in Auckland in the early 2020s. It was approved despite stiff opposition, and Waste Management New Zealand would construct and operate 60 hectares of landfill after given consent to do so.

It was controversial because it would have an ecological impact on the area; it would contaminate local waterways, such as the Kaipara Harbour's water catchment. Waste Management New Zealand further had an application for a plan change to use 1000 hectares of land in the Dome Valley site recognised as a "landfill precinct".

The plan change was further declined by Auckland Council.

== Attractions ==
Attractions in Dome Valley include Sheepworld, a premier showcase for sheep and wool production, Dome Forest Walkway, a walkway going through the Dome Forest and Dome Valley Gun Club.
