= Buckleton Beach =

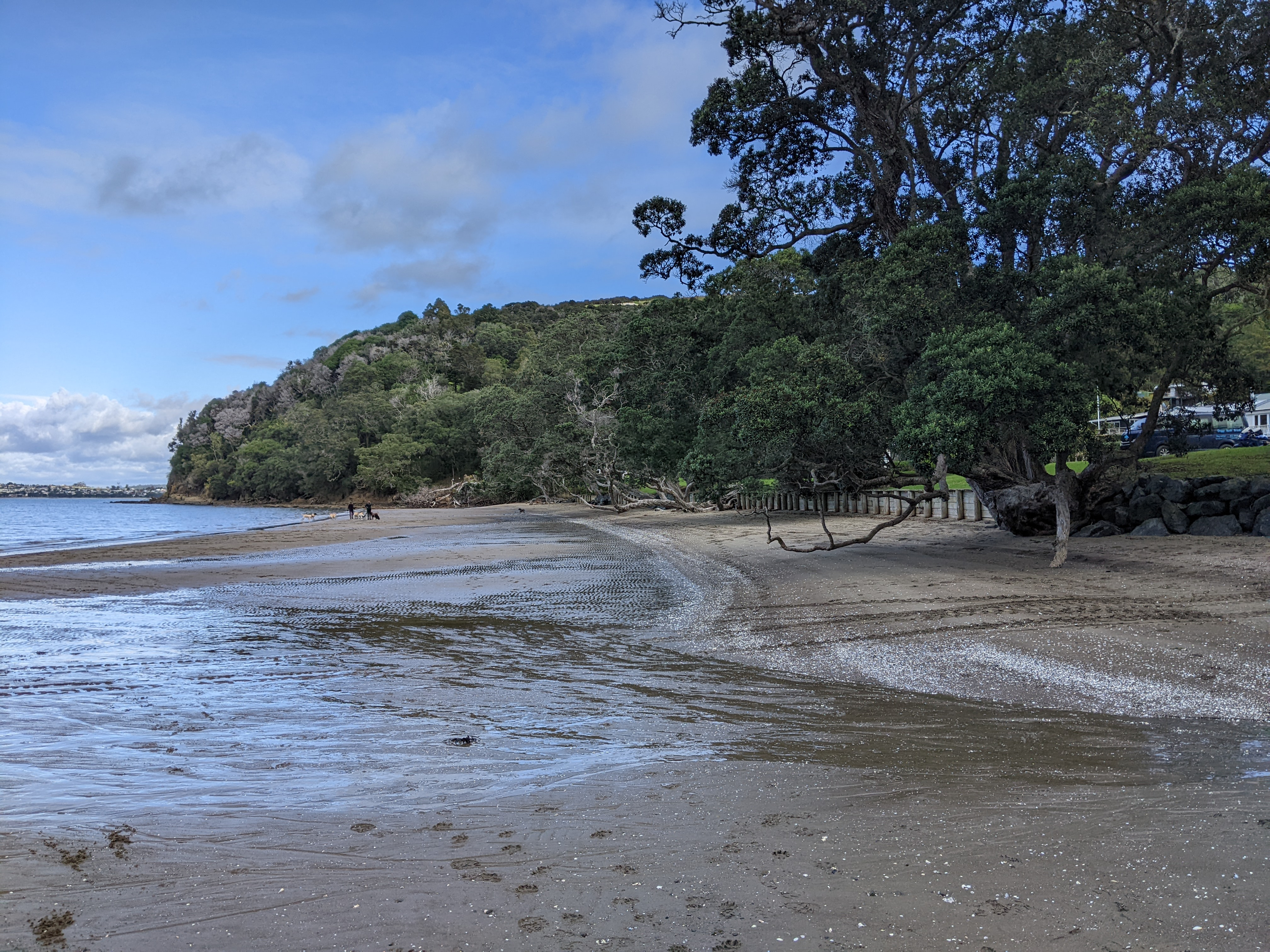
- Buckleton Beach
- Interactive map of Buckleton Beach
- Coordinates: 36.392°S 174.748°E
- Country: New Zealand
- Region: Auckland Region
- Ward: Rodney ward
- Community board: Rodney Local Board
- Subdivision: Warkworth subdivision
- Electorates: Kaipara ki Mahurangi; Te Tai Tokerau

Government
  - Territorial Authority: Auckland Council
  - Mayor of Auckland: Wayne Brown
  - Kaipara ki Mahurangi MP: Chris Penk
  - Te Tai Tokerau MP: Mariameno Kapa-Kingi

Area
  - Total: 0.13 km^{2} (0.050 sq mi)

Population (June 2025)
  - Total: 20
  - Density: 150/km^{2} (400/sq mi)

Buckleton Beach is a small settlement on the southern side of Tāwharanui Peninsula in the Auckland Region of New Zealand. The beach is on Wanns Bay, which is a part of Kawau Bay.

A property developer, Mr J G Buckleton, bought the land in 1954 and subdivided it in 1957.

Omaio is a garden covering 7.3 hectares (18 acres) near Buckleton Beach, developed since 2005 and named as being of International Significance by the New Zealand Gardens Trust.

== Demographics ==
Statistics New Zealand describes Buckleton Beach as a rural settlement, which covers 0.13 km^{2} (0.050 sq mi) and had an estimated population of 20 as of June 2025, with a population density of 154 people per km^{2}.

Historical population
Year	Pop.	±% p.a.
2013	6	—
2018	6	+0.00%
2023	15	+20.11%

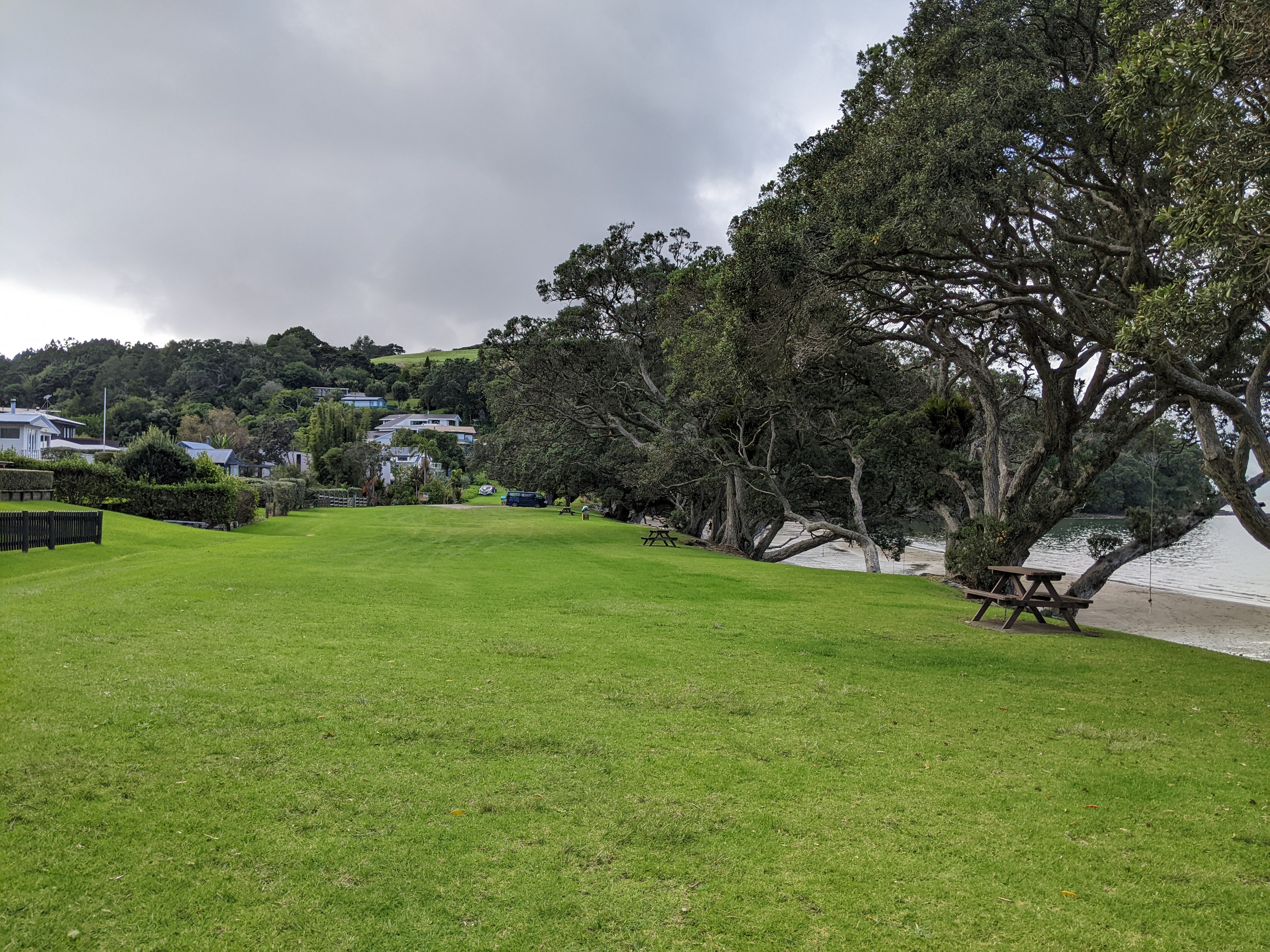
Buckleton Beach reserve

Buckleton Beach had a population of 15 in the 2023 New Zealand census, an increase of 9 people (150.0%) since the 2018 census, and an increase of 9 people (150.0%) since the 2013 census. There were 6 males and 9 females in 9 dwellings. The median age was 64.3 years (compared with 38.1 years nationally). There were 6 people (40.0%) aged 30 to 64, and 6 (40.0%) aged 65 or older.

All people who responded identified as European (Pākehā) and spoke English.
