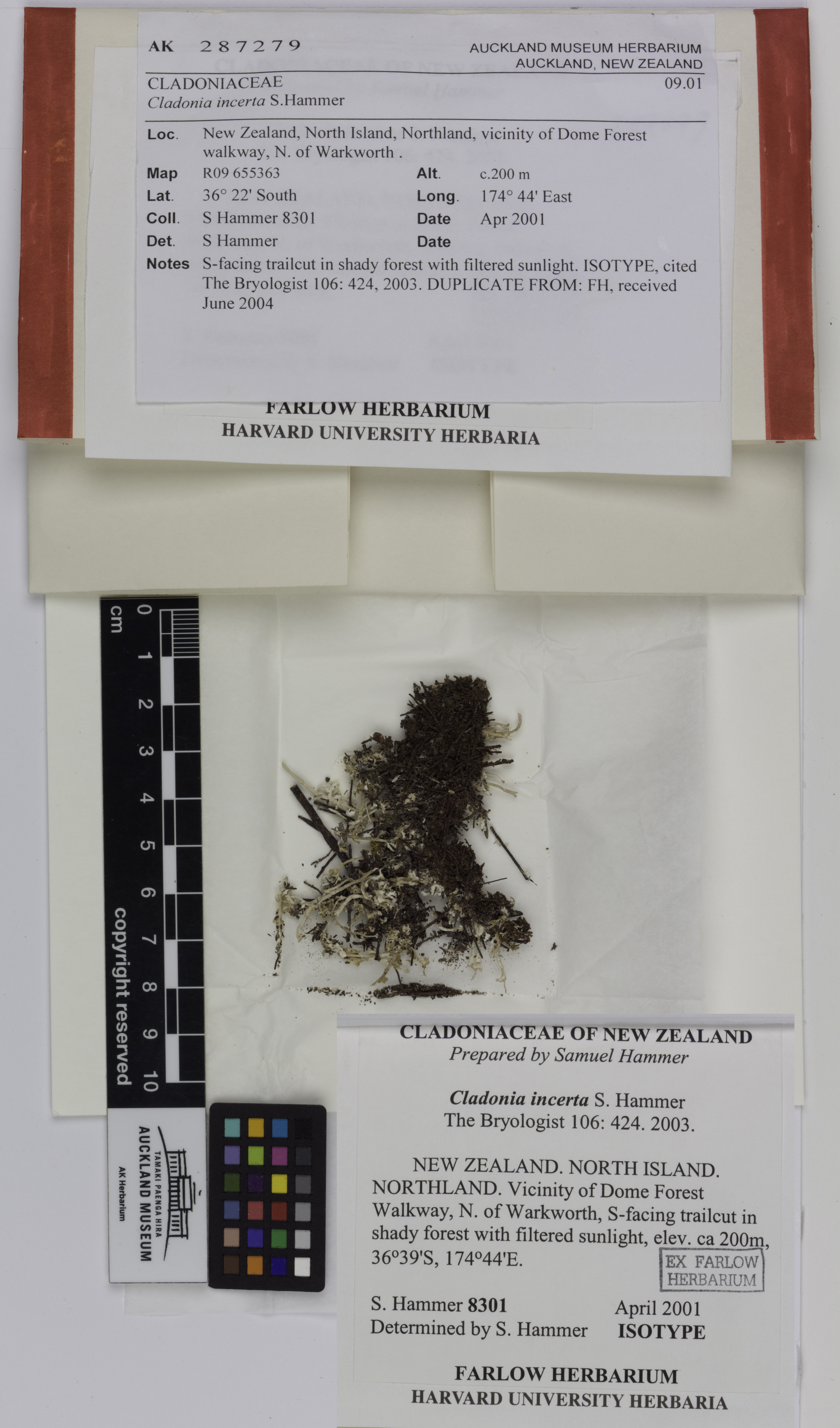
- Herbarium specimen of Cladonia incerta

Scientific classification
- Kingdom: Fungi
- Division: Ascomycota
- Class: Lecanoromycetes
- Order: Lecanorales
- Family: Cladoniaceae
- Genus: Cladonia
- Species: C. incerta

Binomial name
- Cladonia incerta S.Hammer (2003)
- Holotype: Dome Forest walkway, New Zealand

= Cladonia incerta =

Species of lichen

Cladonia incerta is a species of fruticose lichen in the family Cladoniaceae. Found in New Zealand, it was formally described as a new species in 2003 by the lichenologist Samuel Hammer. He collected the type specimen near the Dome Forest walkway north of Warkworth. The species epithet incertain refers to the uncertain ontogeny (development) of the podetia, which take various forms.

The primary thallus of Cladonia incerta is squamulose (scaly) and can be either persistent or evanescent. The squamules are elongated, somewhat incised, and can be sorediate or esorediate, and erect. The podetia are tubular or flattened, elongated and sinuous, branched, subulate or scyphose, decumbent, and can be esorediate, farinose-sorediate, granular, or verruculose. They contain fumarprotocetraric acid.

== See also ==
- List of Cladonia species
