= Doug Armstrong (broadcaster) =

New Zealand broadcaster

Doug Armstrong QSO JP

2nd Mayor of Rodney District
- In office 1992–2000
- Preceded by: Gordon Mason
- Succeeded by: John Law

Personal details
- Born: Douglas Warwick Armstrong; 13 April 1931 Wellington, New Zealand
- Died: 18 February 2015 (aged 83) Whanganui, New Zealand
- Cricket career

Cricket information
- Batting: Right-handed
- Bowling: Slow left-arm orthodox

Domestic team information
- Years: Team
- 1958/59: Central Districts
- FC debut: 25 December 1958 v Northern Districts
- Last FC: 1 January 1959 v Canterbury

Career statistics
Competition	First-class
Matches	2
Runs scored	9
Batting average	4.50
100s/50s	0/0
Top score	8*
Balls bowled	234
Wickets	1
Bowling average	123.00
5 wickets in innings	0
10 wickets in match	0
Best bowling	1/47
Catches/stumpings	2/–
- Source: CricketArchive, 21 April 2023

Douglas Warwick Armstrong QSO JP (13 April 1931 – 18 February 2015) was a New Zealand cricketer, television sports broadcaster and local-body politician. He served as mayor of Rodney District from 1992 to 2000.

== Cricket career ==
Born in Wellington in 1931, Armstrong was a slow left-arm orthodox bowler and tail-end batsman. He played two first-class matches for Central Districts in the 1958–59 season, and also appeared for Manawatu and Wanganui in four Hawke Cup matches between 1956 and 1964.

== Broadcasting career ==
Armstrong was a sports presenter on TVNZ in the 1980s. He worked alongside Phillip Leishman and Peter Williams at the first Rugby World Cup in 1987.

== Political career ==
In 1988, Armstrong was elected to the Auckland Regional Authority for the Albany ward. He was elected mayor of Rodney District in 1992, succeeding Sir Gordon Mason. He was re-elected at the local-body elections in 1995 and 1998, but council in-fighting led to his resignation in 2000.

In the 1998 Queen's Birthday Honours, Armstrong was appointed a Companion of the Queen's Service Order for public services. He died in Whanganui in 2015.
