= Penny Webster =

New Zealand politician

Penny Webster is a former mayor of Rodney District and a councillor on the Auckland Council. As mayor of Rodney she headed one of the six main local government entities generally considered as making up the Auckland metropolitan area (Auckland City, Manukau City, Waitakere City, North Shore City, Papakura District, Rodney District), with her district being the northernmost entity. All of these entities were merged into the new Auckland Council in 2010. She was also a former New Zealand politician: an MP from 1999 to 2002, representing the ACT New Zealand party.

Before entering politics, Webster was a farmer, and headed the Auckland branch of the Federated Farmers organisation.

== Member of Parliament ==
New Zealand Parliament
Years	Term	Electorate	List	Party
1999–2002	46th	List	8	ACT

She was first elected to Parliament in the 1999 election, becoming a list MP.

In the 2002 election, however, she was ranked in thirteenth place, a low position for a sitting MP. Owen Jennings, another former farmer, was also ranked lowly, prompting some to suggest that ACT was not as interested in the rural vote as it might once have been.

ACT did not win sufficient votes for thirteen seats, and so Webster did not return to Parliament.

== Local government ==
Auckland Council
Years	Ward	Affiliation
2010–13	Rodney	Independent
2013–16	Rodney	Independent

In 2007 Webster was elected Mayor of Rodney District. In December 2008 she was unanimously elected as the chair of the Auckland Mayoral Forum.

In December 2008 she was also appointed by Environment Minister Nick Smith to sit on a technical advisory board on reforms to the Resource Management Act.

In 2010 Webster was elected to the inaugural Auckland Council, representing the Rodney Ward. She served as the Chairperson of the Strategy and Finance Committee.

Webster was re-elected in 2013. At the 2016 elections, Webster was defeated by Greg Sayers.
