= Gordon Mason =

New Zealand rugby union player

Sir Gordon Mason OBE JP
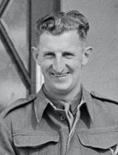
- Mason in 1944

1st Mayor of Rodney District
- In office 1989–1992
- Succeeded by: Doug Armstrong

18th Chairman of Rodney County
- In office 1973–1989
- Preceded by: John James Granville
- Succeeded by: Office abolished

Personal details
- Born: Gordon Charles Mason; 8 November 1921 Helensville, New Zealand
- Died: 20 July 2010 (aged 88) Red Beach, New Zealand
- Spouse: Tui King (m. 1944)
- Children: 3

Sir Gordon Charles Mason OBE JP (8 November 1921 – 20 July 2010) was a New Zealand local-body politician and businessman. He served as the mayor of Rodney District from 1989 to 1992.

== Biography ==
Born in Helensville on 8 November 1921, Mason was the son of Joseph Henry Mason and May Louisa Mason (née Parker). In 1944, he married Tui Audrey King, and the couple had three children. They lived at Kaipara Flats, where they ran a transport business and later farmed.

Mason entered local-body politics in 1960, when he was elected a member of the Rodney County Council. He served as deputy chair of the county council for 10 years from 1963, and then was chair between 1973 and 1989. When Rodney District was created by the amalgamation of Helensville Borough and Rodney County in the 1989 local government reforms, Mason was elected the district's first mayor, before retiring from public life three years later.

Mason served as president of the New Zealand Counties Association between 1984 and 1987, and was intimately involved in the marger of that body with the Municipal Association in 1988 to form the Local Government Association (LGA). In 1994, he was made a life member of the LGA. He was also a justice of the peace.

Mason died at the Hibiscus Coast Hospice in Red Beach on 20 July 2010, and was buried at Kaipara Flats Cemetery. His wife, Tui, Lady Mason, died in Warkworth on 10 February 2022.

== Honours and awards ==
In 1977, Mason was awarded the Queen Elizabeth II Silver Jubilee Medal. In the 1982 Queen's Birthday Honours, he was appointed an Officer of the Order of the British Empire, for services to local government. In the 1993 New Year Honours, he was made a Knight Bachelor, also for services to local government.
