= Tāwharanui Regional Park =

Regional park in New Zealand

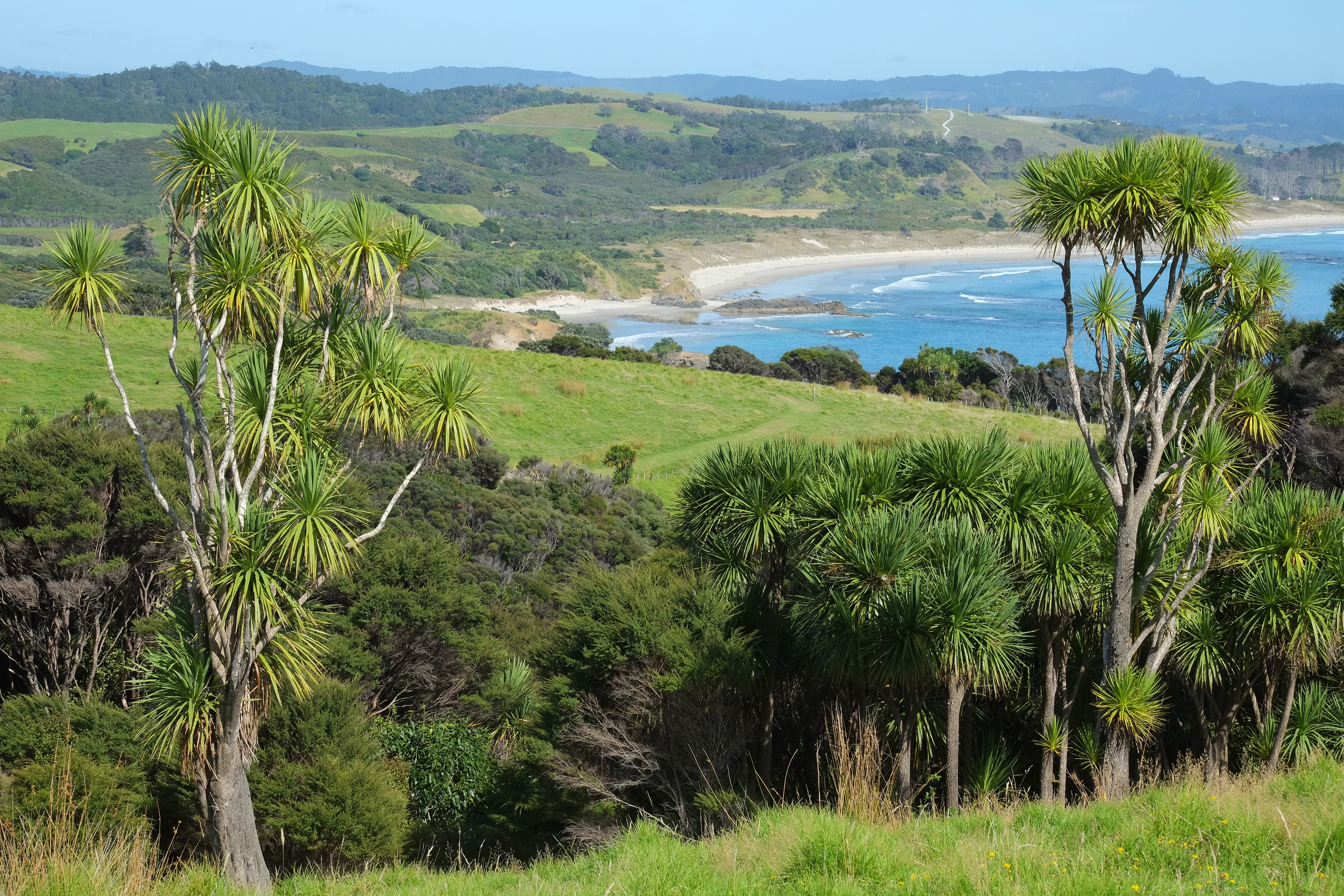
- Tāwharanui Regional Park

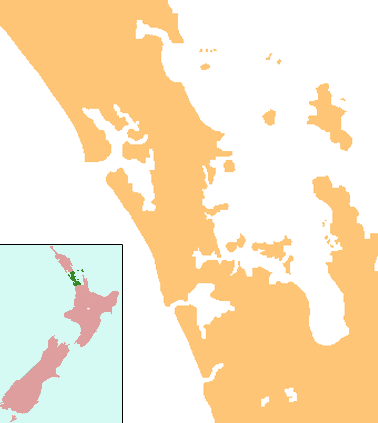
- Location within New Zealand Auckland
- Location: Rodney, Auckland, New Zealand
- Coordinates: 36.3721894°S 174.8269492°E
- Area: 593.8 hectares (1,467 acres)
- Operator: Auckland Council

Tāwharanui Regional Park is a regional park on the Tāwharanui Peninsula in the Auckland Region of New Zealand's North Island. It is located in Rodney, east of Warkworth and north of Auckland.

== Geography ==
The park covers 593.8 hectares of land at the end of the peninsula, and is owned and managed by Auckland Council. The park combines a "mainland island" sanctuary for the conservation of native plants and animals with farmland and public recreation areas. The park is mostly grazed pasture with mānuka scattered throughout and patches of coastal forest. The most significant area of coastal forest is in the central eastern part of the park where kauri and rimu dominate the ridges, with pūriri, taraire, tawa and, less often, rewarewa and nīkau in the valleys. Elsewhere there are tōtara, kahikatea, pōhutukawa, cabbage trees, karaka and New Zealand flax.

A predator-proof fence was constructed in the park, making the peninsula a haven for native bird species. Sixteen species of native land birds and 15 species of native coastal birds have been recorded in the park. Wetland birds include the Australasian bittern, spotless crake and fernbird. Coastal birds include the New Zealand dotterel, blue reef heron and variable oystercatcher.

== History ==
The peninsula was traditionally settled by Tāmaki Māori tribes. Until the 1870s, the area was settled by Ngāti Tahuhu and Kawerau peoples. Two traditional pā sites are located within the park: one in the headlands above Jones Bay, and one to the north at Anchor Bay. The name Tāwharanui refers to the edible flower bracts of the kiekie vine, and suggests the area was known for its abundance of the plant.

In the 1870s, the area was purchased from its traditional owners, and developed into a farm by the Martin, Jones and Young families. The kauri trees on the peninsula were milled during the early occupation, and slate was mined in the park. The remnants of the mine flooded, creating the Jones Bay lagoon.

The regional park was created from land purchased from the Goergetti family in 1973. The mainland island was created by the construction of a 2.5 km pest-proof fence across the peninsula in 2004. An aerial drop of poison later in 2004 which eliminated black rats, brown rats, feral cats, possums, weasels, stoats and ferrets. However, some introduced pests, like mice, rabbits and hedgehogs, remain in the sanctuary.

The Tāwharanui Open Sanctuary Society assists Auckland Council with the sanctuary by fundraising and volunteer work.
