= William Henry Feldon =

English sculptor

William Henry Feldon (1871–1945) was an English sculptor active in New Zealand. Feldon studied at Oxford University and worked for Farmer & Brindley in London before travelling to the United States for work. Feldon started his own practice in Sussex and later moved to New Zealand. Most of Feldon's later work were memorials for soldiers of the First World War.

== Early life ==
William Henry Feldon was born 16 June 1871 in Oxford, England. Feldon studied at Oxford University at Exeter College.

== Career ==
=== England ===
Feldon took an apprenticeship under H.J. Arnott in 1884 until he moved to London in 1889 to work for Farmer & Brindley. During his employment with Farmer & Brindley Feldon travelled to Albany, New York before returning to London in 1894. In the late 1890s Feldon moved to Sussex and started his own sculpting practice. Whilst in Sussex Feldon worked on a number of commissions, did military service and was Master of Eastbourne College. Feldon moved back to Oxford before immigrating to New Zealand in 1910 with his wife and children.

=== New Zealand ===
Feldon lived in Wellington and one of his first works was carving and modelling the panels for the Government House. Feldon moved to Auckland and worked on the carvings for numerous buildings, especially on Queen Street, notably the Auckland Town Hall, Auckland Ferry Building, St Paul's Church, Symonds Street. Feldon's military service saw him serve as brigade major in the Auckland Mounted Rifles and quartermaster domestically during the First World War. Following the end of the war Feldon moved to Victoria Street, Auckland and offered his services for crafting war memorials to mayors and county chairmen across the country. Despite a belief that craftsmen from Europe should create these memorials Feldon managed to secure contracts for several war memorials such as a statute of Edith Cavell for the Auckland Children's Hospital, a statute of King George V for the Matakana War Memorial, the Bombay Domain Memorial Gates, the Arawa Memorial in Rotorua, and the Papakura-Karaka Memorial. Feldon continued to work as a sculptor until c.1939. Feldon preferred to work with New Zealand materials such as Oamaru stone; Feldon believed New Zealand granite was superior to other granite, stating that the weight and colours were better.

== Kemp Monument ==
In 1911, Feldon was hired to sculpt a monument of Major Kemp. This turned out to be quite a controversial work due to the liquidation of the firm that was contracted for the monument and a refusal to pay from Kemp's sister due to her belief the statue did not resemble her father's likeness. The case went to court the judge ruled against Kemp's sister; however, this judgement was set aside and Justice Chapman ruled in favour of Kemp's sister. This decision was appealed and a new trial was granted.

== Personal life ==
In 1894, after returning to London, Feldon married. Feldon was a Freemason. In 1945 Feldon died, he was buried in Purewa Cemetery alongside his wife.

== Works ==
Name	Date	Image	Note	Ref
Government House, Wellington	1910		Worked on panels for the residence	
Auckland Town Hall	1911			
Kemp Monument	1911		Feldon sculpted the head and body but not the limbs and base. Registered as a category 1 monument with Heritage New Zealand and Category A with the Whanganui District Council.	
Auckland Ferry Building	1912			
St Paul's Church, Symonds Street	c.1911			
Bust of Richard Seddon	1911		Created for the Seddon Memorial Technical College	
Statute of Edith Cavell in the Auckland children's hospital	1918			
Matakana War Memorial	1919		Registered as a category 2 structure with Heritage New Zealand and scheduled with Auckland Council as category B	
Bombay Domain Memorial Gates	1919		Scheduled with Auckland Council	
Arawa memorial	1919			
Papakura-Karaka War Memorial	1920		Feldon's work was the lion statue at the base, and he supervised the other work. In 1932 Feldon was hired by the Papakura Town Board to assess the condition of the memorial and carry out remediation if required. Scheduled with Auckland Council as category B.	
Pokeno War Memorial	1921		Scheduled with Waikato District Council as category B	
Helensville War Memorial	1921		Scheduled with Auckland Council as category B	
St Matthew-in-the-City War Memorial	1921			
Mercer War Memorial	1922		Registered as a category 1 structure with Heritage New Zealand and scheduled with the Waikato District Council as category B	
Hikurangi Bridge War Memorial	1922		Destroyed in 1925	
Otahuhu War Memorial	1927		Feldon did some work on the bronze statue, but it came from London. Scheduled with Auckland Council as category A and registered as a category 1 structure by Heritage New Zealand	
Lord Jellicoe Cenotaph Reserve, Invercargill	1928			
In memoriam pioneer women, Garden of Memories, Howick	1939	A white stone statue of an adult woman wearing a long, elegant dress. She holds a bouquet that has been painted blue.	Statue erected in honour of pioneer women in Emilia Maud Nixon's Garden of Memories, Uxbridge Road, Howick	
