= Dome Forest =

Forest in Auckland Region, New Zealand

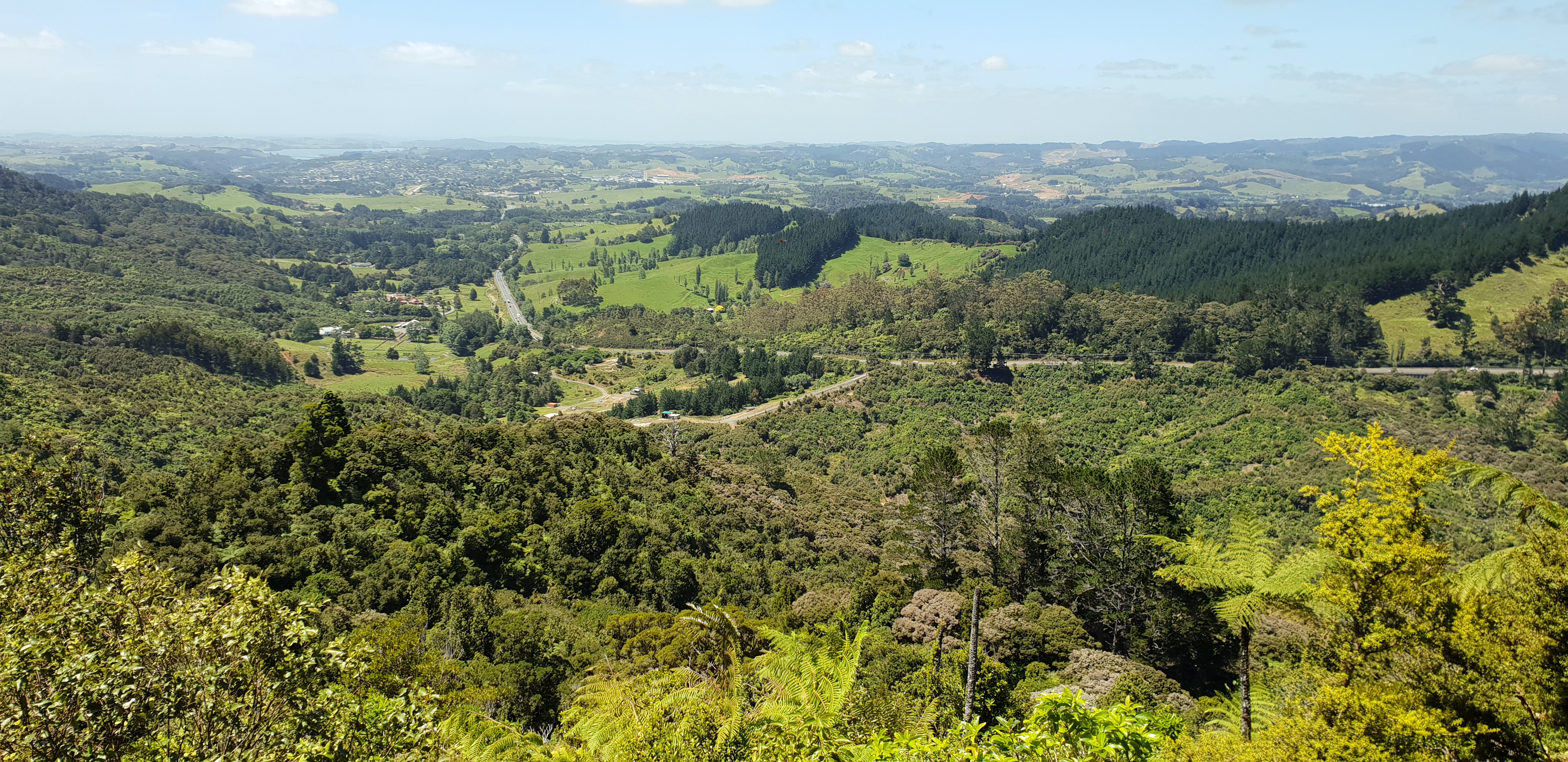
- A view of the Dome Valley from the Dome Forest Walkway
- Interactive map of Dome Forest
- Coordinates: 36°21′47″S 174°37′12″E

Dome Forest is a mix of commercial and protected native forest in Rodney in the Auckland Region of New Zealand.

== Geography ==
The forest is an area seven kilometres north-west of the township of Warkworth. A forested area above the Dome Valley, the Dome Forest is dominated by a ridge, the highest point being the 336-metre tall peak known as the Dome. The Te Araroa Trail follows the ridgeline of the forest. The land is formed from erosion-resistant Waitemata sandstone.

The native forest areas is dominated by podocarp and broadleaf species. Some areas feature much older forest of mature rimu, tōtara, miro, kawaka and northern rātā, and notably the Waiwhiu Kauri Grove, an area featuring 20 large kauri trees. Species of Carmichaelia, the New Zealand broom, can be commonly found in the forest.

== History ==
The traditional name for the Dome (the peak in the forest) was Tohitohi o Rei, a name referencing the ancestress Reipae of the Tainui migratory waka. Tohitohi o Rei is a location mentioned in a traditional story of Reitū and Reipae. Reipae travelled around the North Island with her sister Reitū on the back of a large bird, rested at the peak.

The forest is primarily owned by the Crown and managed by the Department of Conservation, and includes both commercial forest and areas of regenerating native forest.
