= John Law (New Zealand politician) =

Former New Zealand mayor

John Law is a former Mayor of the Rodney District Council, New Zealand, and held that post from 2001 to 2007. He was elected during a by-election, following a period of instability in the leadership and governance of Rodney District Council. He was one of the seven mayors heading the main local government entities generally considered as making up the Auckland metropolitan area (Auckland City, Manukau City, Waitakere City, North Shore City, Rodney District Franklin District Council Papakura District Council), with his district being one of the largest districts and the northernmost entity. John Law was re-elected in 2004, but did not stand for re-election in 2007.

John Law was the first Mayor to declare his district "organic friendly". He was also one of the proponents of greater regional integration between the various districts. He was at one time the Chair of the Mayoral forum of Auckland. John Law was against the Super-City, and his plan was for the ARC to be abolished and replaced with a council of the seven Mayors to lead regional issues with one of the Mayors elected as chair. John Law was cautiously critical of the proposed outcomes of the Super-City and unsupportive of the drive to merge district councils. He later acknowledged the Super-City to be an 'abject failure'.

John Law has also questioned the decision making of the ARC in other ways, such as when he expressed his opinion that the Regional Council should not have a say in land use (zoning) and should stick to dealing with environmental concerns.

In 2022, his grandson Jake Law stood as a candidate in the 2022 local body elections to be a councillor in the Albany Ward (which makes up part of the former Rodney area) and for the Hibiscus and Bays Local Board. Jake was elected to the Hibiscus and Bays Local Board in October 2022. Auckland Council.
