= Matakana River =

River in the Auckland Region, New Zealand

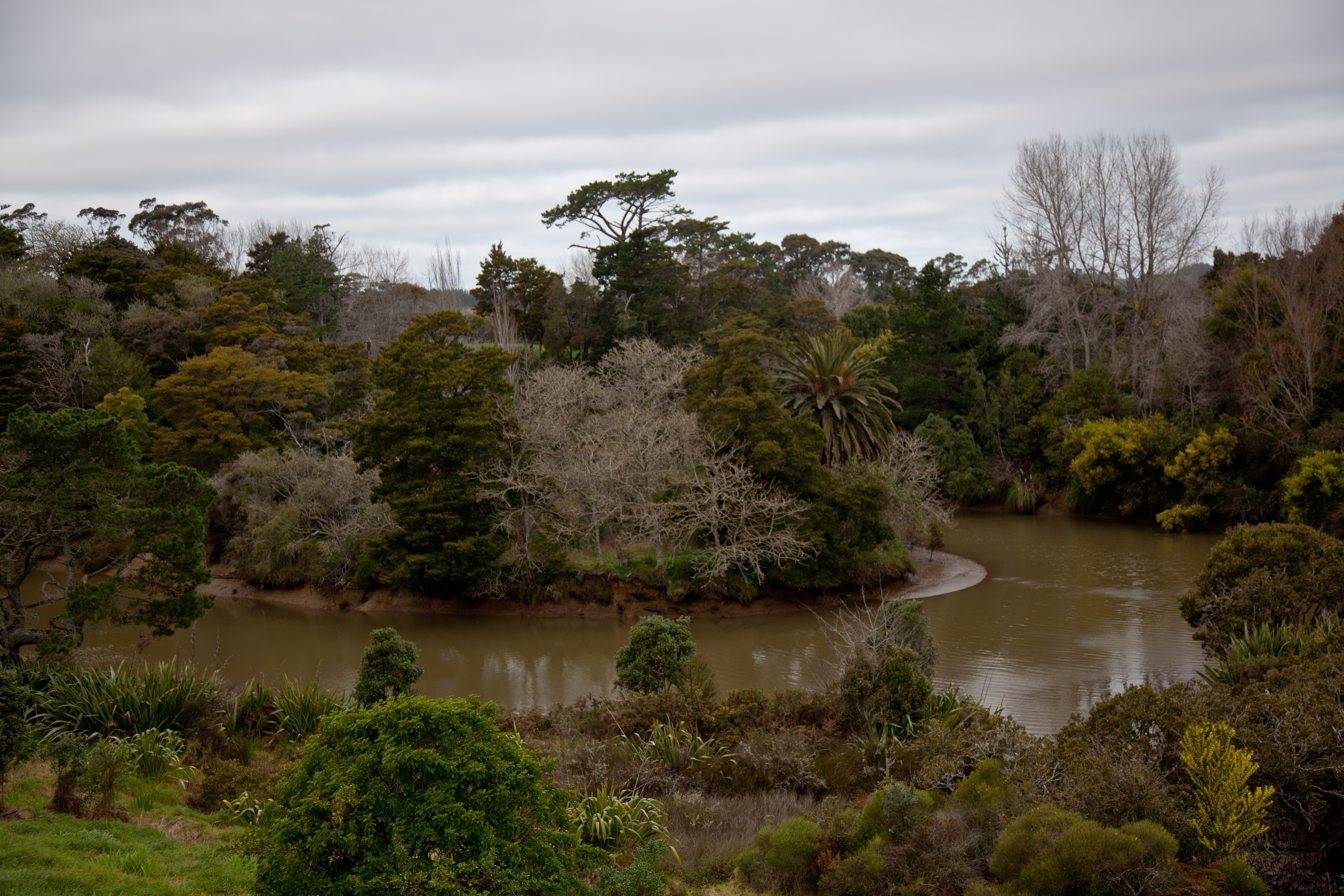
- Matakana River at Matakana township

- Mouth of the Matakana River Matakana River (New Zealand)
- Route of the Matakana River

Location
- Country: New Zealand
- Region: Auckland Region
- Ward: Rodney

Physical characteristics
- Source: Tamahunga
  - coordinates: 36.3009°S 174.7129°E
- Mouth: Kawau Bay
  - coordinates: 36.39889°S 174.740717°E

Basin features
- Progression: Matakana River → Kawau Bay → Hauraki Gulf
- Tributaries
  - right: Glen Eden River

Matakana River is in the Auckland Region of New Zealand's North Island. It flows south from its origins on the slopes of Tamahunga, Conical Peak and Pukematakeo, north of the township of Matakana, passing through the township and flowing into its estuary, which opens into Kawau Bay, facing Kawau Island.

The Matakana River hosts the annual Matakana Seagull Race, a boat race where the power is provided by British Seagull outboard motors.

== See also ==
- List of rivers of New Zealand
