= Sandspit, New Zealand =

Sandspit
- Suburb
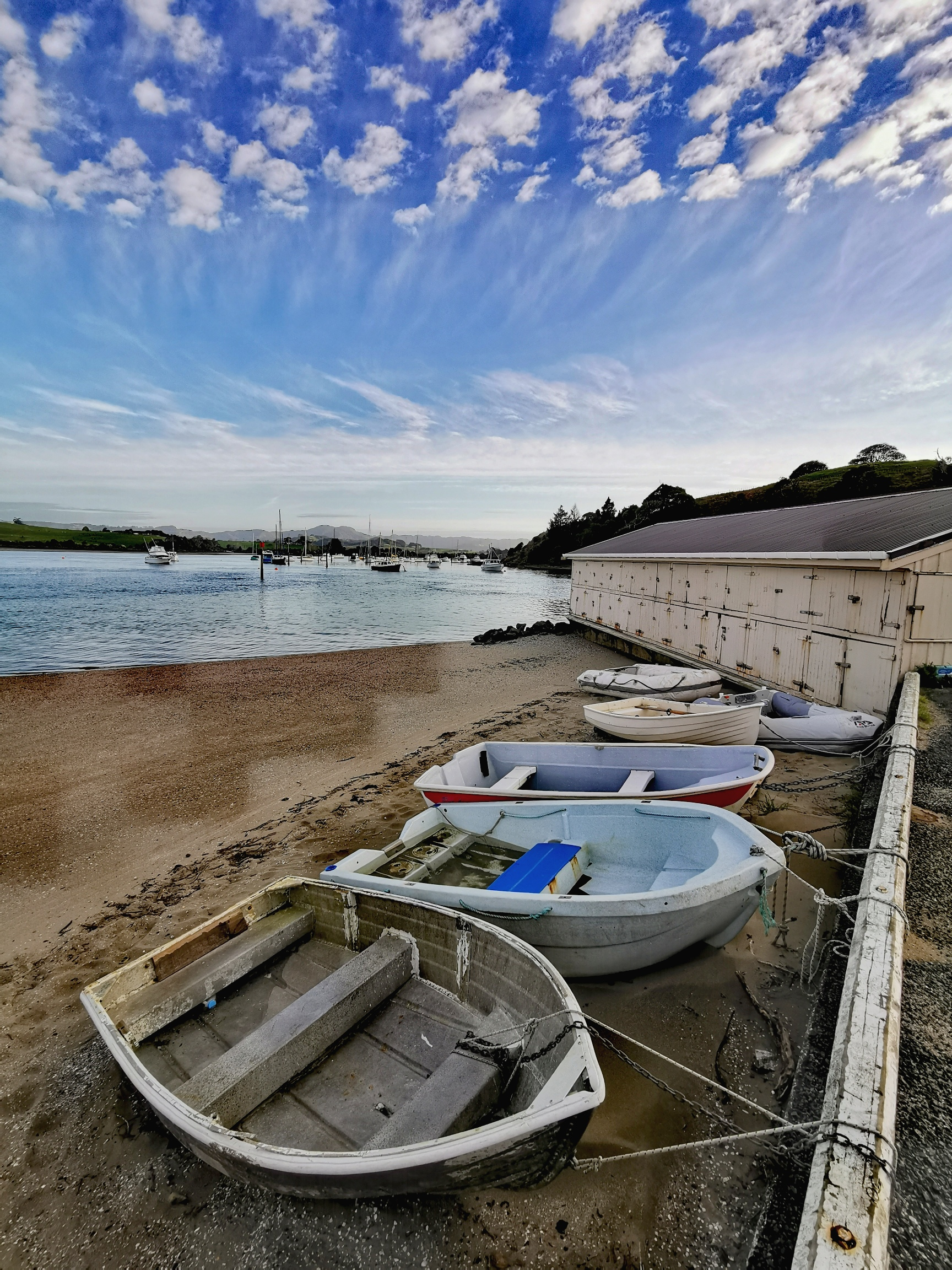
- Boats at the end of the spit
- Interactive map of Sandspit
- Coordinates: 36.393°S 174.728°E
- Country: New Zealand
- City: Auckland
- Local authority: Auckland Council
- Electoral ward: Rodney ward
- Local board: Rodney Local Board
- Board subdivision: Warkworth

Area
  - Land: 346 ha (850 acres)

Population (June 2025)
  - Total: 510
  - Density: 150/km^{2} (380/sq mi)
- Postcode: 0982

Wellsford	Matakana	Ōmaha
Warkworth	Sandspit	(Kawau Island)
Puhoi	Snells Beach

Sandspit is a settlement in the Auckland Region of New Zealand. It is on the Mahurangi Peninsula, about 65 kilometres north of the city centre. It has experienced substantial increases in property values during the first two decades of the 21st century.

Ferries run several times a day from Sandspit to Kawau Island. Ferry service between Sandspit and Kawau first started in 1934, with a boat which was (possibly later) called Nancibel[l]. In the 1950s, Nancibel was replaced by Mairie and Kawau Isle.

Brick Bay, which is adjacent to Sandspit, has a sculpture trail along a two-kilometre path through native bush, fields and ponds.

== Demographics ==
Statistics New Zealand describes Sandspit as a rural settlement, which covers 3.46 km^{2} (1.34 sq mi) and had an estimated population of 510 as of June 2025, with a population density of 147 people per km^{2}. Sandspit settlement is part of the larger Sandspit statistical area.

Historical populations for the settlement
Year	Pop.	±% p.a.
2006	429	—
2013	486	+1.80%
2018	528	+1.67%
2023	522	−0.23%

Sandspit settlement had a population of 522 in the 2023 New Zealand census, a decrease of 6 people (−1.1%) since the 2018 census, and an increase of 36 people (7.4%) since the 2013 census. There were 255 males and 264 females in 225 dwellings. 2.9% of people identified as LGBTIQ+. The median age was 61.4 years (compared with 38.1 years nationally). There were 51 people (9.8%) aged under 15 years, 33 (6.3%) aged 15 to 29, 213 (40.8%) aged 30 to 64, and 225 (43.1%) aged 65 or older.

People could identify as more than one ethnicity. The results were 94.8% European (Pākehā); 5.2% Māori; 1.7% Pasifika; 1.7% Asian; 0.6% Middle Eastern, Latin American and African New Zealanders (MELAA); and 3.4% other, which includes people giving their ethnicity as "New Zealander". English was spoken by 98.9%, Māori language by 1.1%, and other languages by 9.2%. No language could be spoken by 0.6% (e.g. too young to talk). The percentage of people born overseas was 30.5, compared with 28.8% nationally.

Religious affiliations were 31.6% Christian, 0.6% Hindu, and 0.6% other religions. People who answered that they had no religion were 58.6%, and 8.6% of people did not answer the census question.

Of those at least 15 years old, 111 (23.6%) people had a bachelor's or higher degree, 246 (52.2%) had a post-high school certificate or diploma, and 78 (16.6%) people exclusively held high school qualifications. The median income was $42,100, compared with $41,500 nationally. 78 people (16.6%) earned over $100,000 compared to 12.1% nationally. The employment status of those at least 15 was that 168 (35.7%) people were employed full-time, 84 (17.8%) were part-time, and 3 (0.6%) were unemployed.

=== Sandspit statistical area ===
Sandspit statistical area, which includes the area between the settlement and Warkworth, covers 22.25 km^{2} (8.59 sq mi) and had an estimated population of 990 as of June 2025, with a population density of 44 people per km^{2}.

Historical population
Year	Pop.	±% p.a.
2006	801	—
2013	879	+1.34%
2018	969	+1.97%
2023	990	+0.43%

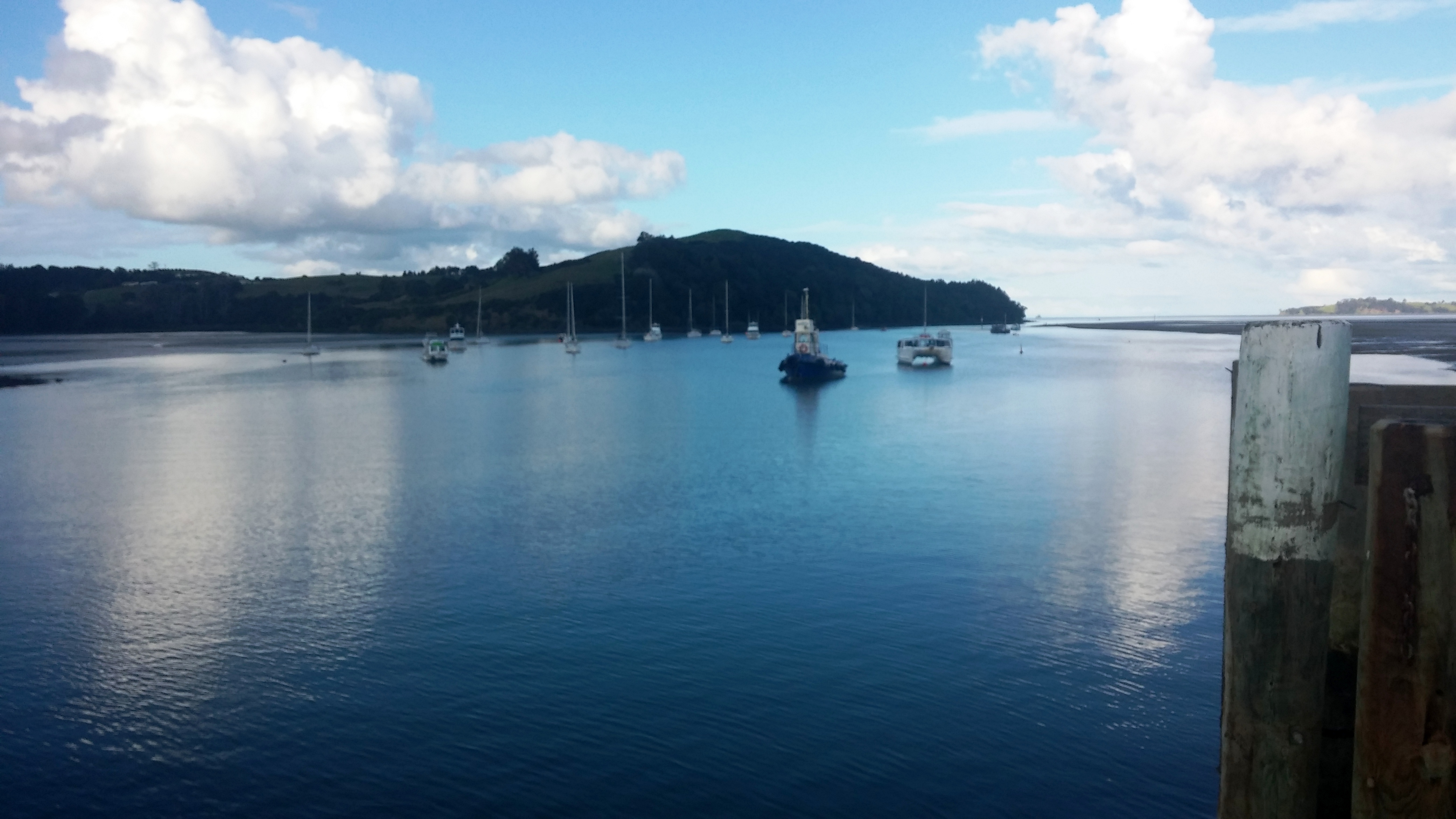
View of Kawau Bay from Sandspit

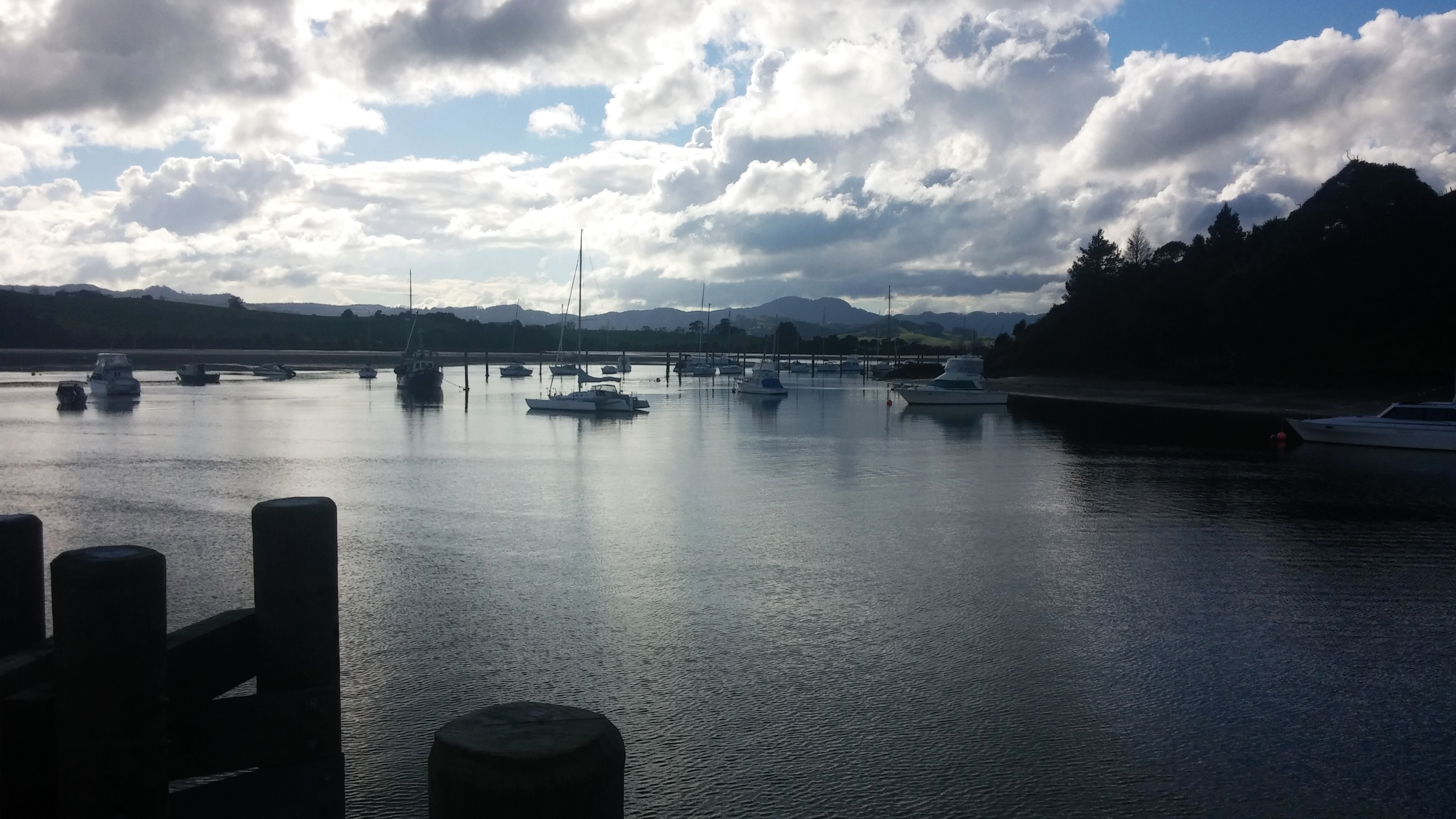
View of Kawau Bay from Sandspit Wharf

Sandspit statistical area had a population of 990 in the 2023 New Zealand census, an increase of 21 people (2.2%) since the 2018 census, and an increase of 111 people (12.6%) since the 2013 census. There were 480 males and 507 females in 387 dwellings. 2.4% of people identified as LGBTIQ+. The median age was 57.0 years (compared with 38.1 years nationally). There were 135 people (13.6%) aged under 15 years, 96 (9.7%) aged 15 to 29, 414 (41.8%) aged 30 to 64, and 342 (34.5%) aged 65 or older.

People could identify as more than one ethnicity. The results were 94.5% European (Pākehā); 5.8% Māori; 2.4% Pasifika; 2.1% Asian; 0.6% Middle Eastern, Latin American and African New Zealanders (MELAA); and 4.2% other, which includes people giving their ethnicity as "New Zealander". English was spoken by 98.2%, Māori language by 0.6%, Samoan by 0.3%, and other languages by 10.0%. No language could be spoken by 0.9% (e.g. too young to talk). The percentage of people born overseas was 28.5, compared with 28.8% nationally.

Religious affiliations were 32.1% Christian, 0.3% Hindu, 0.3% Jewish, and 0.3% other religions. People who answered that they had no religion were 58.2%, and 8.2% of people did not answer the census question.

Of those at least 15 years old, 201 (23.5%) people had a bachelor's or higher degree, 441 (51.6%) had a post-high school certificate or diploma, and 156 (18.2%) people exclusively held high school qualifications. The median income was $43,600, compared with $41,500 nationally. 144 people (16.8%) earned over $100,000 compared to 12.1% nationally. The employment status of those at least 15 was that 339 (39.6%) people were employed full-time, 150 (17.5%) were part-time, and 9 (1.1%) were unemployed.
