= Rodney District =

- Former local government area
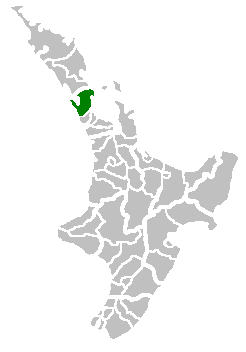

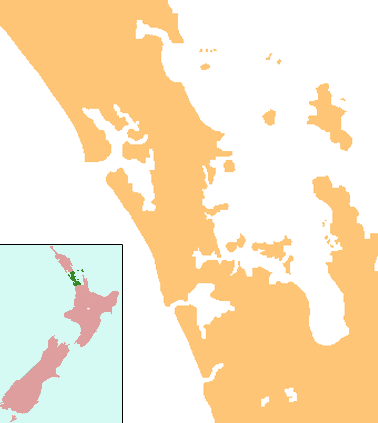
- Location within New Zealand Auckland
- Coordinates: 36.539°S 174.528°E
- Country: New Zealand
- Island: North Island
- Region: Auckland Region

Area
  - Land: 2,427.01 km^{2} (937.07 sq mi)
- Extent: Muriwai to Hibiscus Coast; south to Helensville

Rodney District was a local government area in the northernmost part of New Zealand's Auckland Region from 1989 to 2010. It included Kawau Island. It was created from the amalgamation of Helensville Borough and Rodney County in 1989. The seat of Rodney District Council was at Orewa. Rodney District and Rodney County each took their names from Cape Rodney (opposite Little Barrier Island), which Captain James Cook named on 24 November 1769 after Admiral Sir George Brydges Rodney.

Auckland Council has governed the area since 1 November 2010. The Rodney ward of the Auckland Region now covers much of the land area, but not the Hibiscus Coast or the former council seat of Orewa, which are in the Albany ward.

The district was, in the final electoral term (2007–2010) of its existence, led by mayor Penny Webster and 12 councillors.

== Mayors ==
During its 21-year existence, Rodney District had four mayors:

	Name	Term
1	Gordon Mason	1989–1992
2	Doug Armstrong	1992–2000
3	John Law	2001–2007
4	Penny Webster	2007–2010

== See also ==
- Territorial authorities of New Zealand
