= Matakana =

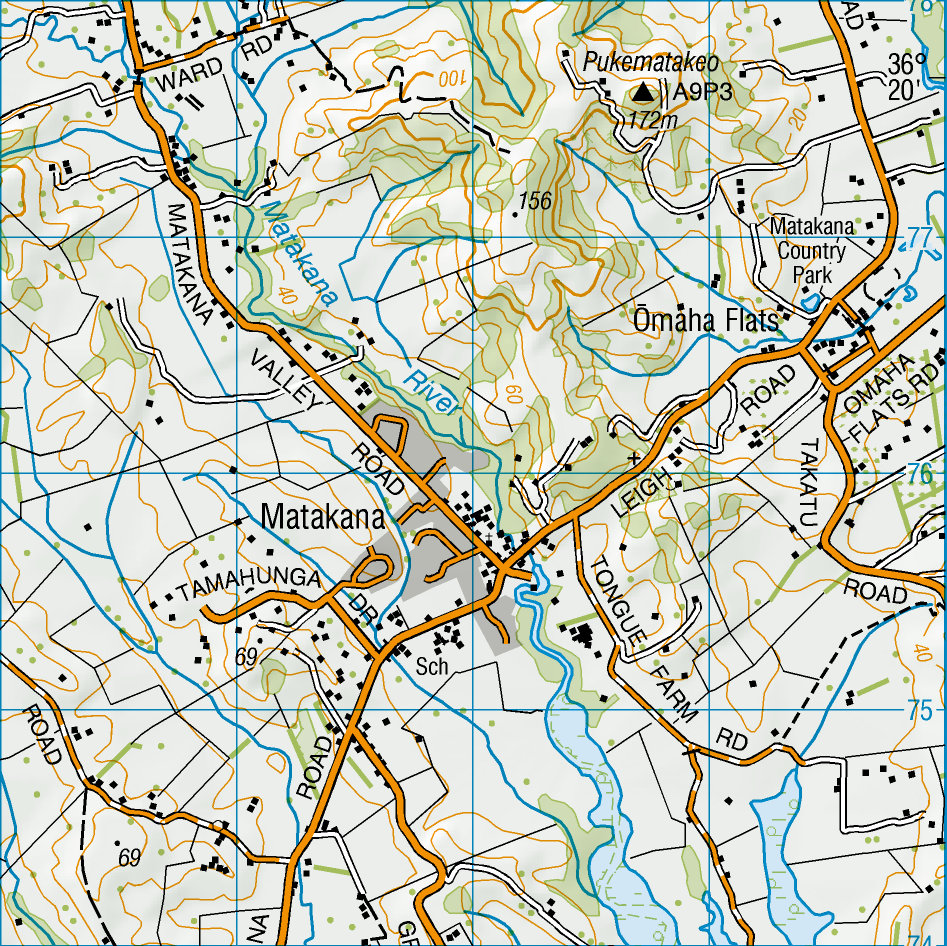
- Coordinates: 36°21′6″S 174°43′0″E
- Country: New Zealand
- Region: Auckland Region
- Ward: Rodney ward
- Local board: Rodney Local Board
- Subdivision: Warkworth subdivision
- Electorates: Kaipara ki Mahurangi; Te Tai Tokerau

Government
  - Territorial Authority: Auckland Council
  - Mayor of Auckland: Wayne Brown
  - Kaipara ki Mahurangi MP: Chris Penk
  - Te Tai Tokerau MP: Mariameno Kapa-Kingi

Area
  - Total: 1.60 km^{2} (0.62 sq mi)

Population (June 2025)
  - Total: 650
  - Density: 410/km^{2} (1,100/sq mi)

Matakana is a town in the Mahurangi region of the North Island of New Zealand. Matakana is north of Warkworth. The Matakana River flows through the town and into Kawau Bay to the south-east.

European settlers came to the area during the 1840s and 1850s primarily to log kauri and Matakana developed from this presence, growing into a small village by the 1880s. Matakana relied primarily on river transport until 1930.

== History ==
The area of Matakana was part of the Mahurangi Purchase in 1841, leading to the first European settlers arriving. 5 years later the government started to issue pastoral and timber licences for the Matakana area. A timber mill at Matakana was established in 1851 by John Long Heydin. Settlers arrived in greater numbers the finalisation of the Omaha and Mahurangi purchases in 1853. Matakana developed as a settlement in the 1850s following the later wave of settlers, with the town initially being known as Upper Matakana to distinguish it from Lower Matakana (now known as Sandspit). The first school in the town opened in 1862. In 1868 a post office and shop was established and in 1875 a library was opened. By 1881 Matakana had all the expected facilities of a village

The early settlers primarily milled kauri from the 1840s to the 1880s, when most of it had been logged and horticulture took over as the main economic activity. Shark fishing was an activity during the early 20th-century with a factory for processing sharks for oil and fertiliser in the area. In 1925 the factory closed.

The Matakana River served as the primary means of transport for the settlement with the town developing around a wharf constructed in 1879. Roads were established in the late 1870s and 1880s but the river remained the main method of transportation until 1930.

=== First World War Memorial ===
Following the end of the Great War the local community fundraised to establish a war memorial for the local servicemen who died in the conflict. William Henry Feldon was commissioned to design the memorial and it was completed December 1919. It was officially unveiled 23 April 1920 by Joseph Gordon Coates, Minister for Defence and Public Works. The statue and land was donated to the Rodney County Council to form the Matakana Wharf Reserve. In 2006 the statue was relocated roughly 50 m (160 ft) to make room for a roundabout and public toilets. The statue is registered as category 2 with Heritage New Zealand.

== Governance ==
The Matakana West Road District was formed 26 September 1867 and the Matakana East Road District was formed 19 March 1868. The two road districts merged into one from 1868 to 1872, when they separated. The Matakana East Road District was abolished c.1916–1921 and the Matakana West Road District was abolished c.1911–1916.

== Matakana Diamond Jubilee Park ==
Matakana Diamond Jubilee Park opened in 1897. Between approximately 1870 to 1897, horse races were held on New Year’s Day and Easter Monday on a track in Matakana township. The meetings also included athletics. This area is now the Diamond Jubilee Park, which opened to celebrate Queen Victoria’s 60 years on the throne.

== Notable buildings ==
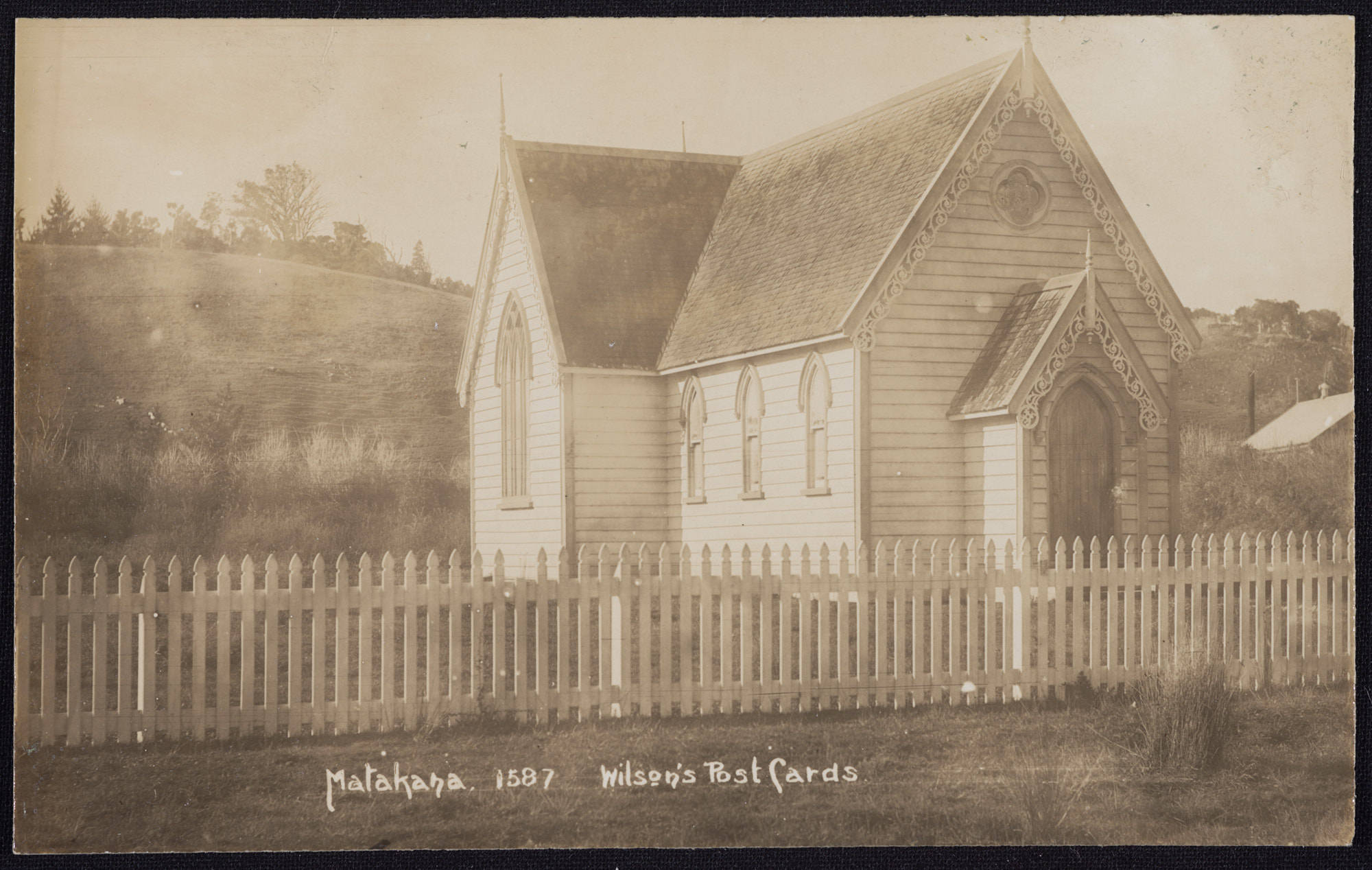
St Andrew's Church c.1910

- St Andrew's Church is a former Presbyterian church. Constructed in 1892 as a single-storeyed wooden building it was relocated from Matakana to the Matakana Country Park and is registered as a category 2 building with Heritage New Zealand.
- St Leonard's Church is the Anglican church for Matakana and the wider area. It was constructed in 1914 in the Gothic revival style following a donation of land from William Jackson. An earlier Anglican church may have been constructed in 1894. The building is registered as a category 2 building with Heritage New Zealand.

== Demographics ==
Matakana had a population of c.150 in 1881.

Statistics New Zealand describes Matakana as a rural settlement, which covers 1.60 km^{2} (0.62 sq mi) and had an estimated population of 650 as of June 2025, with a population density of 406 people per km^{2}. Matakana is part of the larger Dome Valley-Matakana statistical area.

Historical population for Matakana
Year	Pop.	±% p.a.
2006	267	—
2013	318	+2.53%
2018	492	+9.12%
2023	570	+2.99%

Matakana had a population of 570 in the 2023 New Zealand census, an increase of 78 people (15.9%) since the 2018 census, and an increase of 252 people (79.2%) since the 2013 census. There were 270 males and 300 females in 225 dwellings. 2.1% of people identified as LGBTIQ+. The median age was 48.3 years (compared with 38.1 years nationally). There were 117 people (20.5%) aged under 15 years, 48 (8.4%) aged 15 to 29, 255 (44.7%) aged 30 to 64, and 150 (26.3%) aged 65 or older.

People could identify as more than one ethnicity. The results were 92.1% European (Pākehā); 7.9% Māori; 2.6% Pasifika; 4.2% Asian; 0.5% Middle Eastern, Latin American and African New Zealanders (MELAA); and 1.1% other, which includes people giving their ethnicity as "New Zealander". English was spoken by 97.9%, Māori language by 1.1%, Samoan by 1.1%, and other languages by 8.9%. No language could be spoken by 1.1% (e.g. too young to talk). New Zealand Sign Language was known by 0.5%. The percentage of people born overseas was 24.2, compared with 28.8% nationally.

Religious affiliations were 30.0% Christian, 1.6% Hindu, 0.5% Islam, 0.5% Buddhist, 1.1% New Age, 0.5% Jewish, and 1.1% other religions. People who answered that they had no religion were 59.5%, and 6.3% of people did not answer the census question.

Of those at least 15 years old, 114 (25.2%) people had a bachelor's or higher degree, 234 (51.7%) had a post-high school certificate or diploma, and 69 (15.2%) people exclusively held high school qualifications. The median income was $48,200, compared with $41,500 nationally. 81 people (17.9%) earned over $100,000 compared to 12.1% nationally. The employment status of those at least 15 was that 201 (44.4%) people were employed full-time, 87 (19.2%) were part-time, and 9 (2.0%) were unemployed.

=== Dome Valley-Matakana statistical area ===
Dome Valley-Matakana statistical area, which includes Dome Valley and Rainbows End, covers 84.76 km^{2} (32.73 sq mi) and had an estimated population of 1,720 as of June 2025, with a population density of 20 people per km^{2}.

Historical population for Dome Valley-Matakana
Year	Pop.	±% p.a.
2006	1,122	—
2013	1,284	+1.95%
2018	1,530	+3.57%
2023	1,641	+1.41%

Dome Valley-Matakana had a population of 1,641 in the 2023 New Zealand census, an increase of 111 people (7.3%) since the 2018 census, and an increase of 357 people (27.8%) since the 2013 census. There were 819 males, 822 females and 3 people of other genders in 603 dwellings. 2.7% of people identified as LGBTIQ+. The median age was 47.4 years (compared with 38.1 years nationally). There were 300 people (18.3%) aged under 15 years, 204 (12.4%) aged 15 to 29, 765 (46.6%) aged 30 to 64, and 372 (22.7%) aged 65 or older.

People could identify as more than one ethnicity. The results were 92.5% European (Pākehā); 10.4% Māori; 2.4% Pasifika; 4.2% Asian; 0.9% Middle Eastern, Latin American and African New Zealanders (MELAA); and 1.8% other, which includes people giving their ethnicity as "New Zealander". English was spoken by 98.0%, Māori language by 2.4%, Samoan by 0.4%, and other languages by 10.2%. No language could be spoken by 1.5% (e.g. too young to talk). New Zealand Sign Language was known by 0.2%. The percentage of people born overseas was 23.8, compared with 28.8% nationally.

Religious affiliations were 26.1% Christian, 0.5% Hindu, 0.4% Islam, 0.7% Māori religious beliefs, 0.4% Buddhist, 0.7% New Age, 0.2% Jewish, and 0.9% other religions. People who answered that they had no religion were 63.8%, and 6.8% of people did not answer the census question.

Of those at least 15 years old, 327 (24.4%) people had a bachelor's or higher degree, 663 (49.4%) had a post-high school certificate or diploma, and 252 (18.8%) people exclusively held high school qualifications. The median income was $42,700, compared with $41,500 nationally. 228 people (17.0%) earned over $100,000 compared to 12.1% nationally. The employment status of those at least 15 was that 609 (45.4%) people were employed full-time, 279 (20.8%) were part-time, and 33 (2.5%) were unemployed.

== Climate ==
Climate data for Matakana (1951–1980)
Month	Jan	Feb	Mar	Apr	May	Jun	Jul	Aug	Sep	Oct	Nov	Dec	Year
Mean daily maximum °C (°F)	23.6 (74.5)	23.6 (74.5)	22.0 (71.6)	20.1 (68.2)	17.3 (63.1)	15.4 (59.7)	14.2 (57.6)	14.9 (58.8)	16.4 (61.5)	18.2 (64.8)	19.8 (67.6)	21.5 (70.7)	18.9 (66.1)
Daily mean °C (°F)	19.5 (67.1)	19.8 (67.6)	18.7 (65.7)	16.7 (62.1)	14.2 (57.6)	12.5 (54.5)	11.2 (52.2)	11.9 (53.4)	12.9 (55.2)	14.5 (58.1)	16.0 (60.8)	17.6 (63.7)	15.5 (59.8)
Mean daily minimum °C (°F)	15.3 (59.5)	16.0 (60.8)	15.3 (59.5)	13.2 (55.8)	11.1 (52.0)	9.5 (49.1)	8.1 (46.6)	8.8 (47.8)	9.4 (48.9)	10.7 (51.3)	12.1 (53.8)	13.7 (56.7)	11.9 (53.5)
Average rainfall mm (inches)	69 (2.7)	113 (4.4)	103 (4.1)	121 (4.8)	144 (5.7)	155 (6.1)	141 (5.6)	164 (6.5)	119 (4.7)	103 (4.1)	102 (4.0)	95 (3.7)	1,429 (56.4)
Source: NIWA

== Education ==
The first school in Matakana opened 27 January 1862. The building also served as a Presbyterian church until the construction of a dedicated church building in 1892.

Matakana School is a coeducational contributing primary (years 1–6) school with a roll of 350 students as of July 2026. The school was established in 1862.

== Events ==
Matakana hosts many varied events throughout the year. The Matakana Farmers' Market is held every Saturday.

== Related links ==
- Matakana Village retail development website
- Matakana War Memorial
- Matakana Cemetery
- 1:50,000 map
- 1942 one inch map
