= Rodney ward =

- Ward of Auckland
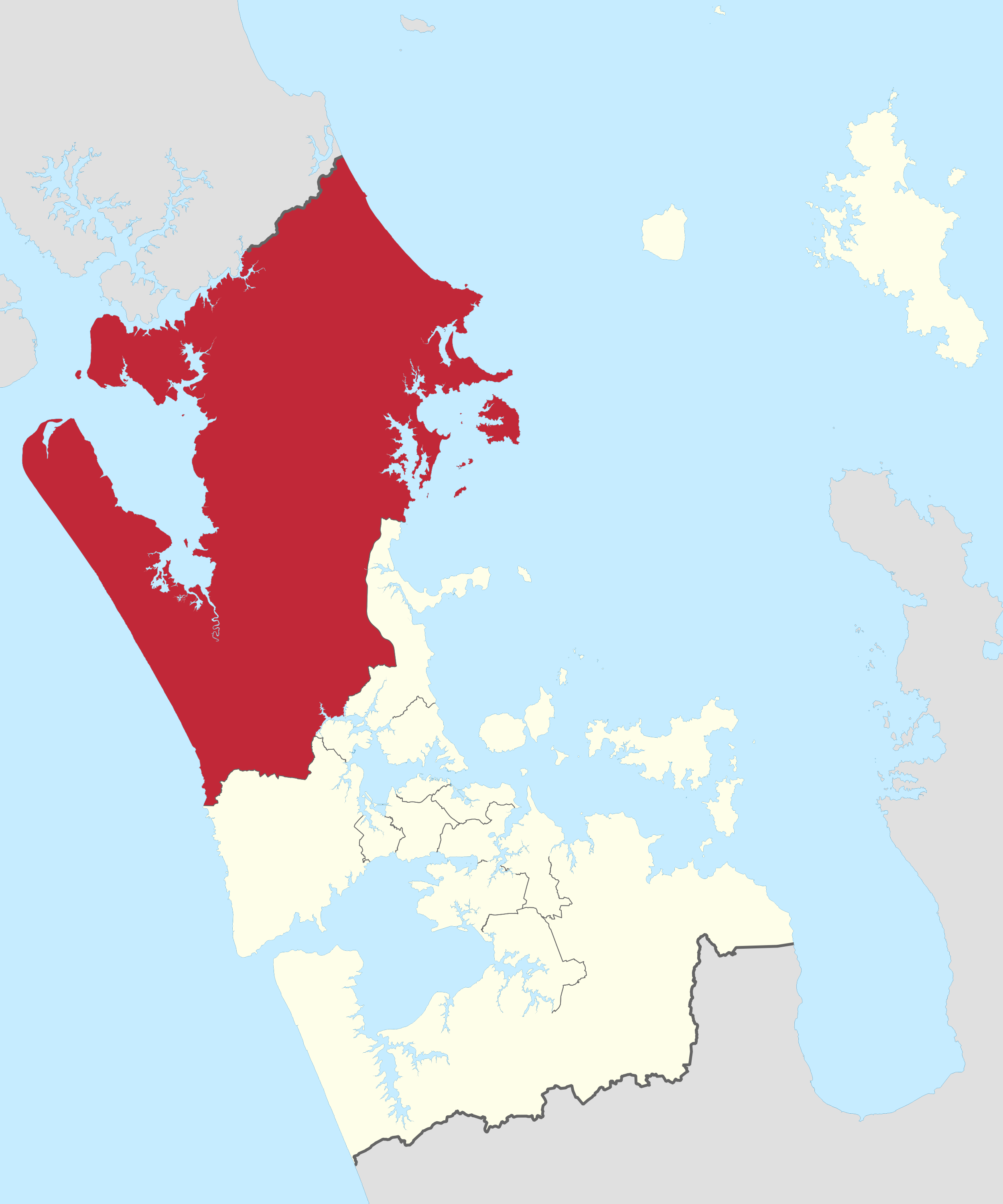
- Country: New Zealand
- Island: North Island
- Region: Auckland Region

Area
  - Land: 2,275.00 km^{2} (878.38 sq mi)

Population (June 2025)
  - Total: 83,400
  - Density: 36.7/km^{2} (94.9/sq mi)
- Extent: Muriwai Beach to the Kowhai Coast; Helensville and Kumeū to Wellsford and Kawau Island

The Rodney ward is an electoral ward of Auckland Council The area primarily covers the former Rodney District; it does not include the Hibiscus Coast, which was also part of Rodney District but is now in Albany ward. The Rodney Local Board area has the same boundaries as Rodney Ward.

== Location ==
Rodney stretches from the spectacular black volcanic sand beaches of Muriwai in the west to the white sands and islands of the Kowhai Coast in the east. It includes a number of regional parks or areas of special interest. North of Orewa are the coastal Wenderholm, Mahurangi and Tawharanui Regional Parks. Cape Rodney-Okakari Point Marine Reserve, which surrounds Te Hāwere-a-Maki / Goat Island, was New Zealand's first marine reserve, officially opened in 1977. It covers a coastline of about 5 km (3 mi), extends out in sea by 800 m, and encompasses 5 km^{2} (2 sq mi), inside which all marine life is protected.

== Population ==
Rodney ward covers 2,275.00 km^{2} (878.38 sq mi) and had an estimated population of 83,400 as of June 2025, with a population density of 37 people per km^{2}.

Historical population
Year	Pop.	±% p.a.
2006	49,359	—
2013	54,882	+1.53%
2018	66,417	+3.89%
2023	77,949	+3.25%

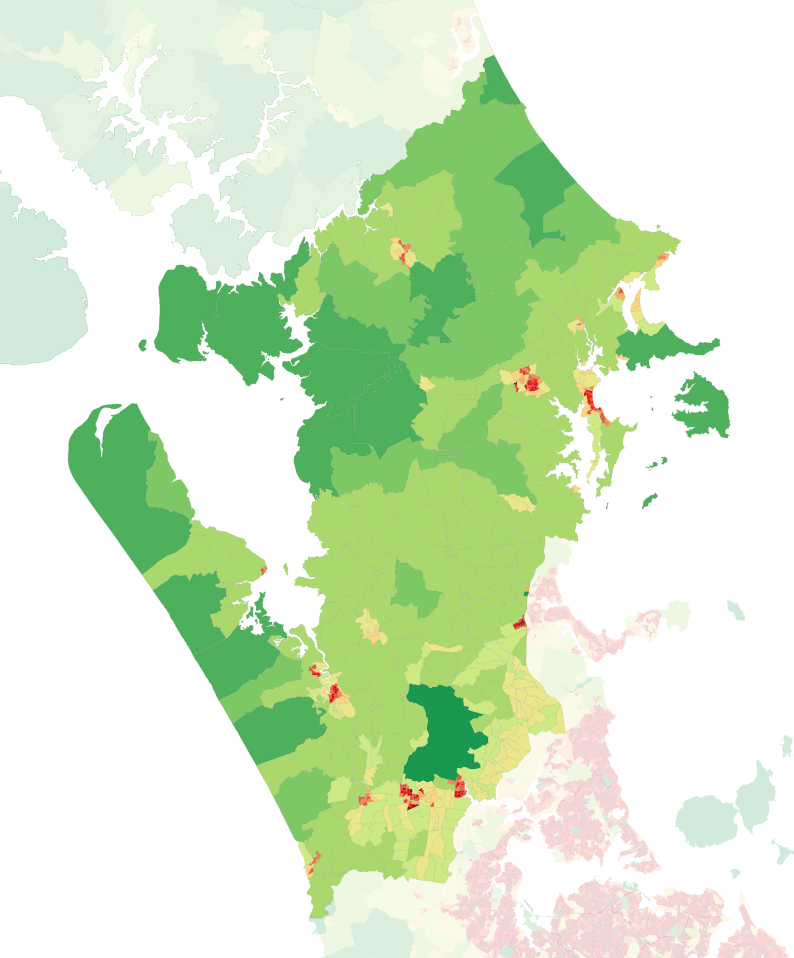
Population density in the 2023 census

Rodney ward had a population of 77,949 in the 2023 New Zealand census, an increase of 11,532 people (17.4%) since the 2018 census, and an increase of 23,067 people (42.0%) since the 2013 census. There were 38,826 males, 38,859 females and 261 people of other genders in 26,883 dwellings. 2.6% of people identified as LGBTIQ+. The median age was 41.3 years (compared with 38.1 years nationally). There were 15,225 people (19.5%) aged under 15 years, 11,988 (15.4%) aged 15 to 29, 36,972 (47.4%) aged 30 to 64, and 13,764 (17.7%) aged 65 or older.

People could identify as more than one ethnicity. The results were 84.9% European (Pākehā); 12.2% Māori; 4.3% Pasifika; 9.4% Asian; 1.2% Middle Eastern, Latin American and African New Zealanders (MELAA); and 2.7% other, which includes people giving their ethnicity as "New Zealander". English was spoken by 96.5%, Māori language by 1.8%, Samoan by 0.4%, and other languages by 12.8%. No language could be spoken by 2.1% (e.g. too young to talk). New Zealand Sign Language was known by 0.3%. The percentage of people born overseas was 26.4, compared with 28.8% nationally.

Religious affiliations were 28.2% Christian, 1.5% Hindu, 0.5% Islam, 0.7% Māori religious beliefs, 0.7% Buddhist, 0.5% New Age, 0.1% Jewish, and 1.4% other religions. People who answered that they had no religion were 59.5%, and 7.2% of people did not answer the census question.

Of those at least 15 years old, 15,705 (25.0%) people had a bachelor's or higher degree, 33,453 (53.3%) had a post-high school certificate or diploma, and 13,569 (21.6%) people exclusively held high school qualifications. The median income was $45,600, compared with $41,500 nationally. 10,539 people (16.8%) earned over $100,000 compared to 12.1% nationally. The employment status of those at least 15 was that 32,595 (52.0%) people were employed full-time, 9,711 (15.5%) were part-time, and 1,272 (2.0%) were unemployed.

== Governance ==
Rodney ward councillors of Auckland
- Incumbent; Greg Sayers
- Term length: Three years
- Inaugural holder: Penny Webster
- Formation: 1 November 2010
- Website: www.aucklandcouncil.govt.nz

The Rodney ward is one of the 13 wards of Auckland Council and is governed by the Mayor of Auckland. It has one directly elected councillor who sits on the Auckland Council. The councillor has oversight over Rodney Local Board.

Election	Councillor elected	Affiliation	Votes	Notes
2010	Penny Webster	Independent	8645	
2013	Penny Webster	Independent	8587	
2016	Greg Sayers	Independent	9252	
2019	Greg Sayers	Independent	-	Re-elected unopposed
2022	Greg Sayers	Independent	13539	
2025	Greg Sayers	Independent	elected unopposed	

== Election results ==
Election results for the Rodney ward:

=== 2025 election results ===
Rodney ward
Affiliation	Candidate	Votes
Independent	Greg Sayers^{†}	Unopposed
Registered		56,644
Independent hold		
^{†} incumbent

=== 2022 election results ===
	Name	Affiliation	Votes
1	Greg Sayers	Independent	13539
	Beth Houlbrooke	Rodney First	5850
	Rob Ryan	Independent	1447
	Anne Perratt	Independent	1109
	Hannah North		1048
Blank			824
Informal			18

=== 2016 election results ===
	Name	Affiliation	Votes	%
1	Greg Sayers	Independent	9,252	47.1%
	Penny Webster	Independent	6,073	30.9%
	Steven Garner	Independent	1,898	9.7%
	Holly Southernwood		1,342	6.8%
Blank			1,061	5.4%
Informal			22	0.1%
Turnout			19,648	
