= Omaha, New Zealand =

Omaha or Ōmaha is a name applied to various features in the Mahurangi region of New Zealand.

== Designated areas ==
- Omaha Ecological Area, part of the Ōmaha Forest and covering Mount Tamahunga
- Ōmaha Scenic Reserve, scenic reserve at the foothills of Mount Tamahunga
- Ōmaha Tāniko Wetlands Scientific Reserve, scientific reserve adjacent to Omaha Beach
- Omaha Road District, area governed by the Omaha Road Board, name used for a wider area and was used for local sports clubs

== Settlements ==
- Big Ōmaha, locality between Matakana and Leigh
- Leigh, formerly known as Little Omaha
- Ōmaha, also called Ōmaha Beach, developed in the 1970s. Originally known as just Mangatawhiri (as part of the larger area known as Mangatawhiri)
- Ōmaha Flats, a rural locality east of Matakana

== Natural features ==
- Little Omaha Bay, small bay by the Omaha sandspit
- Omaha Bay, large bay in the Hauraki Gulf, also known as Big Omaha Bay to distinguish it from Little Omaha Bay
- Ōmaha Beach, beach in Little Omaha Bay
- Omaha Cove, cove near Leigh
- Ōmaha Forest, forest in the hinterland of the Mahurangi region
- Ōmaha River, river that flows from Pukematakeo into the Whangateau Harbour
