= Battle of Rangiriri =

1863 battle between British and Kingitanga forces

- Part of New Zealand Wars
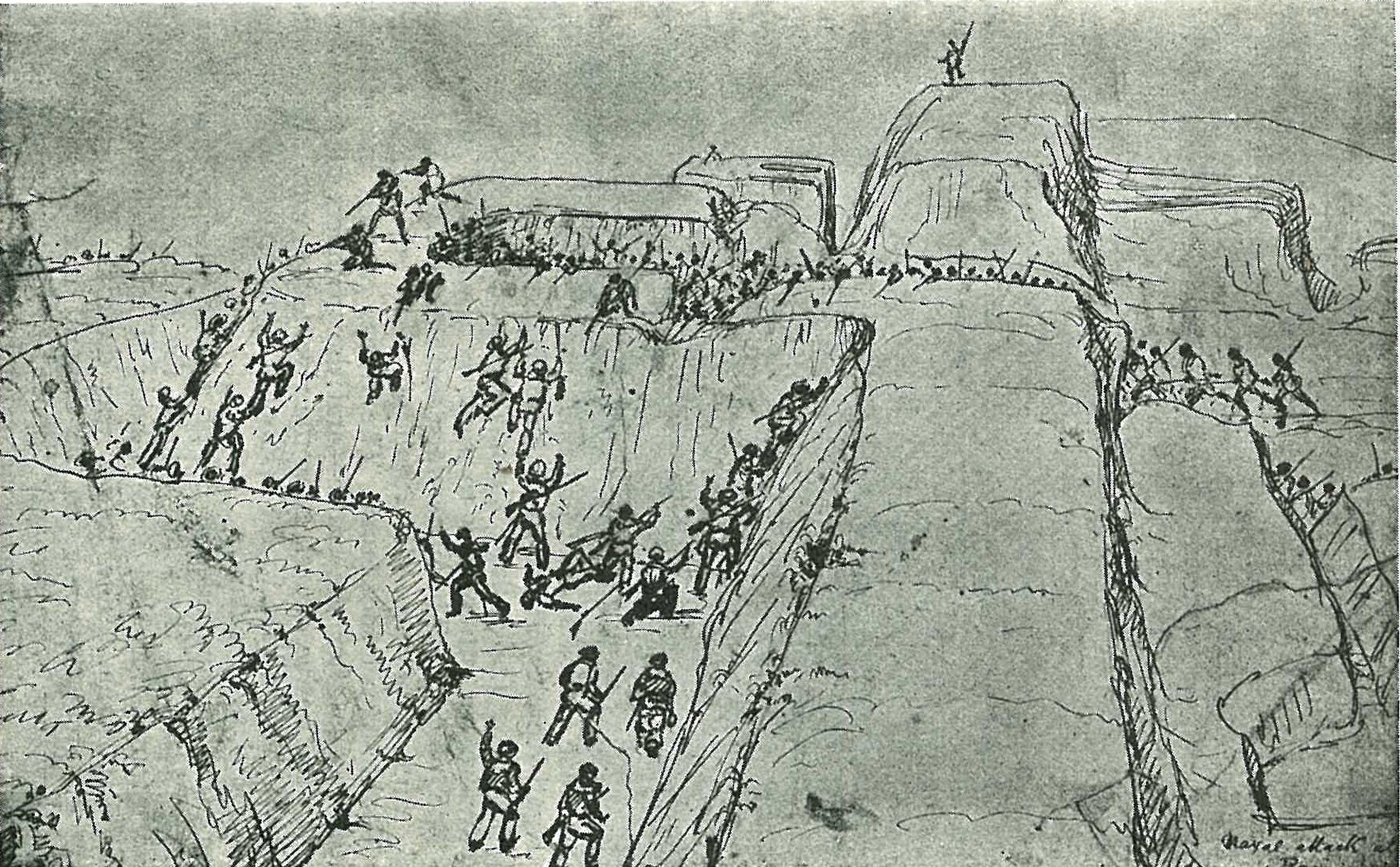
Date	20–21 November 1863
Location	Rangiriri, Waikato 37°26′00″S 175°06′00″E
Result	British victory

Belligerents
British and New Zealand colonial forces	Māori King Movement of Waikato

Strength
1,420 British regulars 3 cannons 2 gunboats	500 warriors

Casualties and losses
49 killed, 87 wounded	36 killed, 35 wounded, 183 taken prisoner

The Battle of Rangiriri was a major engagement in the invasion of Waikato, which took place on 20–21 November 1863 during the New Zealand Wars. More than 1,400 British troops defeated about 500 warriors of the Kingitanga (Māori King Movement), which was resisting the expansion of British settlement and colonial rule in the North Island. The battle cost both sides more than any other engagement of the land wars and also resulted in the capture of 180 Māori prisoners, further reducing the Kingitanga ability to oppose the far larger British force.

The British success at Rangiriri and several subsequent battles opened the Waikato basin to the British forces and the government subsequently confiscated 1.3 million hectares (3,200,000 acres) of land for use by settlers. In 1995 the Crown apologised for its actions.

== The Rangiriri defences ==
Since early August 1863 Kingitanga forces had been fighting the British advance into Waikato territory from the so-called Meremere line, a 22-kilometre (14 mi)-long line of fortifications that spread from Pukekawa to Meremere and Paparata. The defensive line commanded about 2,000 square kilometres (770 sq mi) of bush and was manned by a force of up to 1,500. On October 31 the British commander, Lieutenant-General Duncan Cameron, landed troops on the banks of the Waikato River 15 km (9.3 mi) south of Meremere, ready to make an assault on the main fortification from the rear with a total force of 1,200 men. The following day the Māori forces evacuated Meremere and retreated south to Rangiriri, their next defensive line.

Work on the Rangiriri line had begun before the fall of Meremere with a 500 m (1,600 ft) long double ditch dug between the Waikato River and Lake Kopuera. Strengthening work had continued during the earlier campaign based at Meremere, and concentrated work began in early November 1863 under the direction of Te Wharepu, a leading Waikato chief. The front line ran east–west, comprising a long trench, behind which was a parapet of banked-up earth and another trench. The trenches were between 2.7 and 4.2 m (8 ft 10 in and 13 ft 9 in) deep, with the parapet between 4.2 and 6.3 m (14 and 21 ft) from the base of the trench. Another line of defences ran south from the main line at right angles to it, facing the river to protect the line from any river-borne force. In the centre of the main line lay a small but well-protected north-facing redoubt with several lines of concealed rifle pits at its southern side. A second series of outlying works were located on a spur to the south and east of the main defence line. The defences consisted solely of earthworks, with no palisading, while the redoubt, whose low profile meant it escaped detection by Cameron on river-borne reconnaissance missions on 30 October and 18 November, was deceptively strong. (The eastern part of the double ditch and some of the outlying works were destroyed with the making of State Highway 1. From the central redoubt earthworks, Lake Kopuera is about 105 m (344 ft) to the east.)

== Opposing forces ==
Cameron commanded a battle force totaling more than 1,400 men. On the morning of 20 November, he left Meremere to march up the bank of the Waikato River with about 850 men to make the frontal assault. His division comprised members of the 65th Regiment (386), 14th Regiment (186), 12th Regiment (112), Royal Artillery, Royal Navy (100) and Royal Engineers (15). A second division, consisting of 320 men of the 40th Regiment under Lieutenant-Colonel Arthur Leslie with another 200 seamen and marines as a backup, were transported by barge further south with the aim of gaining possession of a ridge 500 m (1,600 ft) behind the main entrenchment and cutting off any escape. The British assault force assembled about 700 m (2,300 ft) north of Rangiriri, with three Armstrong guns, including one six-pounder and a 12-pounder. The storming party was equipped with revolvers, Enfield rifles with fixed bayonets and hand grenades. Two gunboats, the Pioneer and HMS Curacoa were positioned on the Waikato River.

The defending Māori force comprised about 500 men, mostly armed with double-barreled shotguns and muskets. They were from Ngati Mahuta and other Waikato sub-tribes including Ngatiteata, Ngatihine and Patupou, with outside support from Kawhia Ngati Mahuta, Ngati Paoa and Ngati Haua under Wiremu Tamihana and Tiriori. It appears Wiremu Tamihana was in the pā at the start of the battle but left after the major attacks. He was seen approaching Rangiriri after the surrender, with 400 Māori warriors which were en route to Rangiriri, but turned back after the Māori surrender the next day.

== The battle ==
About 3pm on 20 November Cameron ordered the start of a two-hour artillery bombardment, with additional fire coming from gunboats Curacoa and Pioneer. At 4.45pm, Leslie's division had still not landed because of strong flood currents and adverse winds but Cameron—concerned about the onset of darkness and the risk that his enemy would again escape—decided to launch his southward frontal attack. It began with two separate groups: 320 members of the 65th under Colonel Wyatt, with Royal Engineers on Cameron's right (the river side) and 290 men of the 12th and 14th under Colonel Austen extending the line to the British left.

British casualties began to mount as they stormed the Māori positions across the 600 m (2,000 ft) gap under heavy fire. Two colonels, Austen and Phelps, were both killed as the 12th and 14th headed for the centre of the 500 m-long line; they were unaware it was the location of the redoubt, its strongest section. Two officers of the 12th made a desperate attempt to climb the earthworks, but almost every man who reached the top with the aid of ladders was immediately shot down. The repulse of the assault left about 40 British dead or wounded. Members of the 65th Regiment, meanwhile, were faltering under the withering fire, taking cover before being stirred to resume their advance. They reached the trenches at the river side of the fortification, bridged them with planks and managed to penetrate the Māori line, possibly because much of the garrison had moved to the central redoubt to fend off the attack. About 30 Māori were killed and the surviving defenders abandoned the river-facing trenches and began fleeing south. Cameron ordered the remaining company of reserves to join the 65th in attacking the central redoubt from the west and south, but the 500-strong force began to come under the same heavy fire from the redoubt and adjacent works that had stopped the 12th and 14th. One group of British found themselves cut off at the rear entrance to the redoubt. "At one time," wrote historian James Belich, "four British corpses, seven wounded men and seven unhurt men were crammed into this corner. More men were killed while trying to go to their aid."

Leslie's men from the 40th Regiment, having finally landed, were by then arriving on the scene from the south and pressuring the Māori, who were withdrawing to the central redoubt. Cameron ordered a detachment of 36 Royal Artillery, armed with revolvers and swords, to storm the central redoubt, resulting in more deaths, including Captain Mercer. A second wave, this time of Royal Navy men armed with rifle and cutlass, was also cut down, and further assaults were made with hand-grenades thrown into the redoubt by seamen. The further losses lifted Cameron's casualties to about 110.

As night fell, the remaining 400 Māori defenders maintained a strong hold on the centre and eastern end of the line. The British, dispirited by the scale of losses, spent the night bivouacked on the wet ground, ready to renew the combat in the morning. During the night more hand-grenades were hurled into the redoubt and an abortive attempt was made to mine the parapet, but the soldiers continued to undermine the parapet with picks and shovels, while the defenders sang and chanted and returned occasional gunfire. More members of the garrison evacuated during the night, including chief Wiremu Tamihana and possibly King Tāwhiao.

=== Capture ===
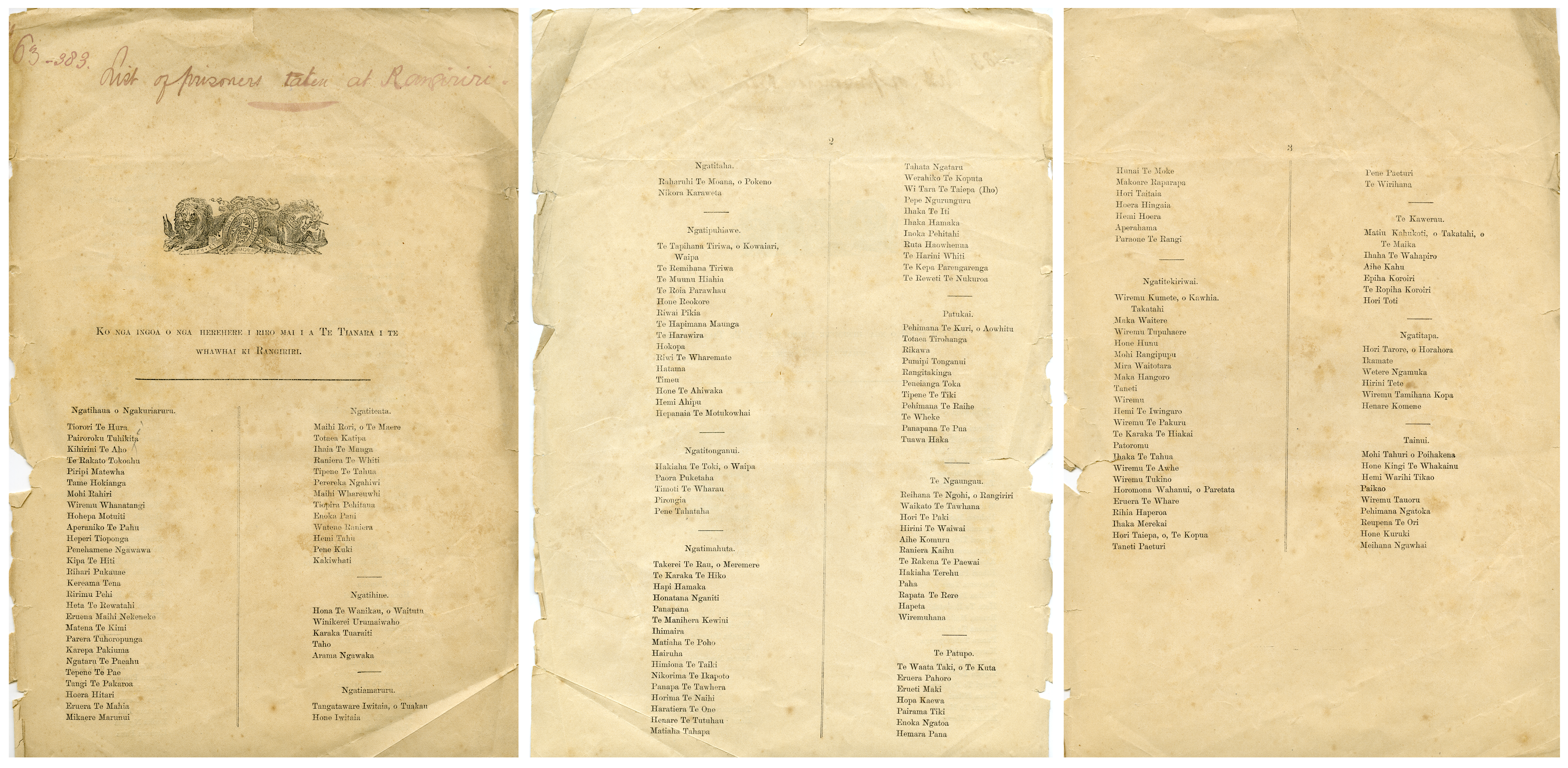
Printed list of Māori prisoners taken at Rangiriri (1863)

After being subject to intermittent grenade attacks during the night by soldiers who had stayed in the wet trenches, Māori raised a white flag over the parapet around 5 am, expecting to talk terms with Cameron. British officers entered the pā, to learn Māori wanted a truce. Instead, Cameron demanded they surrender all their arms and took almost 200 men prisoner with no resistance. They were transported by boat to the Great South Road, then marched to Auckland.

Although historian James Cowan claimed the garrison unconditionally surrendered because they had run out of ammunition, Belich says this is false; the bulk of evidence shows they still had a plentiful supply in the morning. Edmund Bohan says that Māori would have been forced to surrender within a short time and the early surrender saved lives on both sides. Major C. Heaphy, VC said Māori raised the white flag "seeing a cask of powder being brought to blow them up". Belich's conclusion is that the capture of 183 Māori at Rangiriri was a clear act of duplicity on the part of the British — "both the British and (since 1860) the Māoris were perfectly well aware that showing a white flag did not necessarily mean surrender" — yet while Cameron's action was not honourable, it was understandable. "Cameron had had eight assaults on the central redoubt bloodily repulsed, and it was not surprising that he should seize his chance rather than risk more of his men, particularly in the case of what he perceived as a 'savage' enemy."

Belich wrote: "The capture of Rangiriri was not the result of assault or encirclement, but of the British misuse of a flag of truce. The Māoris might conceivably have eventually decided to surrender unconditionally anyway, but they might also have repelled further assaults and escaped across the lake." He said they may have also been gaining time waiting for reinforcements who were almost on the scene.

About 35 of the Māori force were killed, along with six women and children. Probably an equal number of injured were evacuated by canoe across Lake Waikare. With the capture of more than 180 warriors, the battle became the costliest Māori defeat in the Waikato wars.

== Aftermath ==
The 183 prisoners were taken by boat to the Great South Road, then marched to Auckland. They were initially held on the Marion, an old coal hulk in Waitematā Harbour before being moved to the disused copper mine smelter on Kawau Island, north of Auckland. The prisoners were allowed the use of fishing boats to supplement their diet. Premier Frederick Whitaker and Colonial Secretary William Fox, meanwhile, debated bringing charges of high treason against all or some of them but disagreed on whether they should be tried by the Supreme Court or by court martial under the Suppression of Rebellion Act, a piece of legislation passed in late 1863 that authorised the Governor to arrest and detain indefinitely anyone suspected of complicity in the "rebellion". The Act provided for punishment by death, imprisonment or corporal punishment such as whipping. Dr Arini Loader, a lecturer at Victoria University of Wellington, has stated that there was a rumour at the time the ship was going to be towed out to the ocean and sunk. "They didn’t know if they were going to be lined up and shot. Neither Grey nor his ministers knew what to do with them," she said.

The prisoners were never charged nor tried by any tribunal. On the night of 11 September 1864 the 200 prisoners on Kawau seized all boats on the island and paddled to the mainland using spades, shovels and pieces of board they had fashioned into paddles. The group landed at Waikauri Bay and established a pah (Otamahua) at the summit of Mount Tamahunga overlooking Omaha and Matakana. They refused pleas by the prison keeper to return to Kawau and were eventually permitted by the government to make their way back to the Waikato. Auckland newspapers at the time reported that it had cost the vast sum of £9000 to look after the escapees and therefore no effort should be made to bring them back.

The British dead were mainly buried in a small graveyard in the Rangiriri township which is open to the public. Two Victoria Crosses were awarded after the battle: one to Assistant Surgeon William Temple for disregarding his own welfare in attending to the wounded during the assaults at the end of the day and another to Lieutenant Arthur Pickard for showing courage in running through enemy fire to reach Cameron and seek help.

Cameron attracted both praise for his "skilful measures" in the capture of Rangiriri and severe criticism over the high number of British losses. Yet the battle had highlighted the rapidly growing disparity between British and Māori forces and the inability of Waikato Māori to maintain their manpower continuously because of the need to sustain their tribal economy and attend to domestic needs. Tamehana sent his own mere to Cameron soon after the battle, and this was interpreted as a token of submission. Several Waikato chiefs including Te Wharepu expressed a willingness to negotiate and on 8 December the Kingite capital at Ngāruawāhia was abandoned and then taken by Cameron's troops. But Māori were still opposed to the British demands of submitting to the Queen and surrendering all arms and lands and began building further defences south of Ngāruawāhia.

Wiremu Te Wheoro, a chief of Ngāti Naho who was loyal to the government, was installed in a wooden redoubt constructed on a high point 500 metres (1,600 ft) east of the main earth redoubt at Rangigiri. Te Wheoro, who served as a magistrate in the Native Land Court—and about 30 of his men manned the wooden redoubt until 1868 to prevent any disruption by Kingites to the British supply line. Te Wheoro later resigned in disgust at corruption within the court and in 1879 entered Parliament as the Member for Western Maori.

== The site today ==
In 2009 the New Zealand Transport Agency, which is responsible for the Waikato Expressway Rangiriri Bypass roading project, began working in partnership with Waikato-Tainui to restore the Rangiriri Pā site. The Rangiriri Bypass and restoration works were scheduled for completion by the 150th anniversary of the Battle of Rangiriri, in November 2013 but was not complete until 2017. As part of the Rangiriri Bypass project, the Rangiriri Pā site was restored and the old State Highway 1 that cut through the pā was removed.

As part of the Rangiriri Bypass Project, the site was the subject of an archeological dig in mid-2011.

The site was returned to Waikato-Tainui by the Minister of Conservation Hon Maggie Barry on 19 August 2016 at a ceremony at Tūrangawaewae Marae during the Māori King Tuheitia 10th Coronation anniversary.

== See also ==
- Invasion of Waikato
- New Zealand Wars
- New Zealand land confiscations
- Treaty of Waitangi
- Treaty of Waitangi claims and settlements
