= Jack Dunning =

New Zealand cricketer and headmaster (1903–1971)

Jack Dunning OBE
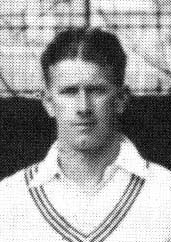

Personal information
- Full name: John Angus Dunning
- Born: 6 February 1903; Omaha, New Zealand
- Died: 24 June 1971 (aged 68); Adelaide, South Australia
- Batting: Right-handed
- Bowling: Right-arm off-break; Right-arm medium

International information
- National side: New Zealand (1933–1937)
- Test debut (cap 26): 31 March 1933 v England
- Last Test: 14 August 1937 v England

Domestic team information
- Years: Team
- 1923/24–1937/38: Otago
- 1928: Oxford University
- 1928/29: Auckland

Career statistics
Competition	Test	First-class
Matches	4	60
Runs scored	38	1,057
Batting average	7.59	13.04
100s/50s	0/0	0/0
Top score	19	45
Balls bowled	830	15,379
Wickets	5	228
Bowling average	98.59	27.58
5 wickets in innings	0	15
10 wickets in match	0	2
Best bowling	2/35	6/42
Catches/stumpings	2/–	34/–
- Source: Cricinfo, 1 April 2017

John Angus Dunning OBE (6 February 1903 – 24 June 1971) was a New Zealand cricketer who played in four Test matches between 1933 and 1937 and 60 first-class matches from the 1923–24 to 1937–38 seasons. He later became a headmaster in Australia.

== Academic and teaching career ==
Dunning was born at Omaha and educated at Auckland Grammar School and Auckland University College, later graduating MSc (Honours) in mathematics at the University of Otago. He was New Zealand's Rhodes Scholar in 1925 and, studying at New College, Oxford, he obtained his MA in mathematics.

He taught at John McGlashan College, Dunedin, from 1923 to 1925 and from 1927 to 1939; he was also sports master. He was recruited to the headmastership of Scots College, Warwick, in Queensland from 1939 to 1949 and Prince Alfred College, Adelaide, from 1949 to 1969, where he was said to exhibit "Scottish carefulness". He was appointed an Officer of the Order of the British Empire in the 1965 New Year Honours.

Dunning died suddenly at Adelaide in South Australia in June 1971, aged 68, survived by his wife and two daughters. Obituaries were published in the New Zealand Cricket Almanack in 1971 and in Wisden the following year.
