= Point Wells =

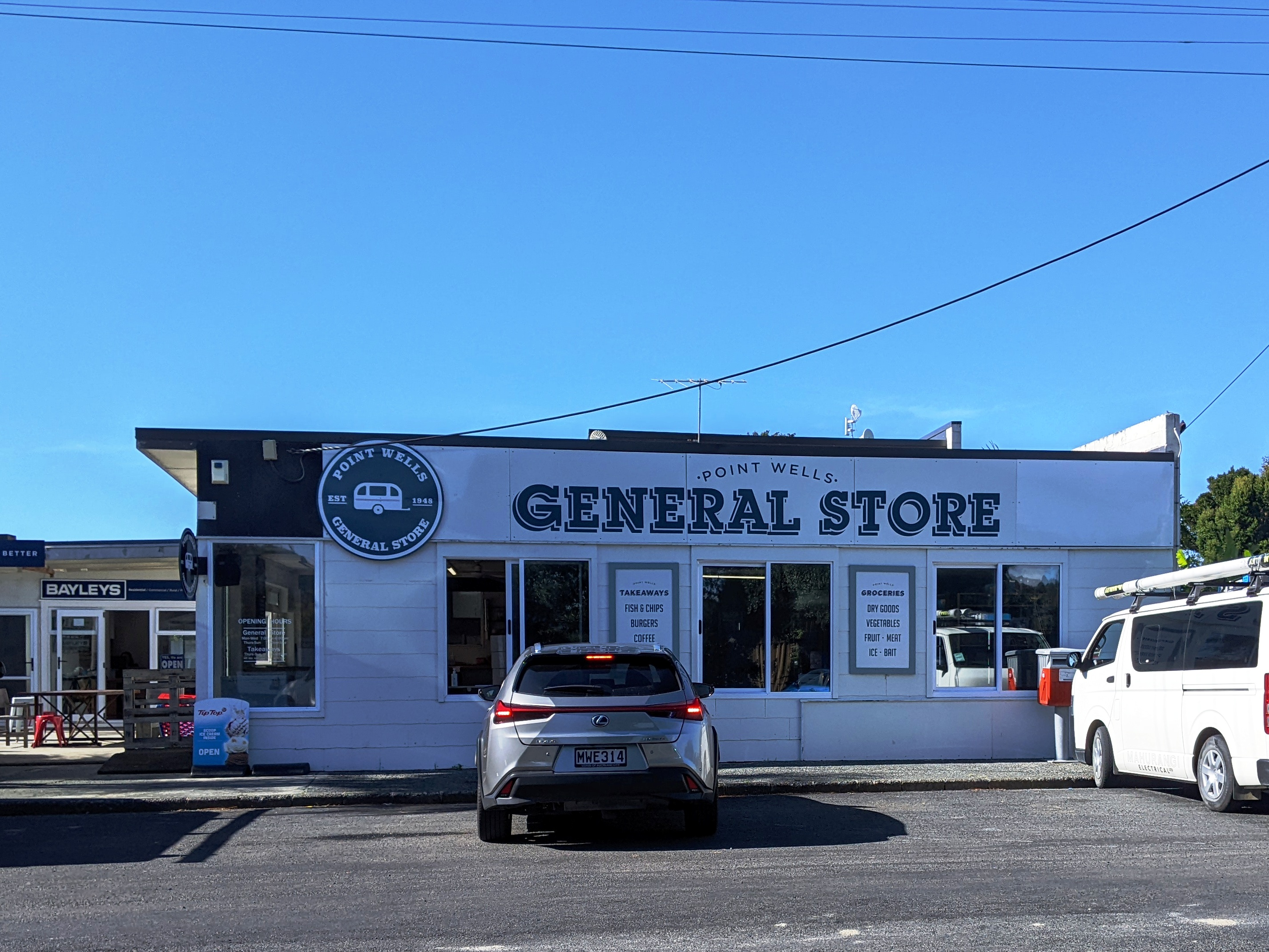
- Point Wells general store
- Interactive map of Point Wells
- Coordinates: 36.322°S 174.757°E
- Country: New Zealand
- Region: Auckland Region
- Ward: Rodney ward
- Community board: Rodney Local Board
- Subdivision: Warkworth subdivision
- Electorates: Kaipara ki Mahurangi; Te Tai Tokerau

Government
  - Territorial Authority: Auckland Council
  - Mayor of Auckland: Wayne Brown
  - Kaipara ki Mahurangi MP: Chris Penk
  - Te Tai Tokerau MP: Mariameno Kapa-Kingi

Area
  - Total: 0.80 km^{2} (0.31 sq mi)

Population (June 2025)
  - Total: 650
  - Density: 810/km^{2} (2,100/sq mi)

Point Wells is a rural settlement in the Auckland Region of New Zealand, at the tip of a peninsula between the Ōmaha River and Whangateau Harbour. Ōmaha is across the harbour but accessible by a causeway.

Point Wells was divided into sections in 1947 when a local farmer sold off some of his land. It grew slowly until the 1980s when most of the land was subdivided abd built upon.

Point Wells Hall was built in 1956 on donated land. It included a community library for many years. In 2008, the community gave control of running the hall to Rodney District Council, and two years later when Auckland Council was established it took the responsibility. In 2018, Auckland Council handed back the management to a subcommittee of the Point Wells Community and Ratepayers Association.

Omaha and Points Wells are the densest settlements in the Whangateau catchment area. Point Wells has minimal civic and community infrastructure (churches, schools etc.) with a large amount of holiday homes (bach).

== Demographics ==
Statistics New Zealand describes Point Wells as a rural settlement, which covers 0.80 km^{2} (0.31 sq mi) and had an estimated population of 650 as of June 2025, with a population density of 813 people per km^{2}. Point Wells is part of the larger Tawharanui Peninsula statistical area.

Historical population
Year	Pop.	±% p.a.
2006	354	—
2013	393	+1.50%
2018	513	+5.47%
2023	651	+4.88%

Point Wells had a population of 651 in the 2023 New Zealand census, an increase of 138 people (26.9%) since the 2018 census, and an increase of 258 people (65.6%) since the 2013 census. There were 315 males and 336 females in 246 dwellings. 1.4% of people identified as LGBTIQ+. The median age was 49.8 years (compared with 38.1 years nationally). There were 132 people (20.3%) aged under 15 years, 54 (8.3%) aged 15 to 29, 264 (40.6%) aged 30 to 64, and 207 (31.8%) aged 65 or older.

People could identify as more than one ethnicity. The results were 98.2% European (Pākehā), 8.3% Māori, 1.4% Pasifika, and 1.4% Asian. English was spoken by 98.6%, Māori language by 1.4%, and other languages by 7.4%. No language could be spoken by 1.4% (e.g. too young to talk). The percentage of people born overseas was 18.9, compared with 28.8% nationally.

Religious affiliations were 29.0% Christian, 0.5% Jewish, and 0.9% other religions. People who answered that they had no religion were 63.1%, and 6.9% of people did not answer the census question.

Of those at least 15 years old, 117 (22.5%) people had a bachelor's or higher degree, 273 (52.6%) had a post-high school certificate or diploma, and 78 (15.0%) people exclusively held high school qualifications. The median income was $41,400, compared with $41,500 nationally. 111 people (21.4%) earned over $100,000 compared to 12.1% nationally. The employment status of those at least 15 was that 186 (35.8%) people were employed full-time, 123 (23.7%) were part-time, and 6 (1.2%) were unemployed.

== Gallery ==
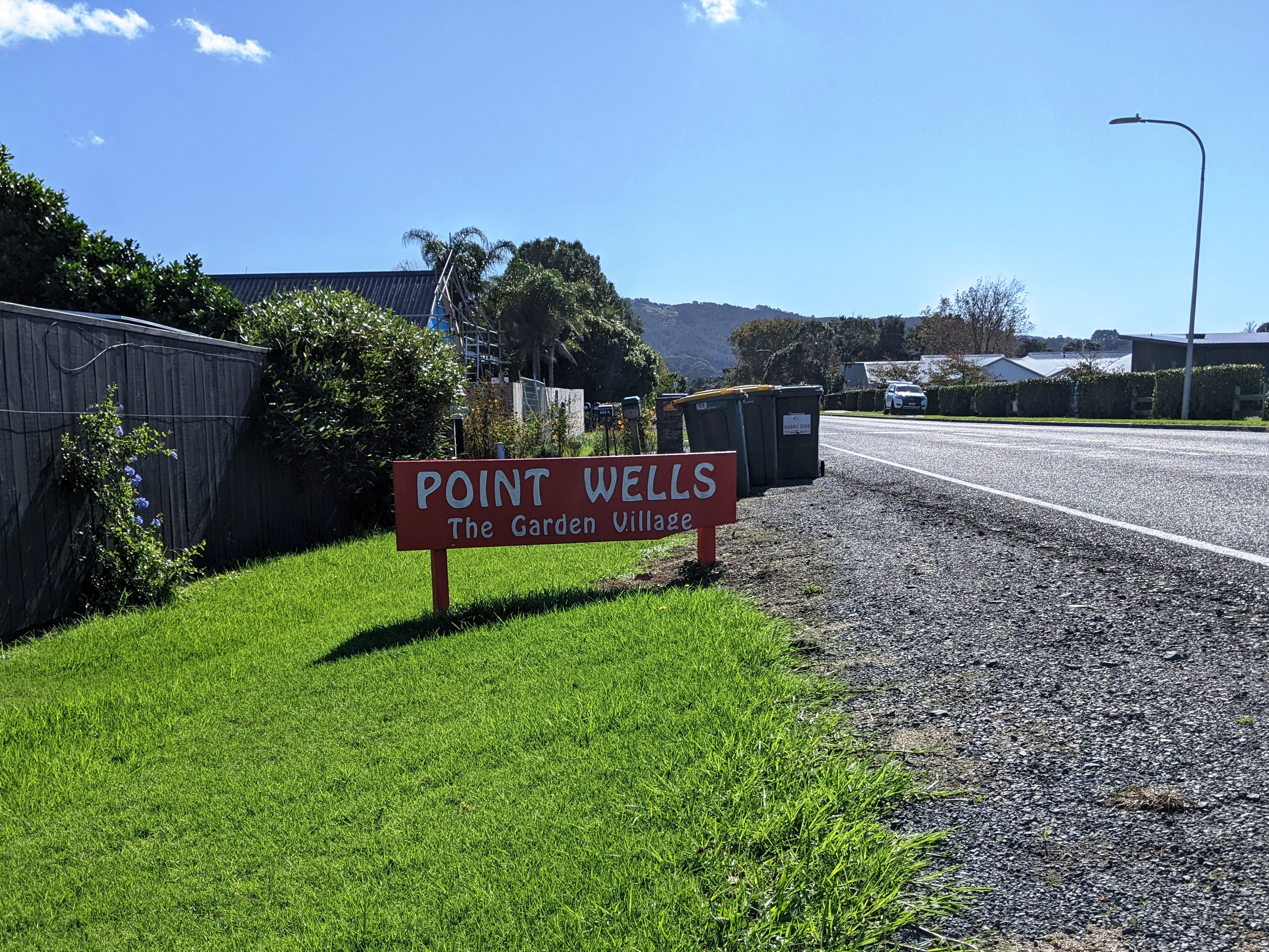
Point Wells welcome sign

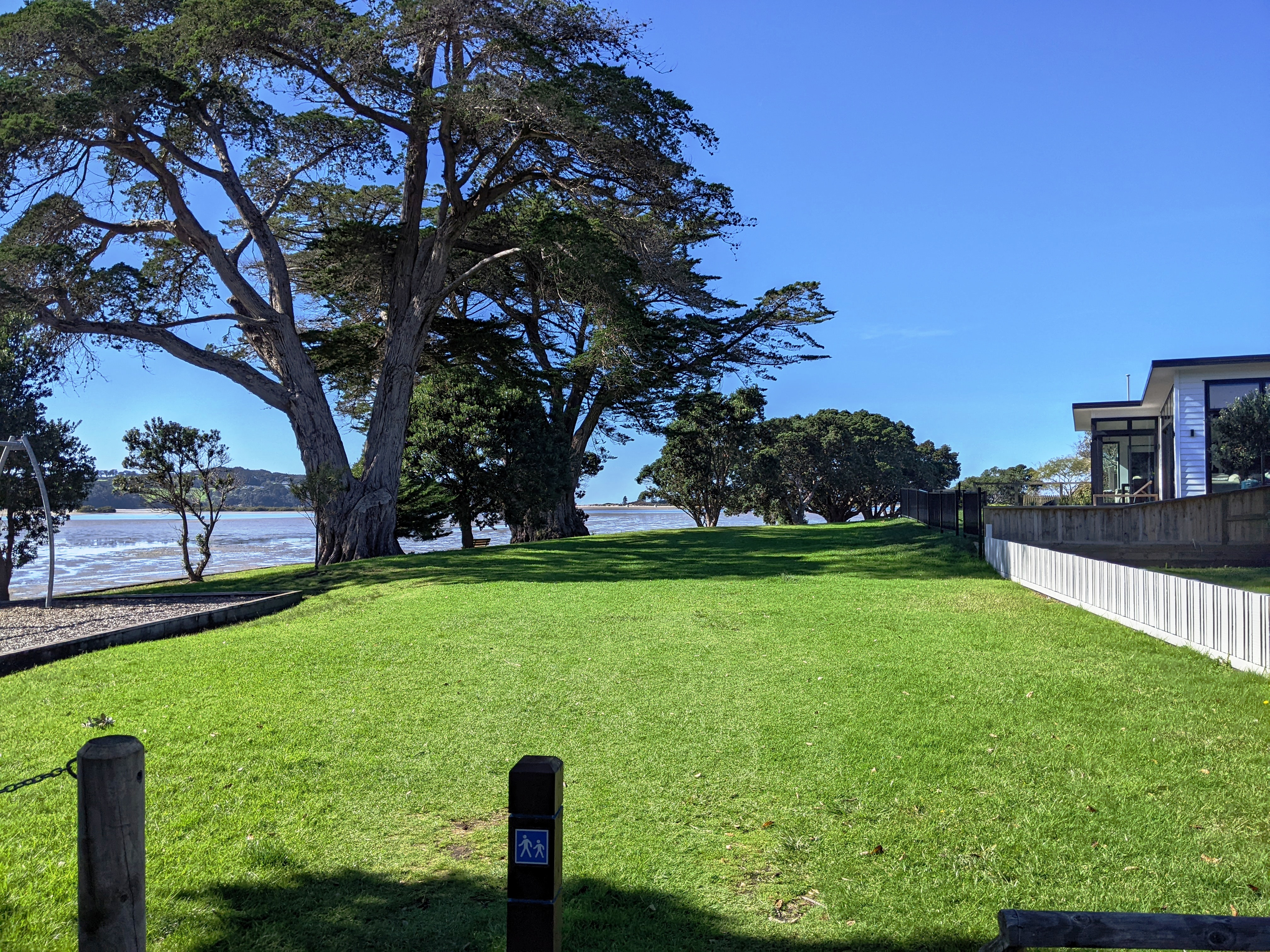
Point Wells Reserve
