= Leigh, New Zealand =

Leigh
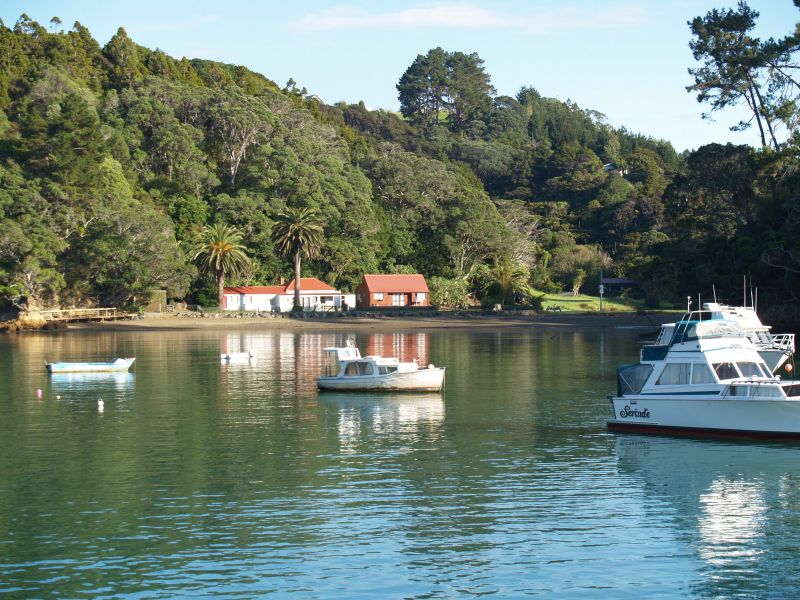
- Fishing boats in Leigh Harbour

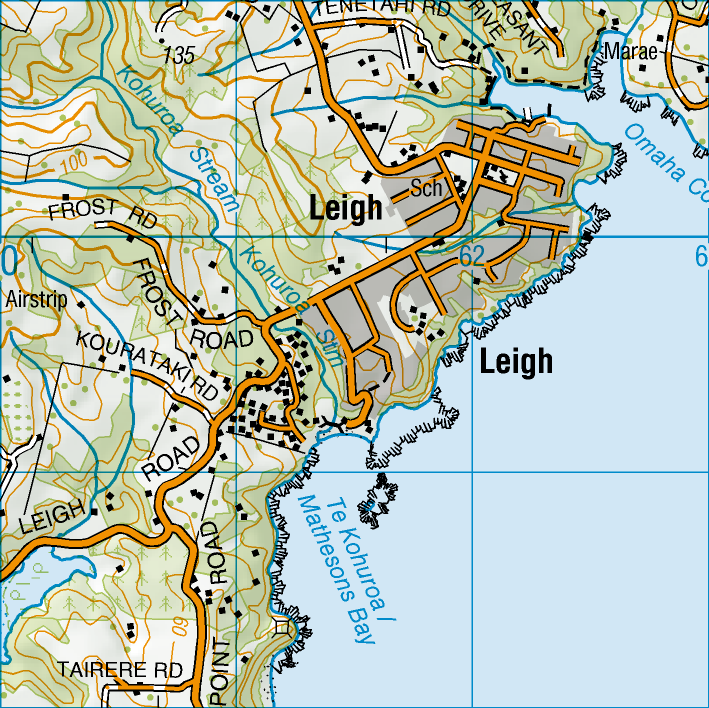
- Coordinates: 36.290°S 174.802°E
- Country: New Zealand
- Region: Auckland Region
- Ward: Rodney ward
- Community board: Rodney Local Board
- Subdivision: Warkworth subdivision
- Electorates: Kaipara ki Mahurangi; Te Tai Tokerau

Government
  - Territorial Authority: Auckland Council
  - Mayor of Auckland: Wayne Brown
  - Kaipara ki Mahurangi MP: Chris Penk
  - Te Tai Tokerau MP: Mariameno Kapa-Kingi

Area
  - Total: 1.12 km^{2} (0.43 sq mi)

Population (June 2025)
  - Total: 610
  - Density: 540/km^{2} (1,400/sq mi)

Leigh ( /ˌliː-/) is a coastal village in the north of the Auckland Region of New Zealand. It lies on the west side of Omaha Cove, a small inlet within Ōmaha Bay to the south of Cape Rodney. It is 13 km from Matakana, 21 km from Warkworth.

Leigh is the nearest town to Cape Rodney-Okakari Point Marine Reserve surrounding Te Hāwere-a-Maki / Goat Island. The reserve, the first of its type in New Zealand, is also the location for the University of Auckland's Marine Laboratory.

== Etymology ==
Leigh was originally known at Little Omaha but was renamed due to confusion with Big Omaha. The origin of the name 'Leigh' is unknown but may be named after Samuel Leigh.

== Geography ==
Leigh is located in Rodney in the northeastern Auckland Region, northeast of Whangateau Harbour, near Cape Rodney and Goat Island. Two bays border the township: Mathesons Bay to the west, and Omaha Cove to the east.

The Kohuroa Stream flows to the west of Leigh township, reaching Mathesons Bay. A series of cascades, the Kohuroa Stream Waterfalls, are found along the stream, accessible by the Matheson Bay Bush Walk.

=== Climate ===
Climate data for Leigh (1991–2020)
Month	Jan	Feb	Mar	Apr	May	Jun	Jul	Aug	Sep	Oct	Nov	Dec	Year
Mean daily maximum °C (°F)	23.5 (74.3)	24 (75)	22.9 (73.2)	20.9 (69.6)	18.7 (65.7)	16.5 (61.7)	15.6 (60.1)	15.8 (60.4)	17 (63)	18.4 (65.1)	20 (68)	22 (72)	19.6 (67.3)
Daily mean °C (°F)	20 (68)	20.6 (69.1)	19.6 (67.3)	17.8 (64.0)	15.8 (60.4)	13.7 (56.7)	12.8 (55.0)	12.9 (55.2)	13.9 (57.0)	15.1 (59.2)	16.5 (61.7)	18.5 (65.3)	16.4 (61.6)
Mean daily minimum °C (°F)	16.5 (61.7)	17.3 (63.1)	16.3 (61.3)	14.7 (58.5)	12.8 (55.0)	10.9 (51.6)	10 (50)	9.9 (49.8)	10.7 (51.3)	11.8 (53.2)	12.9 (55.2)	15 (59)	13.2 (55.8)
Average rainfall mm (inches)	66.9 (2.63)	70.5 (2.78)	90.4 (3.56)	82.4 (3.24)	94.9 (3.74)	112.5 (4.43)	129.7 (5.11)	119.8 (4.72)	94.9 (3.74)	79 (3.1)	64.4 (2.54)	81.1 (3.19)	1,086.5 (42.78)
Mean monthly sunshine hours	250.4	180.6	158.3	166.5	142.9	108.3	147.5	153.0	146.6	180.7	180.3	221.8	2,036.9
Source: NIWA (sun 1981–2010)

== History ==
In 1954 Leigh was made a county town of Rodney County.

St Michael and All Angels Church, A Gothic Revival Anglican church, was constructed in 1915 and opened on October 29 the same year. The church is registered as a category 2 building with Heritage New Zealand.

== Demographics ==
Statistics New Zealand describes Leigh as a rural settlement, which covers 1.12 km^{2} (0.43 sq mi) and had an estimated population of 610 as of June 2025, with a population density of 545 people per km^{2}. Leigh is part of the larger Cape Rodney statistical area.

Historical population for Leigh
Year	Pop.	±% p.a.
2006	501	—
2013	570	+1.86%
2018	606	+1.23%
2023	600	−0.20%

Leigh had a population of 600 in the 2023 New Zealand census, a decrease of 6 people (−1.0%) since the 2018 census, and an increase of 30 people (5.3%) since the 2013 census. There were 300 males, 297 females and 3 people of other genders in 273 dwellings. 3.0% of people identified as LGBTIQ+. The median age was 54.8 years (compared with 38.1 years nationally). There were 78 people (13.0%) aged under 15 years, 63 (10.5%) aged 15 to 29, 264 (44.0%) aged 30 to 64, and 195 (32.5%) aged 65 or older.

People could identify as more than one ethnicity. The results were 89.5% European (Pākehā); 16.0% Māori; 4.0% Pasifika; 2.5% Asian; 1.5% Middle Eastern, Latin American and African New Zealanders (MELAA); and 3.5% other, which includes people giving their ethnicity as "New Zealander". English was spoken by 98.0%, Māori language by 2.5%, and other languages by 11.5%. No language could be spoken by 1.5% (e.g. too young to talk). The percentage of people born overseas was 23.5, compared with 28.8% nationally.

Religious affiliations were 22.0% Christian, 0.5% Hindu, 0.5% Māori religious beliefs, 0.5% Buddhist, 0.5% New Age, and 1.5% other religions. People who answered that they had no religion were 66.0%, and 7.5% of people did not answer the census question.

Of those at least 15 years old, 111 (21.3%) people had a bachelor's or higher degree, 273 (52.3%) had a post-high school certificate or diploma, and 111 (21.3%) people exclusively held high school qualifications. The median income was $38,300, compared with $41,500 nationally. 57 people (10.9%) earned over $100,000 compared to 12.1% nationally. The employment status of those at least 15 was that 222 (42.5%) people were employed full-time, 90 (17.2%) were part-time, and 9 (1.7%) were unemployed.

=== Cape Rodney statistical area ===
Cape Rodney statistical area, which also includes Ti Point and Whangateau, stretches north to the border with Kaipara District and west almost to Wellsford. It covers 370.68 km^{2} (143.12 sq mi) and had an estimated population of 3,860 as of June 2025, with a population density of 10.4 people per km^{2}.

Historical population for Cape Rodney
Year	Pop.	±% p.a.
2006	2,760	—
2013	3,096	+1.65%
2018	3,525	+2.63%
2023	3,735	+1.16%

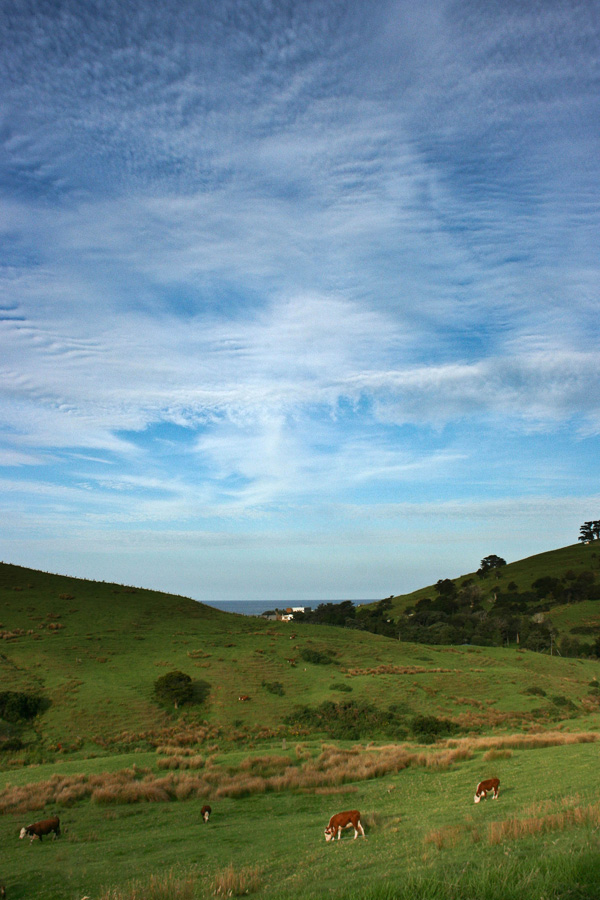
Leigh farmland

Cape Rodney had a population of 3,735 in the 2023 New Zealand census, an increase of 210 people (6.0%) since the 2018 census, and an increase of 639 people (20.6%) since the 2013 census. There were 1,881 males, 1,842 females and 12 people of other genders in 1,446 dwellings. 2.6% of people identified as LGBTIQ+. The median age was 48.6 years (compared with 38.1 years nationally). There were 621 people (16.6%) aged under 15 years, 477 (12.8%) aged 15 to 29, 1,764 (47.2%) aged 30 to 64, and 873 (23.4%) aged 65 or older.

People could identify as more than one ethnicity. The results were 91.0% European (Pākehā); 16.9% Māori; 4.0% Pasifika; 2.2% Asian; 1.1% Middle Eastern, Latin American and African New Zealanders (MELAA); and 2.9% other, which includes people giving their ethnicity as "New Zealander". English was spoken by 98.2%, Māori language by 2.6%, Samoan by 0.3%, and other languages by 7.4%. No language could be spoken by 1.6% (e.g. too young to talk). New Zealand Sign Language was known by 0.3%. The percentage of people born overseas was 18.0, compared with 28.8% nationally.

Religious affiliations were 25.9% Christian, 0.2% Hindu, 0.2% Islam, 1.5% Māori religious beliefs, 0.3% Buddhist, 0.6% New Age, 0.2% Jewish, and 1.3% other religions. People who answered that they had no religion were 62.6%, and 7.7% of people did not answer the census question.

Of those at least 15 years old, 546 (17.5%) people had a bachelor's or higher degree, 1,722 (55.3%) had a post-high school certificate or diploma, and 672 (21.6%) people exclusively held high school qualifications. The median income was $38,000, compared with $41,500 nationally. 339 people (10.9%) earned over $100,000 compared to 12.1% nationally. The employment status of those at least 15 was that 1,440 (46.2%) people were employed full-time, 606 (19.5%) were part-time, and 45 (1.4%) were unemployed.

== Recreation ==
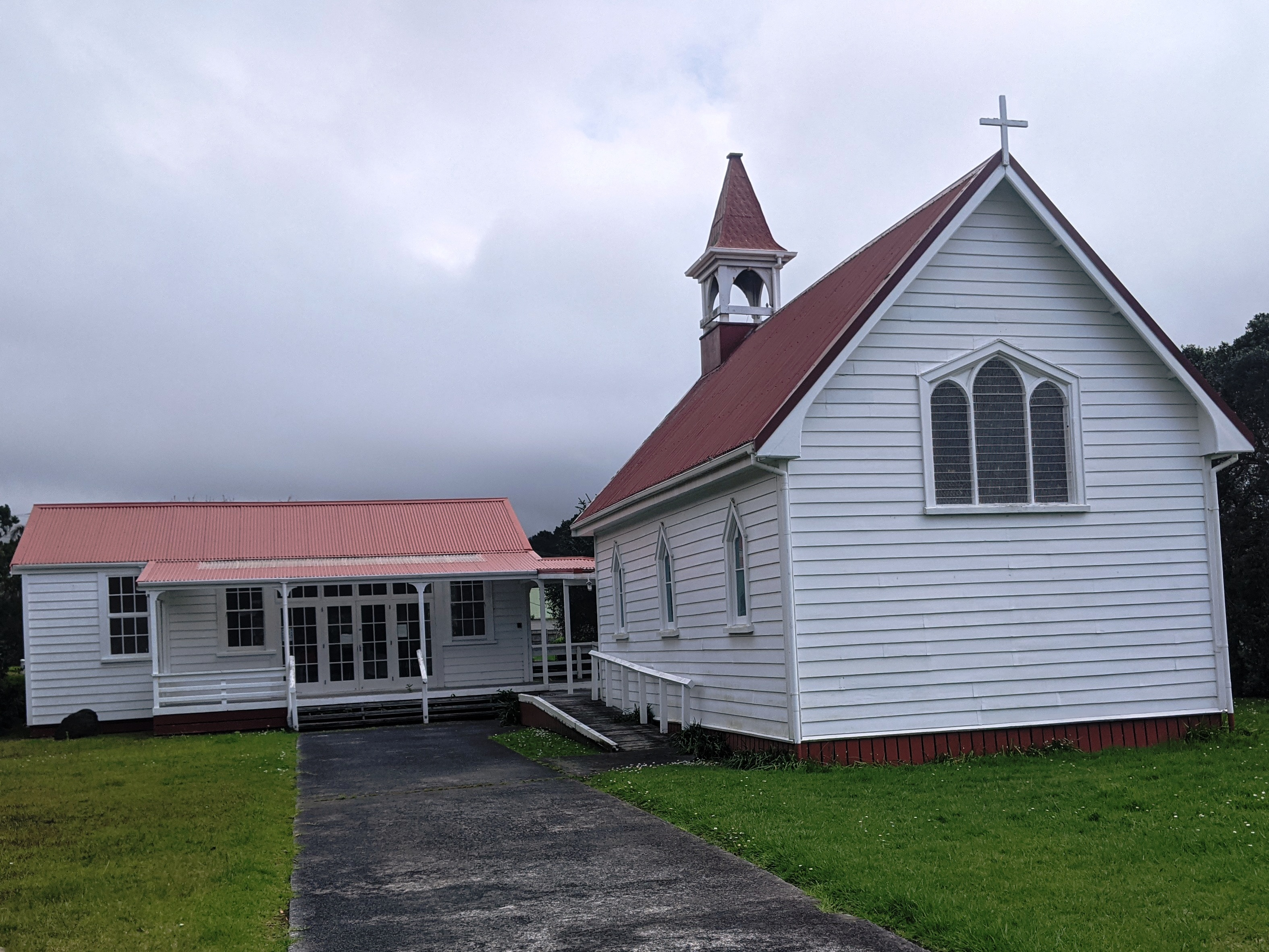
St Michaels and All Angels Anglican Church

The Leigh district provides several venues for rugby, golf, touch rugby, football and other sports. The Rodney district's rugby team, the "Rodney Rams", is based at Whangateau with clubrooms at Whangateau Reserve. The reserve is also used for local touch rugby tournaments.

There are a number of beaches close to Leigh including Te Hāwere-a-Maki / Goat Island, Mathesons Bay, Whangateau, Pākiri and Ōmaha. There are also numerous fishing spots and seafood hunting areas. Goat Island Marine Reserve provides several organised features including scenic marine observations, glass-bottom boat trips and scuba-diving; fishing is strictly prohibited.

"Daniel's Reef" is the most well known surfing spot in the Leigh area.

The Leigh Carnival is a fundraiser for the school and is held every Easter Sunday on the Leigh School field. The Leigh Volunteer Fire Brigade hosts an annual fishing competition.

== Media ==
The Leigh community newspaper is the Leigh Rag.

The Mahurangi Matters and Rodney Times newspapers are also delivered in the area.

== Marae ==
The local Ōmaha Marae is a traditional meeting ground for Ngāti Manuhiri, and its associated iwi of Ngātiwai. It includes Te Kiri meeting house.

== Education ==
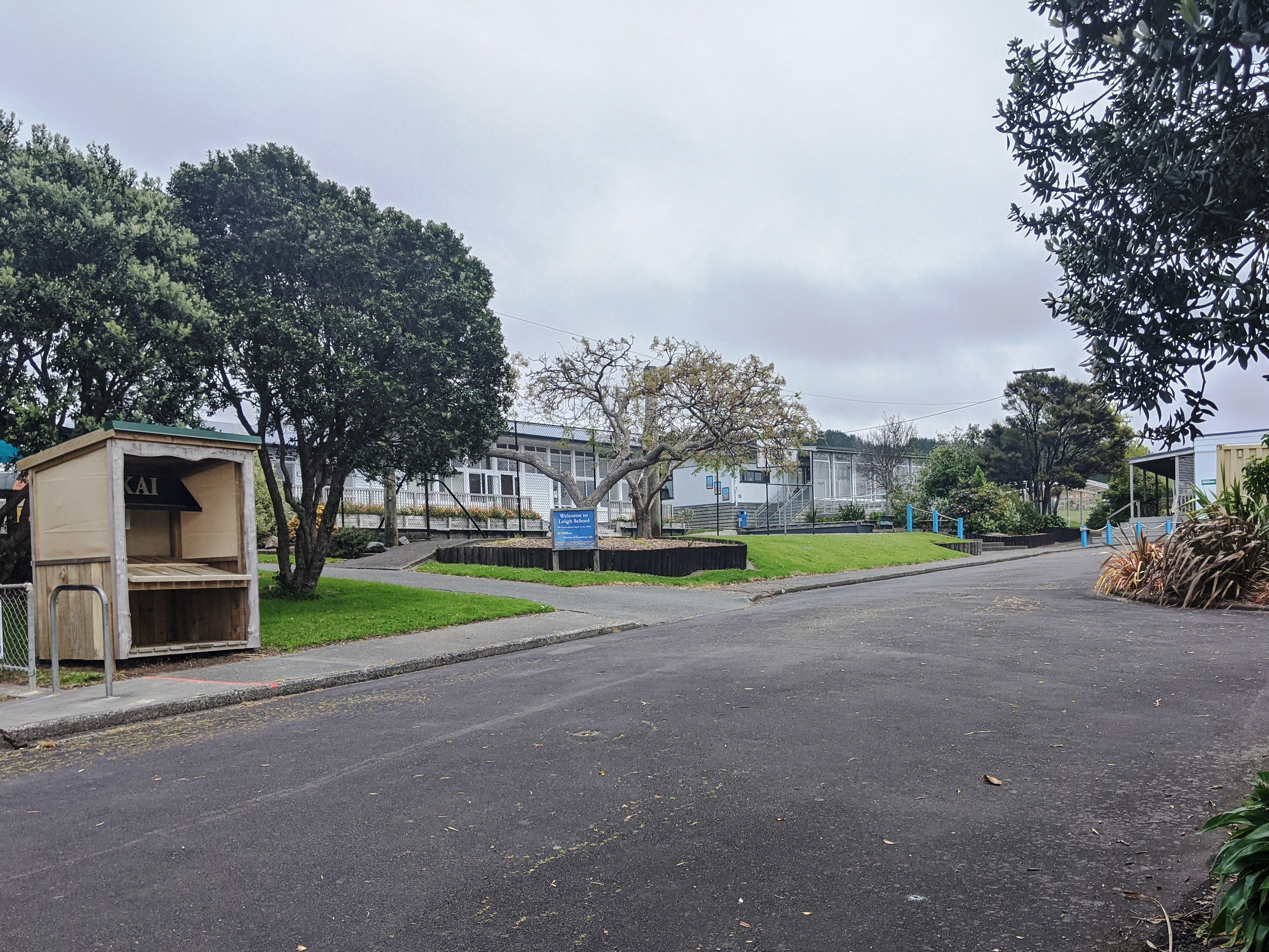
Leigh School

Leigh School is the local primary school. It is a coeducational contributing primary (years 1-6) school with a roll of 56 students as of July 2026. The school was established in 1874. The adjacent Leigh Community Preschool accepts children from age 6 months to 5 years. The two schools work together to provide a seamless, minimally stressful transition for children entering school. A number of children living in Leigh attend the much larger Matakana Primary, 10 km distant. Homeschooling is also popular in the Leigh area.

High school students are served by Mahurangi College in Warkworth and Rodney College in Wellsford. There are no intermediate schools in the Greater Warkworth District, therefore The Ministry of Education has referred intermediate students to the nearby colleges.

== Economy ==
Leigh is primarily a fishing village. It exports fresh fish both nationally and internationally.
