= Whangateau Harbour =

Harbour in Auckland Region, New Zealand

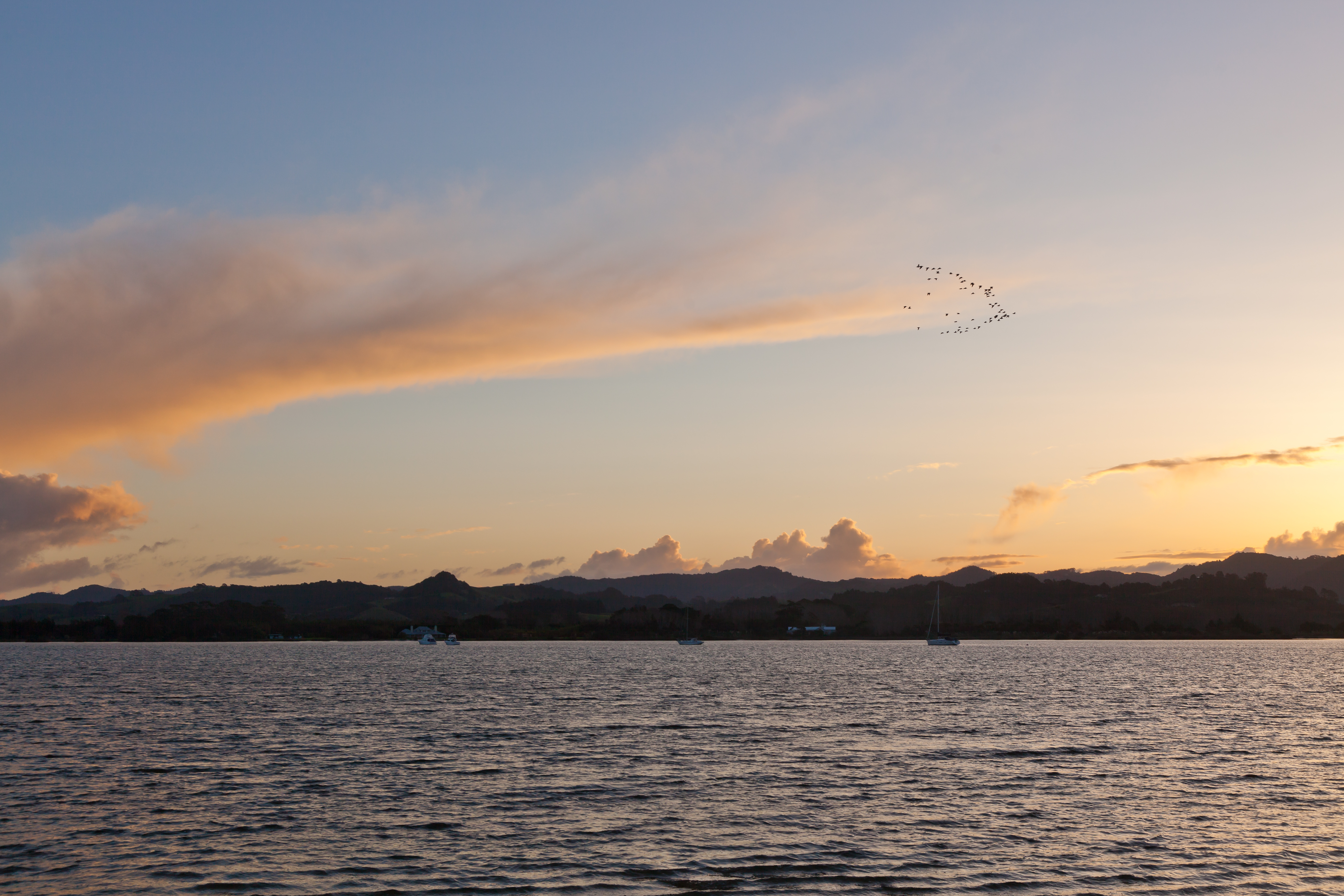
- Interactive map of Whangateau Harbour
- Location: Auckland Region, New Zealand
- Coordinates: 36.3261°S 174.7681°E
- River sources: Birdsalls Stream, Coxhead Creek, Ōmaha River, Tamahunga Stream, Waikokopu Creek
- Ocean/sea sources: Pacific Ocean
- Basin countries: New Zealand
- Max. length: 6.3 km (3.9 mi)
- Max. width: 1.9 km (1.2 mi)
- Surface area: 750 ha (1,900 acres)
- Islands: Horseshoe Island
- Settlements: Big Ōmaha, Ōmaha, Point Wells, Ti Point, Tramcar Bay, Whangateau

Location and extent of Whangateau Harbour

The Whangateau Harbour is a natural harbour in New Zealand. It is a sandspit estuary, located on the north-eastern coast of the Auckland Region north-east of Matakana, and empties into the Hauraki Gulf. Due to the harbour's high quality water and dense shellfish beds (primarily pipi), the harbour is a popular spot for shellfish gathering.

== Geography ==
The Whangateau Harbour is a sandspit estuary, separated from Ōmaha Bay by a sandspit. The modern harbour formed during the Holocene, after the formation of the sandspit. Horseshoe Island is an exposed sand-bar located in the centre of the harbour.

The Whangateau Harbour has almost complete tidal flushing, meaning it has some of the best water quality for a harbour in New Zealand.

== Flora and fauna ==
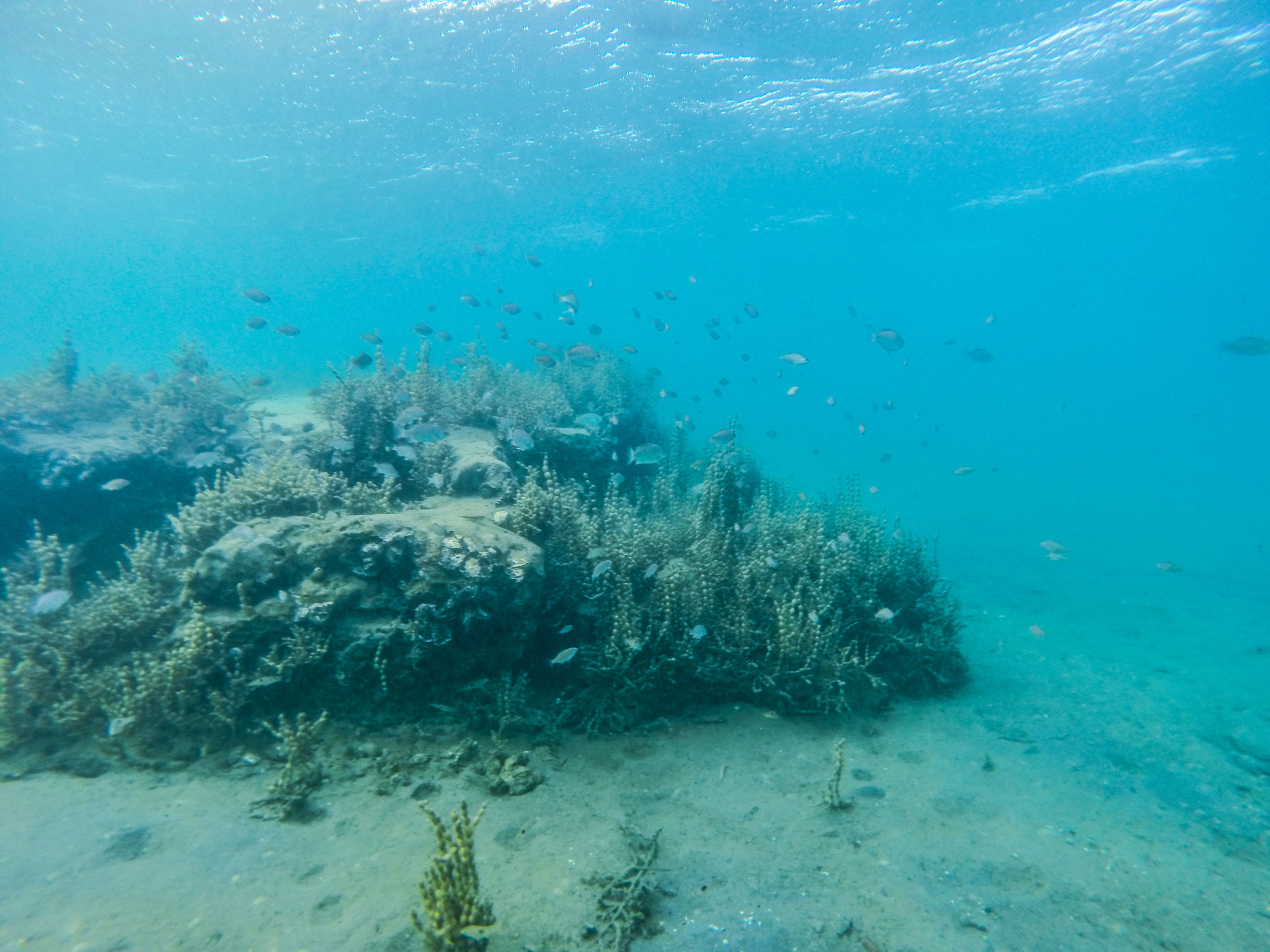
Many reefs can be found in the Whangateau Harbour

The harbour has a wide range of intertidal and subtidal reefs, supporting a wide range of benthic wildlife. High numbers of Scutus breviculus, octopuses and Australasian sea cucumbers live in the estuary. The harbour has dense beds of shellfish, primarily pipi (Paphies australis). The Harbour is made up of mangals composed of trees rather than bushes. There are a number of different types of algae, which house isopoda and amphipoda. It is also home to the tunnelling mud crab and different types of oyster.

The harbour is a popular spot to collect shellfish. It has been well-studied, due to the harbour's close location to the Leigh Marine Laboratory. In 2009, the area experienced a mortality event of cockles, with an 84% reduction in the large cockle population from the previous year. A further event took place in 2014, with the beds being closed to harvesting while samples were sent to the Ministry for Primary Industries.

== History ==
The Whangateau Harbour is within the traditional rohe of Ngāti Manuhiri. The name Whāngateau was a traditional Māori language name for the harbour, and refers to the strong tidal currents in the estuary. The harbour and surrounding Mahurangi area was first settled in the 14th century by Māori, descendants of the Moekākara, Tainui, Arawa migratory canoes. By the 16th century, the Tāmaki Māori who settled in the region begun to be known by the name Ngā Oho. The tribal affiliation Ngāti Manuhiri began in the 17th century, and refers to Manuhiri, one of the four sons of the Te Kawerau ā Maki rangatira Maki.

Prior to European settlement, six fortified pā defended the harbour, and the harbour (especially the Waikokopu to the south) were an important source of pipi and tuangi (cockles). The harbour was associated with the kūaka (bar-tailed godwit), which were traditionally harvested in the summer-time.

Ngāti Manuhiri settled the harbour until the late 19th century, however members of Ngāti Manuhiri have returned to the harbour in modern times. In the 1850s, land around the harbour was purchased by Ranulph Dacre. Between 1942 and 1963, 380,000 cubic metres of sand were mined from the Mangatawhiri Spit, leading to coastal erosion at Omaha. Land use around the harbour intensified in the 1960s, and in the 1970s the Omaha causeway was constructed, creating an east-west bridge between Omaha and Point Wells over the Waikokopu Creek.
