= Whangateau =

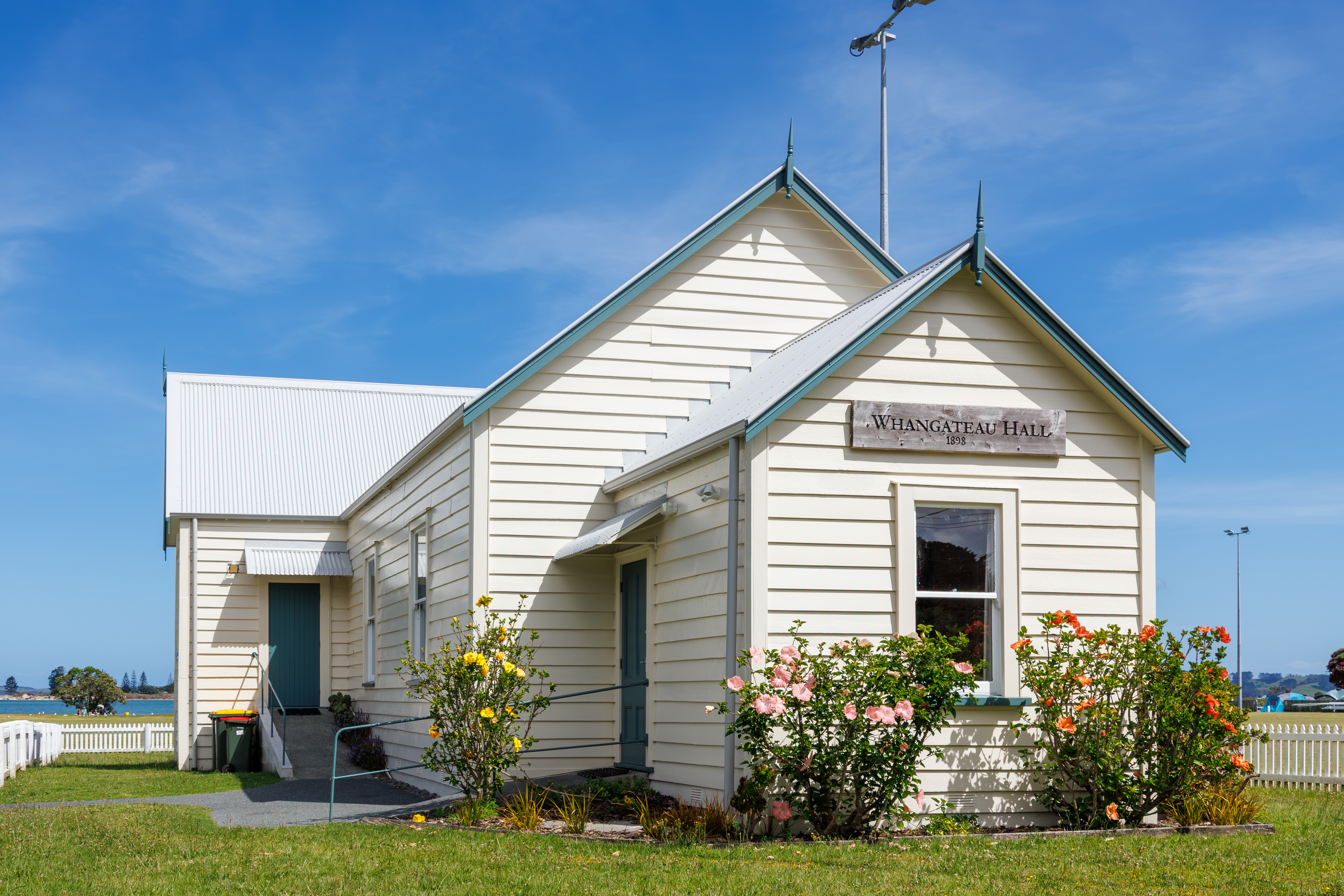
- Whangateau Hall

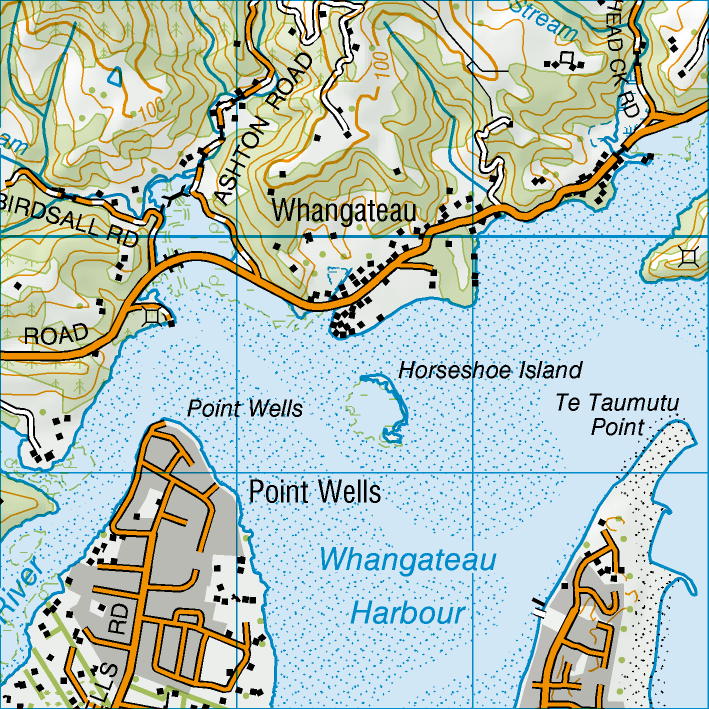
- Coordinates: 36.309°S 174.768°E
- Country: New Zealand
- Region: Auckland Region
- Ward: Rodney ward
- Community board: Rodney Local Board
- Subdivision: Warkworth subdivision
- Electorates: Kaipara ki Mahurangi; Te Tai Tokerau

Government
  - Territorial Authority: Auckland Council
  - Mayor of Auckland: Wayne Brown
  - Kaipara ki Mahurangi MP: Chris Penk
  - Te Tai Tokerau MP: Mariameno Kapa-Kingi

Area
  - Total: 1.16 km^{2} (0.45 sq mi)

Population (June 2025)
  - Total: 140
  - Density: 120/km^{2} (310/sq mi)

Whangateau is a coastal village on the shores of the Whangateau Harbour on the North Island of New Zealand. Whangateau is between Leigh and Big Omaha. During the late 19th century the land around Whangateau was subdivided into small 50 acres (20 ha) farms and Whangateau was established with support of the county and central government. The settlement remained small and has a population over 100.

== History ==
Archaeological evidence shows that the Whangateau Domain was the site of sporadic seasonal occupation from the mid-15th century to the 19th century.

By the time Europeans arrived in the Whangateau Harbour in the 1830s the area that is now Whangateau was controlled by Ngati Manuhiri. Ngati Manuhiri had settled the area between the Whangateau Harbour and Pakiri Beach since the 17th century.

William Webster, an American trader, purchased c.10,000 acres (4,000 ha) of land from Hauraki Maori in 1839. Ngati Raupo were unaware of the deal and in 1844 Webster's purchase was severely reduced in size by the Land Claims Commission and the land around the Whangateau Harbour was returned to Maori. Ranulph Dacre claimed to purchase 2,000 acres (810 ha) of land around the Whangateau Harbour but the local Maori disputed this and started driving off European settlers in the 1860s. Dacre sought government intervention but the government instead chose to compensate Dacre with excess Crown land in return for giving up his land claim. Afterwards the local Maori sold off the land to settlers.

The flat land around the Whangateau Harbour that is today the Whangateau Domain was sold by Dacre to Harry Ashton who established an orchard there. After Ashton was evicted a Pakeha Maori named Black Peter squatted there. The flat ended up being ploughed and cultivated by Maori who constructed a cottage and hall. It is not known what happened afterwards but Bethea Frost reports that a Maori chief from Mangatawhiri came to live on the flat, and after his death the area was abandoned.

The Land Act 1885 allowed for 50 acres (20 ha) sections to be divided and given to poorer families along with a small grant to help establish small farms on the land. The land around Whangateau was surveyed and divided into the 50 acre blocks. Whangateau was established as a small village with the government and Rodney County Council cooperating to establish a road from the nascent settlement to Little Omaha (Leigh) and Big Omaha.

A school was established in 1891 on the Whangateau flat with classes held in the afternoon due to the teacher working at Ti Point school in the mornings. In 1916 the school closed and children had to travel to Matakana School for education.

The Whangateau Hall was constructed in 1898 after the old Maori hall was demolished, it formally opened on 17 September 1902 on the Whangateau Domain. During the Second World War the hall was occupied by American soldiers. The Whangateau Hall is scheduled with Auckland Council.

In the northeast of the settlement is the village cemetery.

The Whangateau Domain is the main sporting ground for the wider area and is home to the Rodney Rams Rugby League club. The Domain is also the location of the Whangateau Hall.

== Demographics ==
Statistics New Zealand describes Whangateau as a rural settlement, which covers 1.16 km^{2} (0.45 sq mi) and had an estimated population of 140 as of June 2025, with a population density of 121 people per km^{2}. Whangateau is part of the larger Cape Rodney statistical area.

Historical population
Year	Pop.	±% p.a.
2006	117	—
2013	129	+1.40%
2018	126	−0.47%
2023	141	+2.28%

Whangateau had a population of 141 in the 2023 New Zealand census, an increase of 15 people (11.9%) since the 2018 census, and an increase of 12 people (9.3%) since the 2013 census. There were 69 males and 69 females in 51 dwellings. 4.3% of people identified as LGBTIQ+. The median age was 54.9 years (compared with 38.1 years nationally). There were 15 people (10.6%) aged under 15 years, 12 (8.5%) aged 15 to 29, 72 (51.1%) aged 30 to 64, and 45 (31.9%) aged 65 or older.

People could identify as more than one ethnicity. The results were 87.2% European (Pākehā), 19.1% Māori, 2.1% Pasifika, 2.1% Asian, and 4.3% other, which includes people giving their ethnicity as "New Zealander". English was spoken by 97.9%, Māori language by 6.4%, and other languages by 4.3%. New Zealand Sign Language was known by 2.1%. The percentage of people born overseas was 19.1, compared with 28.8% nationally.

Religious affiliations were 25.5% Christian, and 2.1% other religions. People who answered that they had no religion were 66.0%, and 6.4% of people did not answer the census question.

Of those at least 15 years old, 21 (16.7%) people had a bachelor's or higher degree, 69 (54.8%) had a post-high school certificate or diploma, and 27 (21.4%) people exclusively held high school qualifications. The median income was $29,300, compared with $41,500 nationally. 21 people (16.7%) earned over $100,000 compared to 12.1% nationally. The employment status of those at least 15 was that 54 (42.9%) people were employed full-time, 24 (19.0%) were part-time, and 3 (2.4%) were unemployed.
