= Mathesons Bay =

Bay in Auckland Region, New Zealand

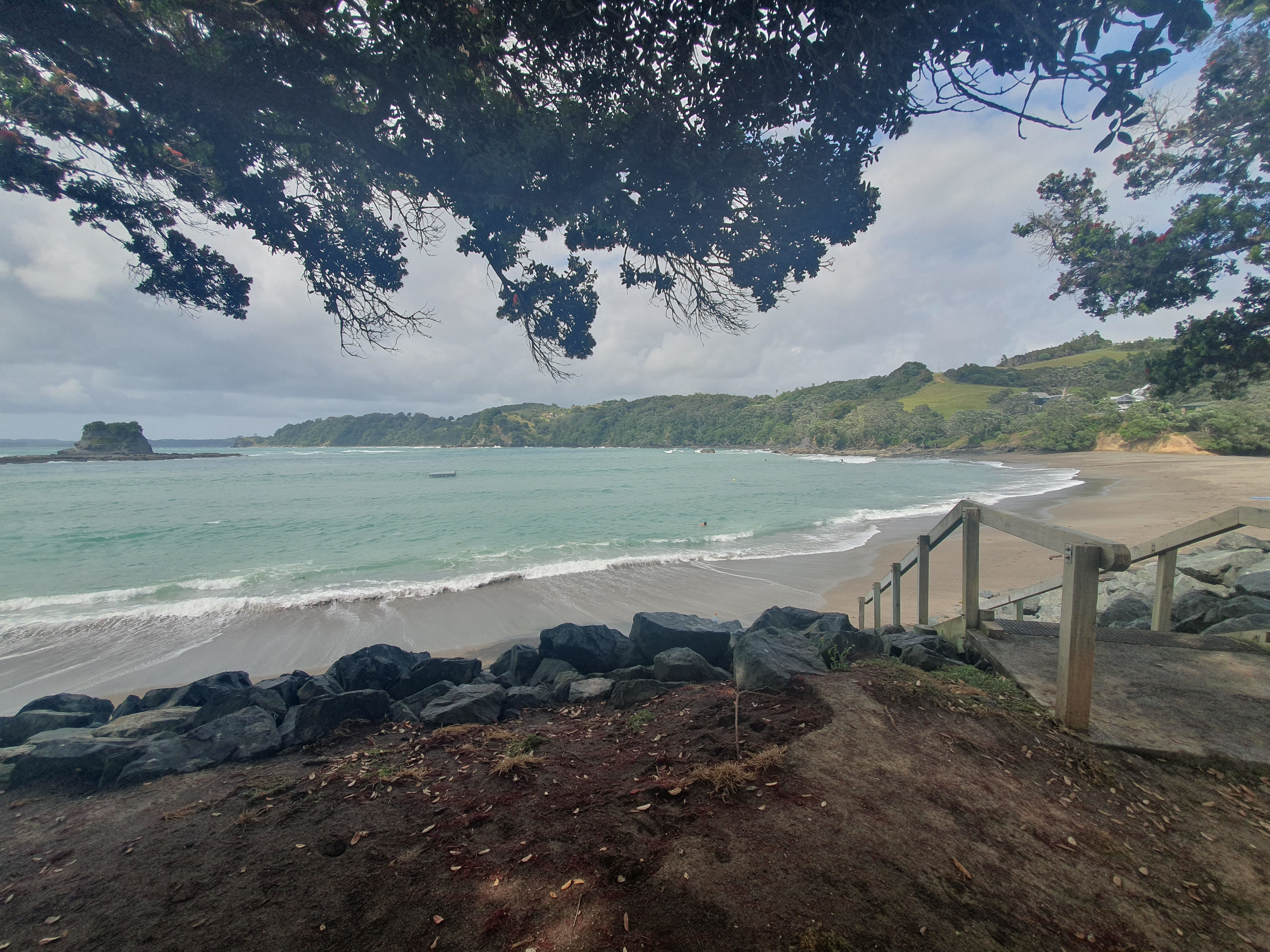

- Location within the Auckland Region
- Location: Auckland Region, New Zealand
- Coordinates: 36.302513°S 174.797427°E
- River sources: Kohuroa Stream
- Ocean/sea sources: Pacific Ocean
- Islands: Mathesons Bay Island

Mathesons Bay (Māori: Te Kohuroa; officially Te Kohuroa / Mathesons Bay) is a small beach in the Rodney district of the Auckland Region of New Zealand. It is 21 kilometres north-east of Warkworth, near the small community of Leigh. It comprises mainly holiday homes, with a small number of permanent residents.

== Description ==
Off shore there is a small island called Mathesons Bay Island which has some big rocks coming off which shelters the beach. There is sometimes a pontoon that is very fun to jump off. No dogs on beach between 9:00 am and 7:00 pm from the start of labour weekend to the end of Easter Monday, But for the rest of the year dogs are allowed on whenever they want. There is a small playground with a short walk up the hillside. There is a walk way that starts at Mathesons Bay and goes just past the end of Matheson Bay Road.

== Geology and palaeontology ==
The rocks at Mathesons Bay comprise Waipapa Terrane greywacke overlain by sediments of the early Miocene Waitemata Group, the latter of which is divided between the basal, shallow marine Cape Rodney Formation, and the turbidite deposits of the Pakiri Formation. These sediments form part of sequence that is inferred to reflect the subsidence of the area from a shallow rocky shore to a deep marine basin beginning approximately 21.7 million years ago. Many fossil invertebrates can be found in the cliffs and rock platforms, notably brachiopods (Notosaria, Magasella), barnacles (Epopella, Tasmanobalanus, Bathylasma), bivalves (Eucrassatella, Crenostrea), gastropods (Sarmaturbo, Cellana), corals (Cyathoseris, Leptoseris, Keratoisis), an echinoid (Phyllacanthus) and bryozoans. The remnant of a fossilized methane seep was formerly exposed in the cliffs to the north of Mathesons Bay Reserve, but has subsequently been buried by rockfalls.
