= Smelting House ruins =

Heritage listed ruins of a copper smelter on Kawau Island, New Zealand

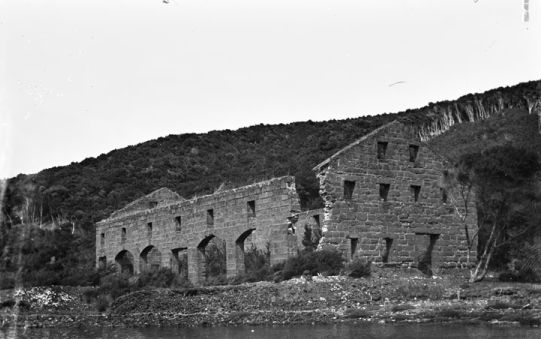
- Smelting House ruins on Kawau Island in the 1930s
- Interactive map of the Smelting House ruins area

General information
- Location: Bon Accord Harbour; Kawau Island; New Zealand
- Coordinates: 36°25′13.29″S 174°50′14.02″E
- Completed: 1849

Heritage New Zealand – Category 1
- Designated: 24 November 1983
- Reference no.: 10

The Smelting House ruins on Kawau Island, New Zealand, belong to the copper mine established in 1844. As there were problems with combustion of the copper ore during the sea voyage to Wales or Australia, tenders were called in 1848 for the erection of a copper mine smelter. The Auckland architect Walter Robertson designed a simple building completely built of Waitematā sandstone. Opened in July 1849, it was New Zealand's first smelting house. The smelter was no longer functioning in September 1855, and shortly after that, the mine closed altogether.

After the Battle of Rangiriri, which was part of the Invasion of the Waikato, the building briefly housed the 183 Māori prisoners taken in that battle. Guarded by just six wardens, they escaped in September 1864 and eventually returned to the Waikato.

The smelter site was purchased as a reserve in 1977. The ruins were registered by the New Zealand Historic Places Trust (now called Heritage New Zealand) on 24 November 1983 with registration number 10. The ruins have a category I listing. As of 2015, about 50% of the walls remain standing on three sides of the building. The site can be visited by boat only.
