= Mount Tamahunga =

Mountain in New Zealand

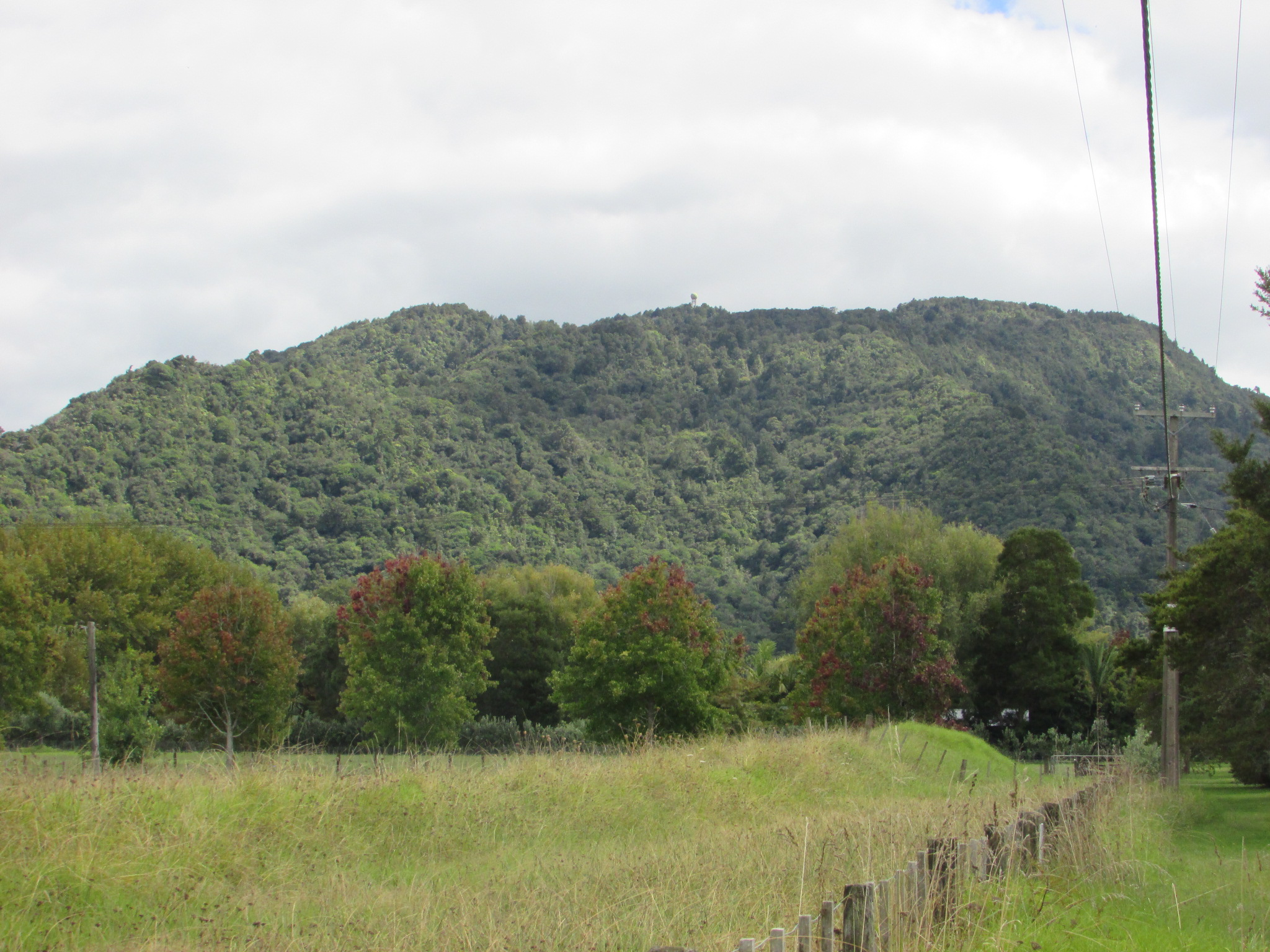

Highest point
- Elevation: 437 m (1,434 ft)
- Coordinates: 36.29928°S 174.71426°E

Geography
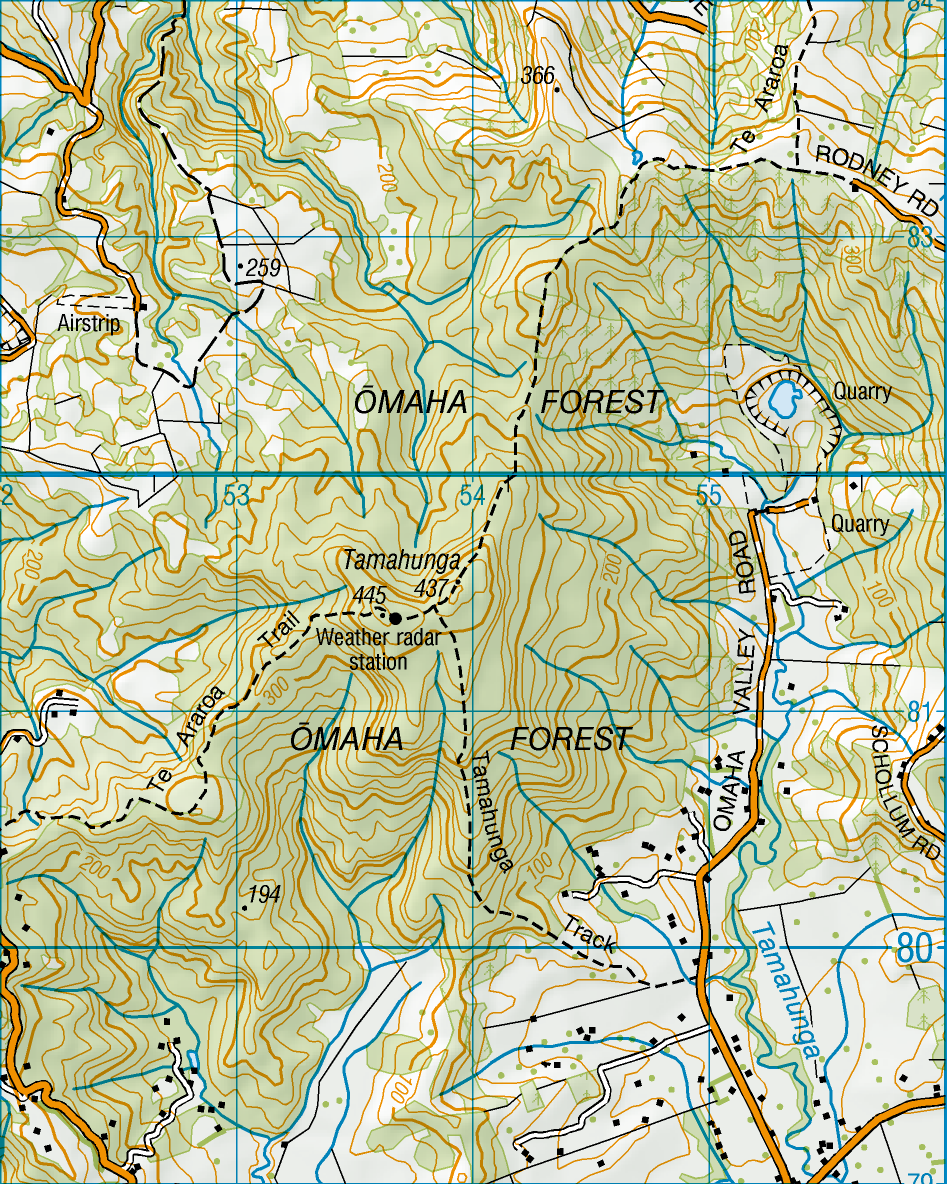
- Location: Big Omaha Valley
- Country: New Zealand
- Region: Auckland Region

Mount Tamahunga is the tallest mountain in the Mahurangi area. Situated in the Big Omaha Valley and rising to 437 m (1,434 ft), the mountain forms part of a large taraire forest that is a habitat for many threatened species including the North Island brown kiwi, Hochstetter's frog, and New Zealand long-tailed bat.

== Etymology ==
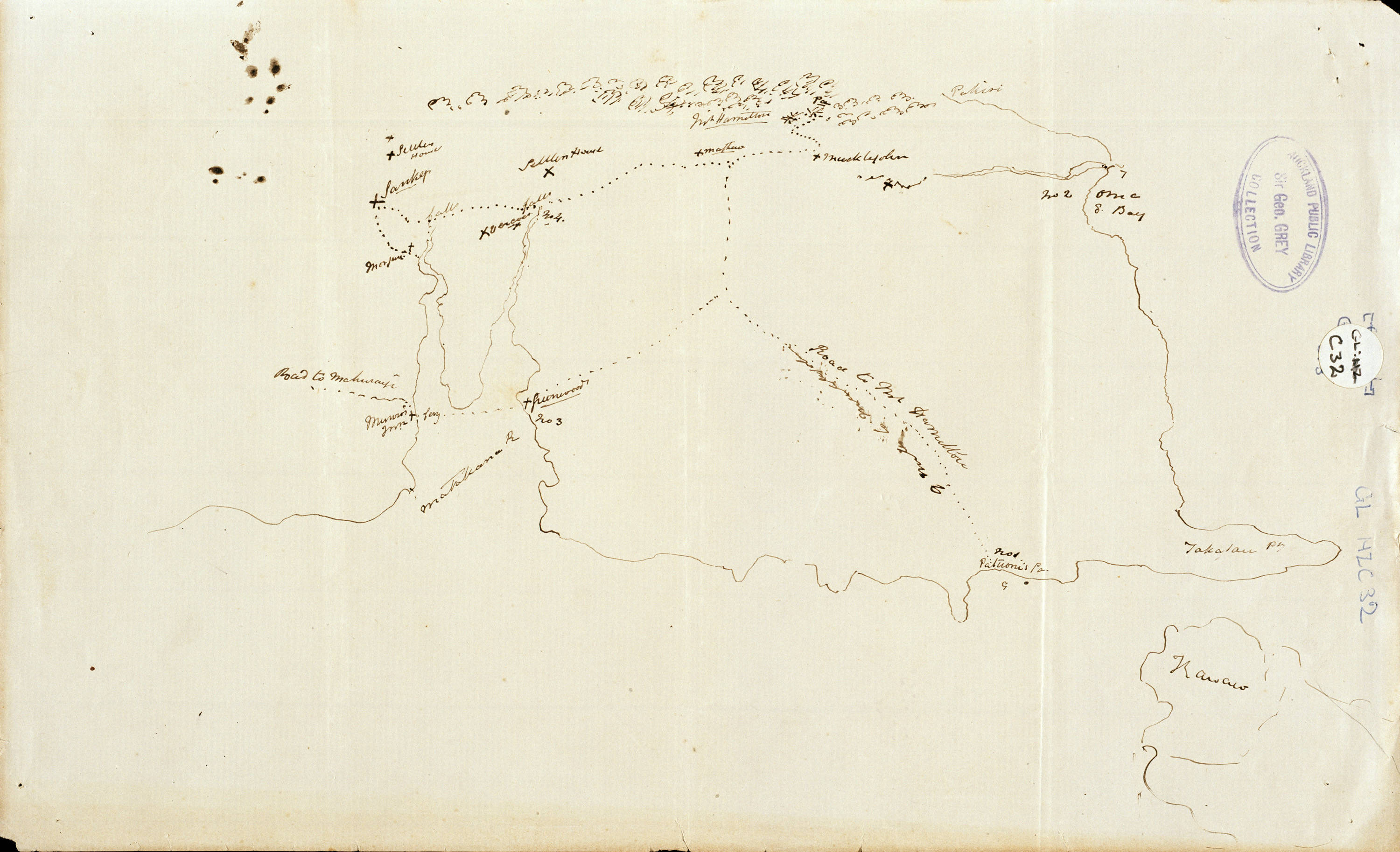
An 1864 map of Mount Hamilton

Mount Tamahunga was known as Mount Hamilton in the 19th century.

== Geography ==
Mount Tamahunga rises to 437 m (1,434 ft) and is part of a larger taraire forest. This forest is mostly old growth and has the largest population of rimu trees in the Rodney area The ridge line shelters the Big Omaha Valley and Whangateau catchment from winds and rainfall. A 5.6 km (3.5 mi) eponymous stream runs from the mountain to the Ōmaha River.

== Ecology ==
Pittosporum kirkii (Kirk's kohukohu), Astelia hastata (perching lily), A. microsperma, Parablechnum procerum (mountain kiokio), Raukaua, and Metrosideros robusta (northern rata) are found at the summit. Libertia flaccidifolia was described from a sample taken from Mount Tamahunga and was thought to be endemic to the mountain but is instead found in a small range around the mountain. The Mount Tamahunga forest marks the southern extremity of the range of Nestigis cunninghamii and Cyathea smithii (soft tree fern).

Mount Tamahunga is home to birds that are common in the Auckland region such as the fantail, tūī, New Zealand wood pigeon (kereru), swamp harrier, sacred kingfisher, grey warbler, silvereye, chaffinch, yellowhammer, and shining bronze cuckoo, as well as threatened species such as the North Island brown kiwi, the tomtit, and the New Zealand kaka. Other species include native fish, the New Zealand long-tailed bat, the long-finned eel, and Hochstetter's frog. The eel, Paranephrops planifrons (northern crayfish), and Gobiomorphus basalis (Cran's bully) are found in the Tamahunga Stream.

The Rodney District Council had scheduled Mount Tamahunga as a Significant Natural Area and the Mount Tamahunga forest forms part of the Omaha Ecological Area administered by the Department of Conservation. The area has the highest diversity of native plants and greatest canopy density (77%) in the Auckland region.

Feral goats have been eliminated from the forest. Feral pigs, possums, rats, and stoats continue to have an impact in the forest and trapping of these pests is on-going.

North Island brown kiwi were reintroduced to Mount Tamahunga in 2025 following trapping efforts to reduce pests.

== History ==
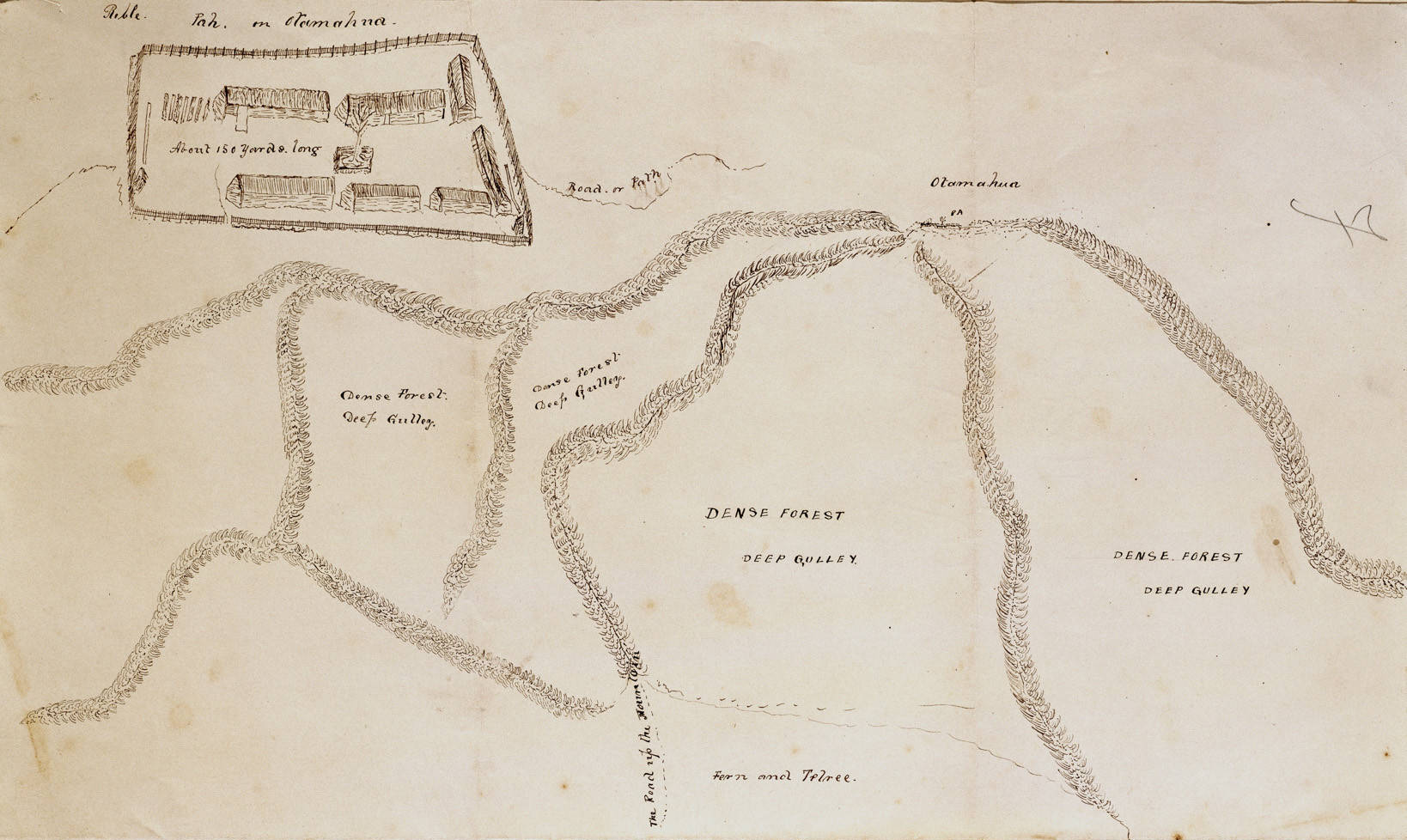
Map of a Maori pā on Otamahua (Mount Tamahunga)

In September 1864 Waikato Maori prisoners on Kawau Island escaped and established themselves near the summit of the mountain. Local farmer John Meiklejohn escorted botanist Thomas Kirk to the summit, where they were attacked by the Maori, who suspected Kirk to be in the army. Eventually a wife of one of the chiefs intervened and the Maori laid down their arms.

In the 1980s a greywacke quarry was established at the mountain and is still operating, producing construction aggregate.

A weather radar station is located at the summit of Mount Tamahunga. It was commissioned in 1989 and is due to be replaced around 2027.

Te Araroa walkway passes over the mountain.
