= Omaha Cove =

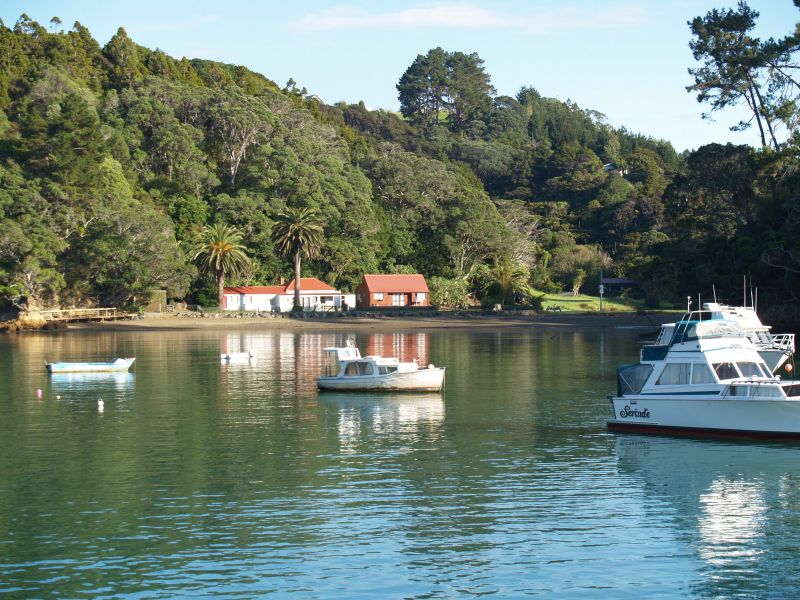

- Location within the Auckland Region
- Location: Auckland Region, New Zealand
- Coordinates: 36.288°S 174.810°E
- Ocean/sea sources: Omaha Bay, Pacific Ocean
- Settlements: Leigh

Omaha Cove, also known as Leigh Harbour, is a bay in the Auckland Region of New Zealand's North Island. It is located to the north-east of the township of Leigh in the Rodney local board area.

== Geography ==
The Omaha Cove is adjacent to the township of Leigh, and is a smaller bay within the larger Omaha Bay. The Leigh Scenic Reserve is found directly north of the cove, as well as the Omaha Marae.

== History ==
The harbour's traditional name is Whānga ō Maha, and it is within the rohe of Ngāti Manuhiri. The cove was an important source of sea resources and shelter for Ngāti Manuhiri, and the northern shore is the location of a traditional kāinga. From 1858, Ngāti Manuhiri rangatira Te Kiri Kaiparaoa ran a trading service and commercial fishing operation from the harbour.

The township of Leigh was established in 1858 to the south of the harbour, when the Crown sold eight allotments. John Wyatt and C. S. Clarke were early European settlers in the area in the 1860s. In 1923, the Wyatt family established a sawmill at the mouth of the harbour, providing boxes for the fruit growers in the area.

In 1957, Leigh Fisheries (also known as Lee Fish) began operating from the harbour. Omaha Marae opened to the north of the cove in 1986.

== Amenities ==
The Leigh Harbour Boat Ramp is a fishing spot for anglers, and is the closest boat ramp that can access the Cape Rodney-Okakari Point Marine Reserve to the north. The Leigh Harbour Walkway borders much of the cove, between Cape Rodney Road and Leigh township. The walkway closed in November 2022 due to landslides.
