= Ti Point =

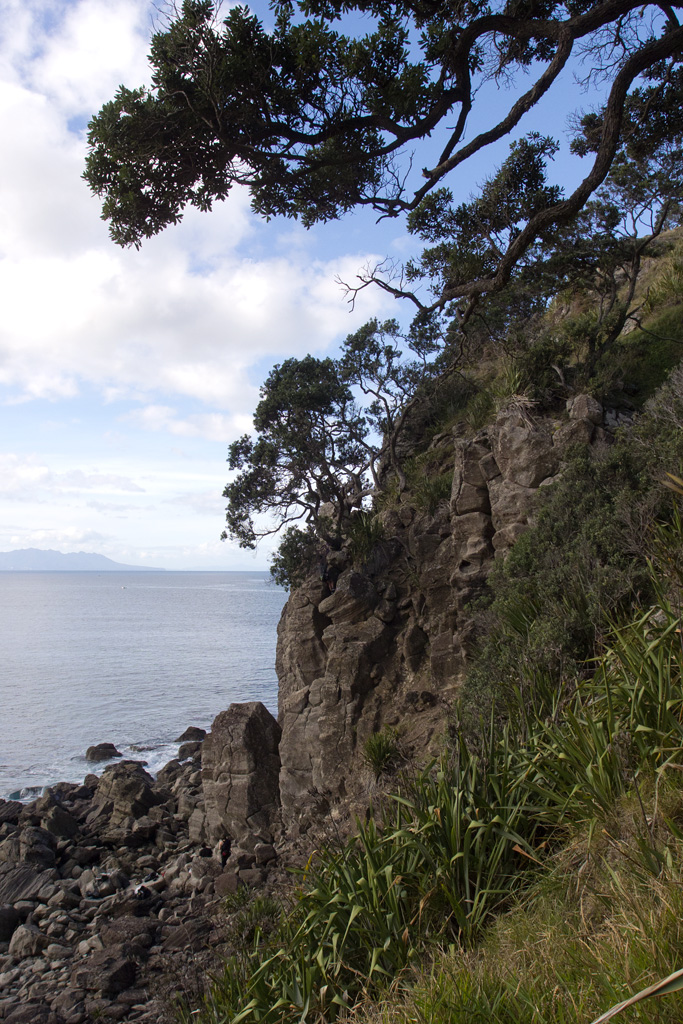
- Ti Point
- Interactive map of Ti Point
- Coordinates: 36°19′02″S 174°47′24″E
- Country: New Zealand
- Region: Auckland Region
- Ward: Rodney ward
- Community board: Rodney Local Board
- Subdivision: Warkworth subdivision
- Electorates: Kaipara ki Mahurangi; Te Tai Tokerau

Government
  - Territorial Authority: Auckland Council
  - Mayor of Auckland: Wayne Brown
  - Kaipara ki Mahurangi MP: Jessica Rowe
  - Te Tai Tokerau MP: TBD

Area
  - Total: 2.29 km^{2} (0.88 sq mi)

Population (June 2025)
  - Total: 150
  - Density: 66/km^{2} (170/sq mi)

Ti Point is a coastal point between the New Zealand villages of Leigh and Whangateau, located in the Rodney district. Ti Point is situated very close to Leigh and Goat Island, and is just over one hour drive north of Auckland. It is used for fishing, boating, hiking, rock climbing and yachting.

== Geology ==
Ti Point is formed from the remnants of a Miocene era volcano, which erupted between 10 and 7 million years ago. Much of the peninsula is the eroded and exhumed volcanic plumbing that remains from the volcano.

== History ==
When Europeans arrived in New Zealand, there were no Māori inhabitants of Ti Point, though there were thriving communities all around, in what would become Leigh and Omaha. The remains of an ancient Pa (a fortified camp or village) can be seen just above the point itself.

The first European to settle Ti Point was William Arthur Torkington, a builder and carpenter from Manchester, England. Several of William's descendants still live on Ti Point, and in the surrounding areas, and one of the few remaining buildings built by William, a church, can be seen in nearby Matakana, at the Matakana Country Park.

== Demographics ==
Statistics New Zealand describes Tī Point as a rural settlement, which covers 2.29 km^{2} (0.88 sq mi) and had an estimated population of 150 as of June 2025, with a population density of 66 people per km^{2}. Tī Point is part of the larger Cape Rodney statistical area.

Historical population
Year	Pop.	±% p.a.
2006	84	—
2013	105	+3.24%
2018	132	+4.68%
2023	156	+3.40%

Tī Point had a population of 156 in the 2023 New Zealand census, an increase of 24 people (18.2%) since the 2018 census, and an increase of 51 people (48.6%) since the 2013 census. There were 78 males and 78 females in 57 dwellings. 5.8% of people identified as LGBTIQ+. The median age was 47.6 years (compared with 38.1 years nationally). There were 27 people (17.3%) aged under 15 years, 21 (13.5%) aged 15 to 29, 78 (50.0%) aged 30 to 64, and 30 (19.2%) aged 65 or older.

People could identify as more than one ethnicity. The results were 94.2% European (Pākehā), 9.6% Māori, 3.8% Pasifika, 1.9% Asian, and 3.8% other, which includes people giving their ethnicity as "New Zealander". English was spoken by 96.2%, Māori language by 1.9%, and other languages by 3.8%. No language could be spoken by 3.8% (e.g. too young to talk). The percentage of people born overseas was 17.3, compared with 28.8% nationally.

Religious affiliations were 9.6% Christian, 1.9% New Age, and 1.9% other religions. People who answered that they had no religion were 84.6%, and 1.9% of people did not answer the census question.

Of those at least 15 years old, 39 (30.2%) people had a bachelor's or higher degree, 69 (53.5%) had a post-high school certificate or diploma, and 21 (16.3%) people exclusively held high school qualifications. The median income was $44,700, compared with $41,500 nationally. 24 people (18.6%) earned over $100,000 compared to 12.1% nationally. The employment status of those at least 15 was that 60 (46.5%) people were employed full-time and 21 (16.3%) were part-time.

== Wine-making ==
Since the late 1990s, wine has been produced at the Ti Point Winery, in the Matakana wine region. Their wines have won gold medals at several wine shows, including the Spiegelau International Wine Competition and the New Zealand International Wine Show.

== Amenities ==
The Ti Point Walkway follows the southern coast of Ti Point, traversing coastal bush and beaches.

=== Ti Point Reptile Park ===
Ti Point Reptile Park was founded by Ivan Borich in 1972 and he still privately owns and operates it as of September 2020.

The park contains a wide variety of reptiles, including tortoise, lizards, and Tuatara – a species of reptile only found in New Zealand.

Although the park specialises and contains predominantly reptiles, the park began as a traditional zoo, and still houses Capuchin monkeys and a Cockatoo.
