= Ōmaha River =

River in the Auckland Region, New Zealand

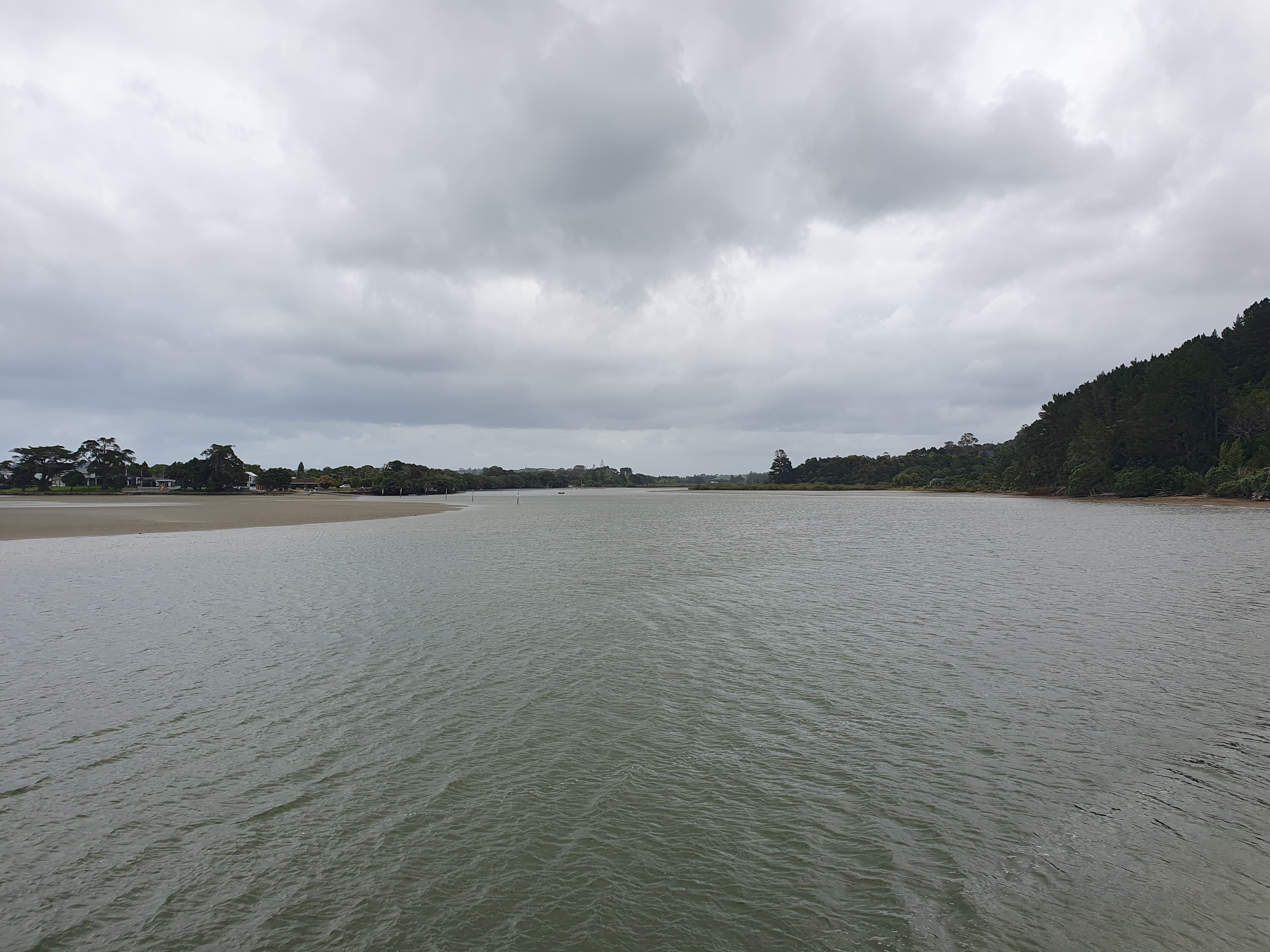
- The mouth of the Ōmaha River

- Mouth of the Ōmaha River Ōmaha River (New Zealand)
- Route of the Ōmaha River

Location
- Country: New Zealand
- Region: Auckland Region

Physical characteristics
- Source
  - coordinates: 36.3359°S 174.7199°E
- Mouth: Whangateau Harbour
  - coordinates: 36.31573°S 174.75706°E
- Length: 7 km (4 mi)

Basin features
- Progression: Ōmaha River → Whangateau Harbour → Hauraki Gulf / Tīkapa Moana
- Tributaries
  - left: Tamahunga Stream

The Ōmaha River is a river of the Auckland Region of New Zealand's North Island. It flows south to reach the Pacific Ocean at the western end of Whangateau Harbour, 3 kilometres (2 mi) west of Ōmaha.

== See also ==
- List of rivers of New Zealand
