= Ōmaha =

Locality in Auckland Region, New Zealand

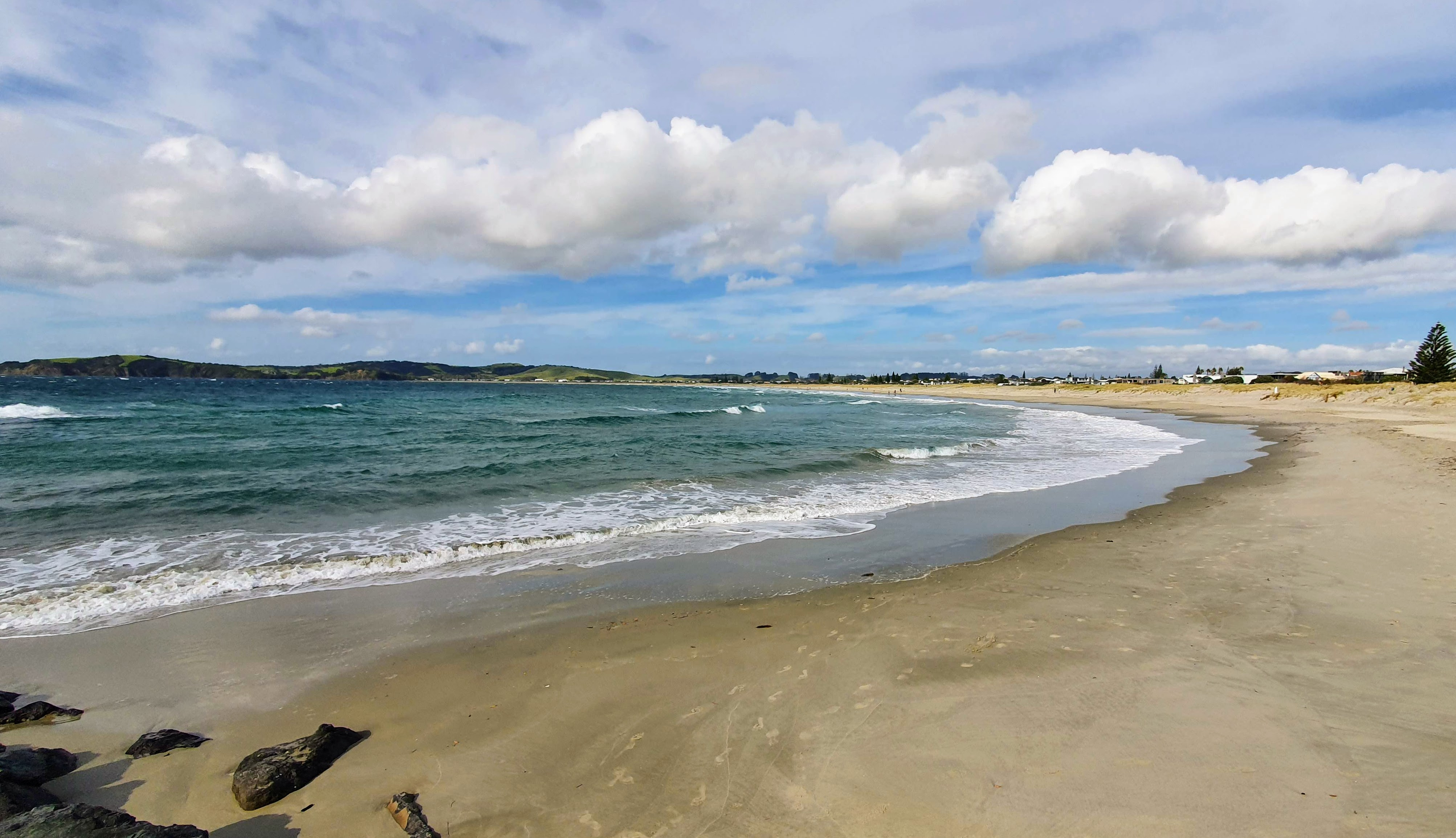
- Ōmaha Beach in mid-summer
- Interactive map of Ōmaha
- Coordinates: 36.335°S 174.780°E
- Country: New Zealand
- Region: Auckland Region
- Ward: Rodney ward
- Community board: Rodney Local Board
- Subdivision: Warkworth subdivision
- Electorates: Kaipara ki Mahurangi; Te Tai Tokerau

Government
  - Territorial authority: Auckland Council
  - Mayor of Auckland: Wayne Brown
  - Kaipara ki Mahurangi MP: Chris Penk
  - Te Tai Tokerau MP: Mariameno Kapa-Kingi

Area
  - Total: 4.85 km^{2} (1.87 sq mi)

Population (June 2025)
  - Total: 740
  - Density: 150/km^{2} (400/sq mi)

Ōmaha is a beach settlement on Ōmaha Bay in the Auckland Region, in the north of New Zealand. It is on a sandspit that adjoins Tāwharanui Peninsula and separates Whangateau Harbour from Ōmaha Bay.

== History ==
Ōmaha means 'place of pleasure' in the Māori language.

Settlement began in the 1970s when a causeway and bridge to Ōmaha were constructed by Broadlands Properties, who then subdivided the land and built housing. By 1982 the first houses and roads were finished. Development of the southern part of Omaha began in the 2000s.

To prevent erosion a wooden barrier was constructed. Despite these efforts, on 19 July 1978 a strong storm destroyed the barrier and caused damage to several beachfront properties. To solve the issue of erosion and flooding with high tides, three groynes were constructed to divert currents from Ōmaha. Alongside these groynes the harbour would be dredged with sand taken to the beach.

Following the work to protect the foreshore more building permits were permitted; however, most came with a caveat requiring them to be raised slightly above the ground.

== Geography ==
The sandspit of Ōmaha was formed during the last glacial period, approximately 5000 to 6000 years BP. The beach sediment composition is over 70% quartz sand, which gifted Ōmaha the natural "white" appearance. There are three artificial groynes had been placed at northern part of the sandspit, to accumulate sediment from longshore drift. Local council in last two decades had been placing various groups of plant to stabilize the dunes, including Spinifex, pingao, iceplant and marram grass.

Ōmaha Spit was identified by the Department of Conservation as a significant breeding site for the endangered New Zealand dotterel. The Omaha Shorebird Protection Trust was established in 2009 to monitor the dotterel population at Ōmaha. Fundraising of $162,000 by the Trust saw construction of a predator-proof fence completed in August 2012 helping to protect the birds, their chicks and eggs from predation by cats, rats, stoats, weasels and hedgehogs.

Omaha and Point Wells are the densest settlements in the Whangateau catchment area. Omaha has minimal civic and community infrastructure (churches, schools etc.) with a large number of holiday homes (baches). From 2018 it has been served by seven buses a day to Warkworth.

== Demographics ==
In the early 1980s the population was less than 100. By the start of the 1990s it had increased to 300.

Statistics New Zealand describes Ōmaha as a rural settlement, which covers 4.85 km^{2} (1.87 sq mi) and had an estimated population of 740 as of June 2025, with a population density of 153 people per km^{2}. Ōmaha is part of the larger Tawharanui Peninsula statistical area.

Historical population
| Year | Pop. | ±% p.a. |
|---|---|---|
| 2006 | 420 | — |
| 2013 | 624 | +5.82% |
| 2018 | 753 | +3.83% |
| 2023 | 744 | −0.24% |

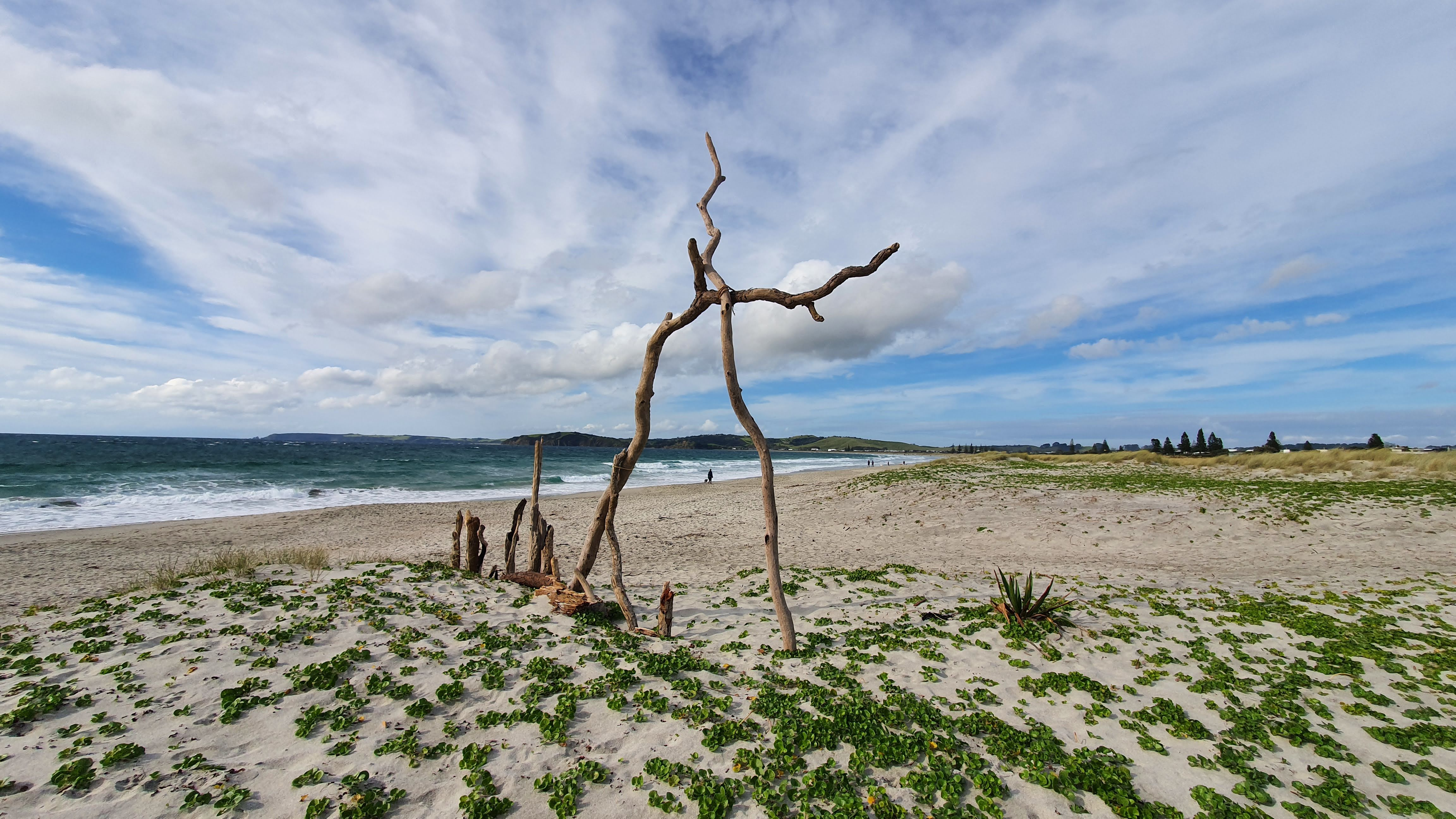
Windswept Ōmaha beach in January

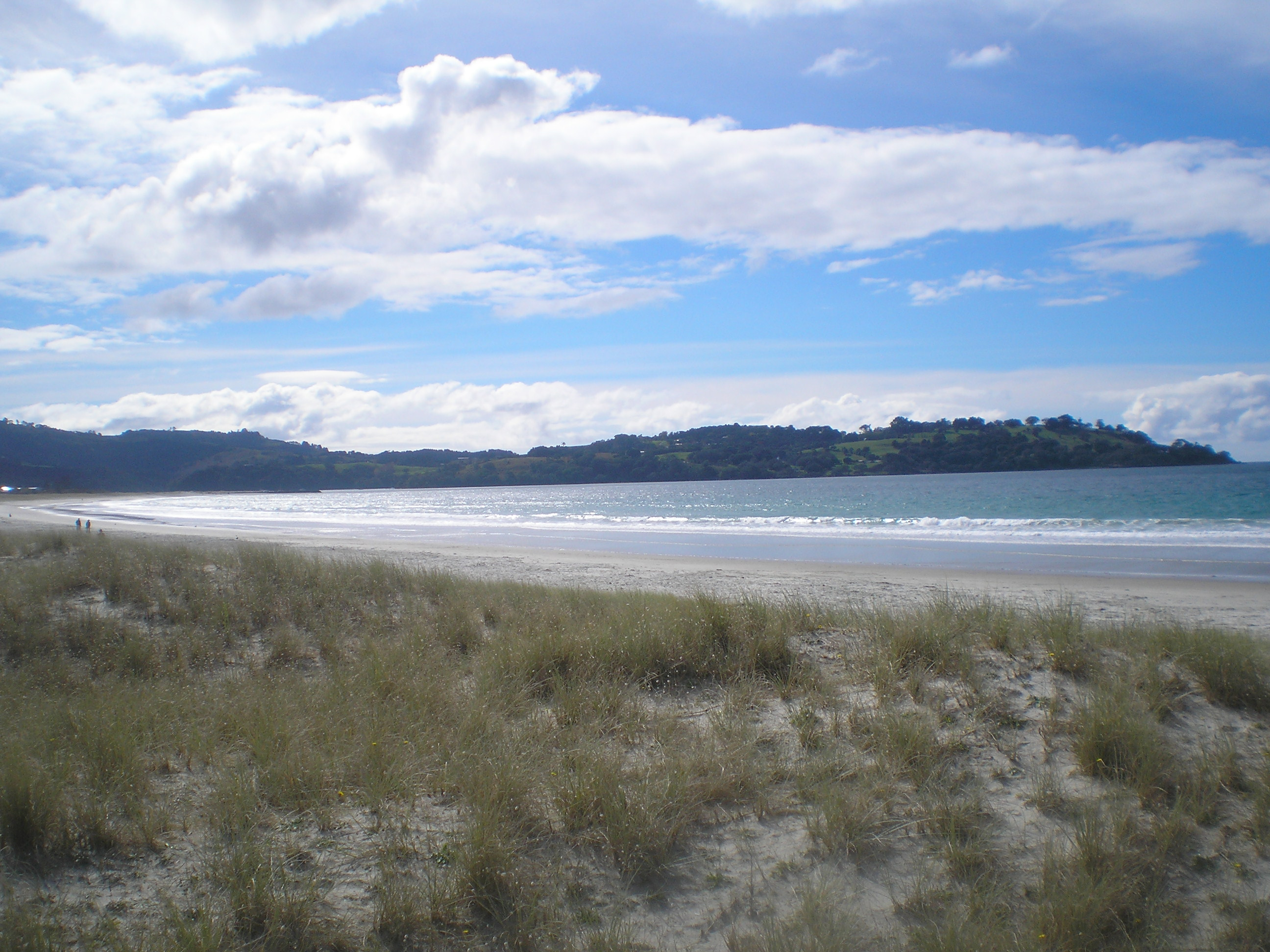
Ōmaha beach

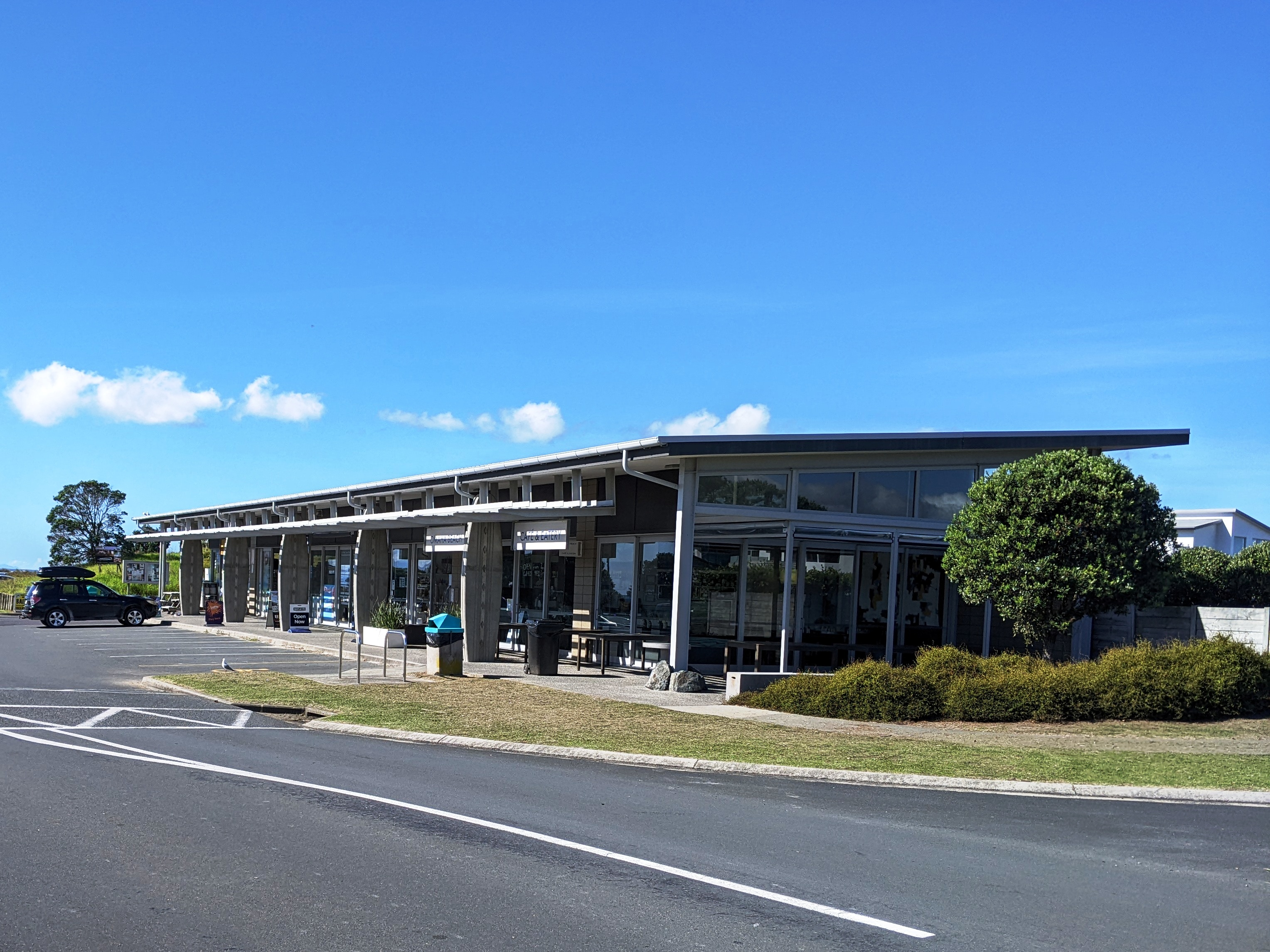
Ōmaha shopping area

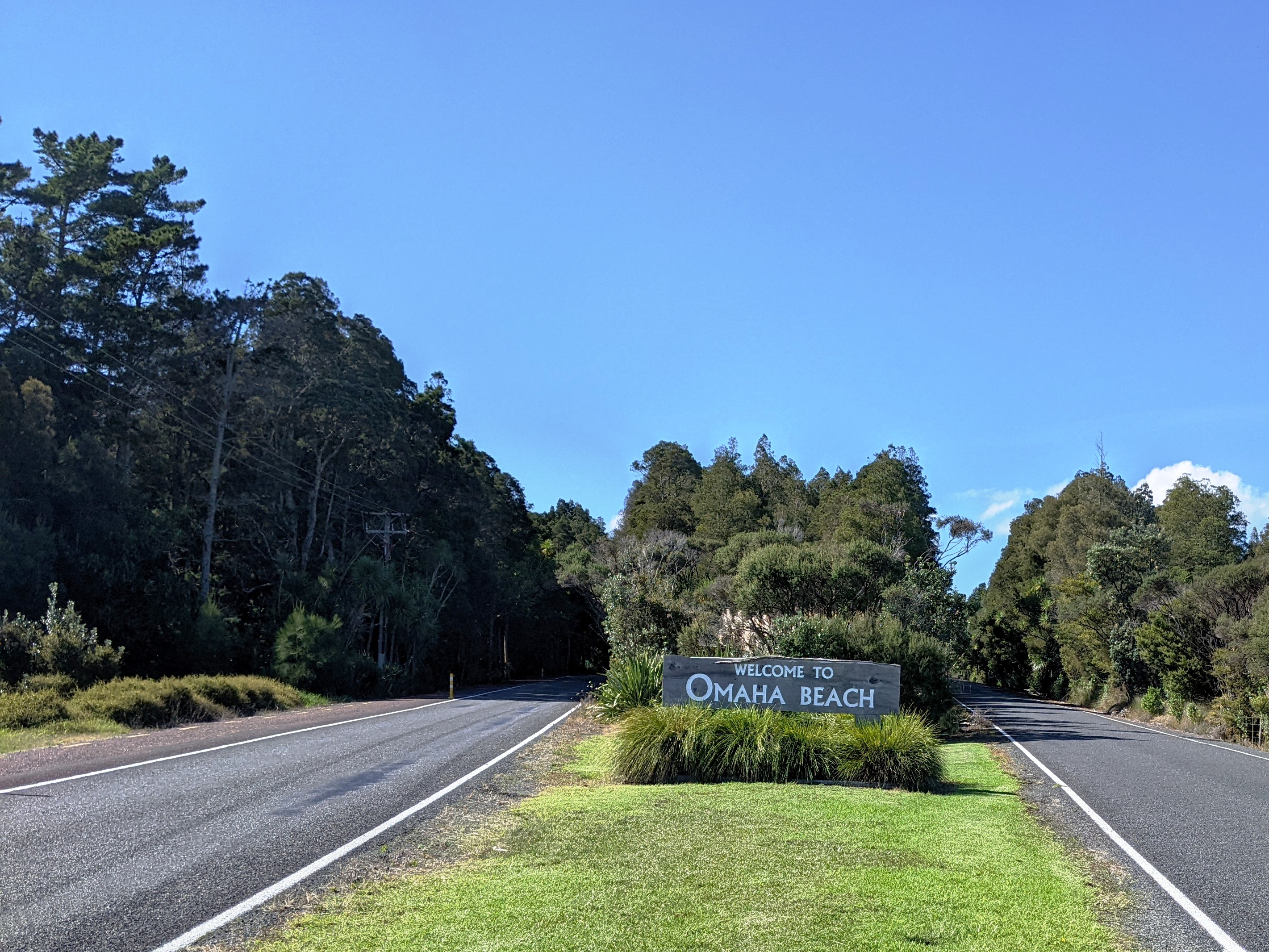
Ōmaha welcome sign

Ōmaha had a population of 744 in the 2023 New Zealand census, a decrease of 9 people (−1.2%) since the 2018 census, and an increase of 120 people (19.2%) since the 2013 census. There were 339 males and 405 females in 318 dwellings. 0.8% of people identified as LGBTIQ+. The median age was 60.7 years (compared with 38.1 years nationally). There were 87 people (11.7%) aged under 15 years, 60 (8.1%) aged 15 to 29, 297 (39.9%) aged 30 to 64, and 300 (40.3%) aged 65 or older.

People could identify as more than one ethnicity. The results were 96.4% European (Pākehā); 6.0% Māori; 2.0% Pasifika; 0.8% Asian; 0.4% Middle Eastern, Latin American and African New Zealanders (MELAA); and 2.4% other, which includes people giving their ethnicity as "New Zealander". English was spoken by 99.2%, Māori language by 0.8%, Samoan by 0.4%, and other languages by 7.3%. No language could be spoken by 0.8% (e.g. too young to talk). New Zealand Sign Language was known by 0.4%. The percentage of people born overseas was 17.3, compared with 28.8% nationally.

Religious affiliations were 34.7% Christian, and 0.8% other religions. People who answered that they had no religion were 56.5%, and 7.3% of people did not answer the census question.

Of those at least 15 years old, 141 (21.5%) people had a bachelor's or higher degree, 381 (58.0%) had a post-high school certificate or diploma, and 99 (15.1%) people exclusively held high school qualifications. The median income was $45,100, compared with $41,500 nationally. 117 people (17.8%) earned over $100,000 compared to 12.1% nationally. The employment status of those at least 15 was that 225 (34.2%) people were employed full-time, 111 (16.9%) were part-time, and 3 (0.5%) were unemployed.

== See also ==
- Matakana
