= Big Ōmaha =

Locality in Auckland Region, New Zealand

Coordinates: 36°19′20″S 174°43′51″E

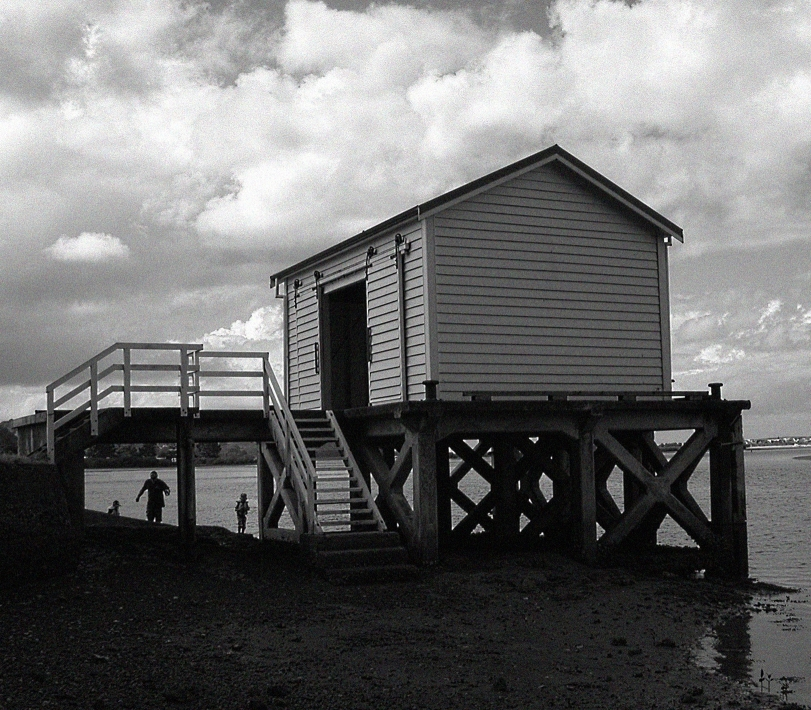
Reconstructed Big Omaha Wharf at Whangateau

Big Ōmaha is a locality of the Auckland Region, sited some 8 km southwest from Leigh.

== History ==
The Meiklejohns were the first European settlers in Big Omaha, arriving in 1858.
