= Polymastia echinus =

Scientific classification
- Domain: Eukaryota
- Kingdom: Animalia
- Phylum: Porifera
- Class: Demospongiae
- Order: Polymastiida
- Family: Polymastiidae
- Genus: Polymastia
- Species: P. echinus

Binomial name
- Polymastia echinus Kelly-Borges & Bergquist, 1997

Species of sponge

Polymastia echinus is a species of sea sponge belonging to the family Polymastiidae. It is only known from shallow subtidal habitats off Te Hāwere-a-Maki / Goat Island in the north of the North Island of New Zealand.

This is an encrusting sponge with an extraordinary appearance. The sponge is always largely covered in sand, grit and fragments of shells apart from smooth, cylindrical, peach-coloured papillae up to 15 mm in height which are always free of such material. The specific name refers to this rather hedgehog-like appearance.
