= John Morton (zoologist) =

New Zealand zoologist (1923–2011)

John Morton QSO
- Born: John Edward Morton; 18 July 1923; Morrinsville, New Zealand
- Died: 6 March 2011 (aged 87); Auckland, New Zealand
- Education: Auckland University College; University of London
- Scientific career
- Fields: biology, conservation, marine biology, theology

John Edward Morton QSO FRSNZ FLS (18 July 1923 – 6 March 2011) was a biologist, philosopher, theologian, and conservationist from New Zealand.

Morton is regarded as one of New Zealand's most respected scientists, and one of New Zealand's greatest marine biologists, researching New Zealand's ecology and marine life.

He was the first chair of the School of Zoology and Biological Sciences at the University of Auckland, a position he held for 28 years from 1959 to 1988; and published more than one hundred scientific papers and theological works in a career of over 50 years of scientific research.

He was deeply interested in the much wider fields of natural history and philosophy; was a noted theologian; and political and conservation activist.

He authored numerous books, papers, and newspaper columns across a wide variety of topics; and was also the presenter of the imported nature and science television programme, Our World.

== Early life ==
Morton was born in Morrinsville in 1923. His family used to holiday at Milford Beach, where began his lifelong interest in the seashore and natural history. He attended Morrinsville College, completing high school as dux in 1940.

== Career ==
=== Biologist ===
Morton enrolled at Auckland University College in 1942, shortly before his eighteenth birthday, and graduated with a Bachelor of Science degree in zoology in 1945.

He continued at Auckland University researching a range of molluscan taxa until he moved to the United Kingdom in 1950 under a Dominian and Colonial Scholarship to undertake doctoral research at the University of London under the supervision of Alastair Graham, working from Plymouth on the evolution of marine pulmonates of the family Ellobiidae. He remained at the university of London lecturing and studying molluscs until 1959.

This period was the most productive decade of his working life as a biologist in terms of the volume of his output, during which he published 33 papers (31 of them sole-authored) and his first book, Molluscs (1958), which stayed in print for over 20 years over nine editions.

The 1950s established his international reputation in malacology.

Morton returned to New Zealand in 1960, having been appointed the first chair of the School of Zoology and Biological Sciences at the University of Auckland, a position he held for 28 years from 1959 to 1988. The then vice-chancellor, Kenneth Maidment, said “'Morton, we’ve brought you here to build up a good zoology department—world standard. Don’t worry about the money—we’ll see you get what you need.'”

In the early 1960s, Morton, with Val Chapman, was instrumental in founding the Leigh Marine Biology Laboratory, which opened in 1964.

In 1965, at the request of the Royal Society, Morton lead the marine party of the Royal Society’s Expedition to the British Solomon Islands.

In 1968 Morton and Michael Miller published The New Zealand Sea Shore, an authoritative “classic” work on New Zealand’s littoral zone. It is considered the foundation on which all New Zealand’s marine biology has been built, with Professor Bill Ballantine describing it as, “It is still the best single book on seashores in the world.”

Morton’s continuing interest in the Pacific lead to substantial research in Fiji, Samoa, Cook Islands, New Caledonia and Papua New Guinea.

In 1974 he was Royal Society Visiting Professor in Zoology in Hong Kong, which led to the production in 1983, with Professor Brian Morton, of The Sea Shore Ecology of Hong Kong.

In 1977 he was appointed visiting professor at St Andrew’s University, New Brunswick, Canada and taught and researched at Vancouver Island, and on the Atlantic shores of Canada.

He was considered at this time one of New Zealand's most talented up-and-coming academics, and was later regarded by many as one of New Zealand's greatest marine biologists.

His teaching style and influence have been well-documented in A History of Biology at Auckland University 1883–1983. He believed in "humanising" complex scientific issues, and presenting them in laymen's language.

In 2004 he published Seashore ecology of New Zealand and the Pacific, the culmination of his life’s work as a biologist.

=== Theologian ===
Morton was regarded as one of New Zealand's leading Christian academics. He was Lay Canon of Holy Trinity Cathedral, Auckland; Fellow St. John’s Theological College, Auckland and sat for more than 20 years on the General Synod of the New Zealand Anglican Church. At his funeral eulogy, Bishop John Paterson told mourners that Morton’s knowledge of theology was highly respected in the Anglican Church.

Morton believed in a unified view of science and religion. He told The New Zealand Herald upon his retirement in 1988 that "I find that my scientific work has confirmed my Christian convictions. To me biology and theology complement each other."

In his 1984 book Redeeming Creation he acknowledged the influence of the French palaeontologist Teilhard de Chardin in forming the teleological view he expounded in his academic life.

Morton’s theological works include Man, Science and God (1972); Redeeming Creation (1984); and Christ, Creation and the Environment (1989).

=== Conservationist ===
Morton did much for conservation in New Zealand. In 1975, he was a leader in the establishment of New Zealand's first marine reserve, Cape Rodney-Okakari Point Marine Reserve (which is near Cape Rodney and Leigh and includes Te Hāwere-a-Maki / Goat Island). He led the conservation movement to a series of victories in the 1970s and 1980s, which saved the last of New Zealand's mainland native forests, Pureora, Whirinaki, Waitututu and South Westland from logging.

In 1980, for his conservation work, he was made a Companion in New Zealand’s Queen’s Service Order.

In 2000 he was awarded the Biodiversity Accolade from the Minister of Conservation for his outstanding and sustained contributions towards conserving New Zealand’s unique plants and animals and the places where they live.

Notable conservation works include Seacoast in the Seventies - The Future of the New Zealand Shoreline (1973) and The future of New Zealand conservation: Ethics and Politics (1995).

=== Politician ===
Morton served on the Auckland Regional Authority from 1971 to 1974 for Takapuna, losing his re-election bid after switching his party affiliation to Labour. In 1989 he became a founding member of the New Labour Party, which in 1991 formed a coalition with other parties called the Alliance.

== Honours and awards ==
- Fellow of the Royal Society of New Zealand (1969)
- Honorary Fellow of Linnean Society of London (HonFLS)
- Companion of the Queen's Service Order for public services in the 1986 Queen's Birthday Honours
- Winner of Wattie Book of the Year 1968, for The New Zealand sea shore, together with Michael C. Miller
- In 1965, malacologist Winston Ponder named the gastropod species Eatoniella mortoni after Morton.
- Patron Conchology Section Auckland Museum Institute
- Chairman, Whirinaki Forest Promotion Trust
- Chairman, Forest and Bird Protection Society

== Influence and Legacy ==
Bill Ballantine said of Morton: “There are not too many shore ecologists who have saved forests, significantly advanced the cause of women’s equality, articulated considered positions on the centrality of God in the cosmos and on free public transport, and who can write speeches in Latin.”

Morton is honoured by the NZ Marine Sciences Society’s Professor John Morton Award.

Morton had a significant influence on many people across wide fields including:

- Professor Bill Ballantine, Morton’s first PhD student and winner of the 1996 Goldman Environmental Prize for his promotion of marine reserves.
- Dame Patricia Bergquist, the first person to earn a doctoral degree in zoology from the University of Auckland, and whose PhD Morton supervised. Bergquist later became Professor of Zoology at Auckland University.
- John Croxall, who completed a PhD at the University of Auckland in 1971, on ascidian ecology, supervised by Morton, who went on to be Head of Conservation Biology at the British Antarctic Survey.
- Dr Rodney Phillips Dales, who met Morton at Queen Mary College, and became life-long friends with Morton.
- Brian Arthur Foster, Associate Professor of Zoology.
- Dr Dennis Preston Gordon, former student, and senior scientist at the National Institute of Water and Atmospheric Research.
- Jeremy Griffith, Australian biologist, whose work Morton compared to that of Teilhard de Chardin, launching one of Griffith’s books in New Zealand in 1992, and commending his 2003 book A Species In Denial as “superb”.
- Professor John C. Montgomery, Institute of Marine Science, University of Auckland, for whom Morton sparked “a purpose and goal”.
- Kennedy P. Warne, former student, founding editor of New Zealand Geographic.

== Selected bibliography ==
- Seashore ecology of New Zealand and the Pacific. John Edward Morton, Bruce William Hayward. Bateman, 2004. ISBN 1-86953-399-2, ISBN 978-1-86953-399-1.
- The shore ecology of Upolu – Western Samoa. Issue 31 of Leigh Lab. bulletin. John Edward Morton, Andrew Jeffs, Leigh Marine Laboratory. University of Auckland, 1993.
- Shore life between Fundy tides. John Edward Morton, J. C. Roff, Mary Beverley-Burton. Canadian Scholars Press, 1991.
- The shore ecology of the tropical Pacific. John Edward Morton. Unesco Regional Office for Science and Technology for South-East Asia, 1990.
- Christ, creation, and the environment. John Edward Morton. Anglican Communications, 1989. ISBN 0-473-00828-9, ISBN 978-0-473-00828-4.
- Marine molluscs: Opisthobranchia, Part 2. Richard Carden Willan, John Edward Morton, John Walsby, Leigh Marine Laboratory, University of Auckland, 1984.
- The sea shore ecology of Hong Kong. Brian Morton, John Edward Morton. The University of Hong Kong, 1983. ISBN 962-209-027-3.
- Marine molluscs: Amphineura, archaeogastropoda & pulmonata, Part 1. Issue 4 of Leigh Lab. bulletin. John Walsby, John Edward Morton, Leigh Marine Laboratory, University of Auckland, 1982.
- Molluscs. John Edward Morton. Hutchinson University Library, 1979.
- Seacoast in the seventies: the future of the New Zealand shoreline. John Edward Morton, David A. Thom, Ronald Harry Locker. Hodder and Stoughton, 1973.
- Man, science and God. John Edward Morton. Collins, 1972.
- The New Zealand sea shore. John Edward Morton, Michael C. Miller. Collins, 1968.
