= Polymastia umbraculum =

Scientific classification
- Kingdom: Animalia
- Phylum: Porifera
- Class: Demospongiae
- Order: Polymastiida
- Family: Polymastiidae
- Genus: Polymastia
- Species: P. umbraculum

Binomial name
- Polymastia umbraculum Kelly-Borges & Bergquist, 1997

Species of sponge

Polymastia umbraculum is a species of sea sponge belonging to the family Polymastiidae. It is only known from rocky subtidal habitats around Kawau Island off the North Island of New Zealand.

This is a thickly encrusting sponge with a very firm texture, growing in loosely attached patches up to 7 cm across. The granular outer layer is brilliant yellow-orange with a rather darker interior carrying many symbiont foraminifera. It is often infested with the parasitic amphipod Polycheria antarctica.
