= Polymastia crocea =

Scientific classification
- Domain: Eukaryota
- Kingdom: Animalia
- Phylum: Porifera
- Class: Demospongiae
- Order: Polymastiida
- Family: Polymastiidae
- Genus: Polymastia
- Species: P. crocea

Binomial name
- Polymastia crocea Kelly-Borges & Bergquist, 1997

Species of sponge

Polymastia crocea is a species of sea sponge belonging to the family Polymastiidae. It is found in subtidal habitats below 6 m depth in the far north of the North Island of New Zealand.

This is a globular sponge up to 4 cm across or an encrusting sponge up to 7 cm across. This soft-textured sponge is very bright yellow outside and in with the surface covered in small papillae, some with pores, some without. This sponge is frequently infested with the parasitic amphipod Polycheria antarctica. At least three species of symbiont foraminifera are found within this sponge.
