= Proteleia tapetum =

Scientific classification
- Domain: Eukaryota
- Kingdom: Animalia
- Phylum: Porifera
- Class: Demospongiae
- Order: Polymastiida
- Family: Polymastiidae
- Genus: Proteleia
- Species: P. tapetum

Binomial name
- Proteleia tapetum Kelly-Borges & Bergquist, 1997

Synonyms
- Polymastia tapetum Kelly-Borges & Bergquist, 1997

Species of sponge

Proteleia tapetum is a species of sea sponge belonging to the family Polymastiidae. It is found in shallow subtidal and intertidal habitats in the far north of North Island, New Zealand.

This is an encrusting sponge growing in patches up to 60 cm across. The outer layer is bright yellow or orange with a darker interior. The whole surface is thickly covered in smooth triangular papillae up to 15 mm in height. As this sponge is commonly covered in silt, the papillae are often the only part of the animal visible.
