= Polymastia rubens =

Scientific classification
- Domain: Eukaryota
- Kingdom: Animalia
- Phylum: Porifera
- Class: Demospongiae
- Order: Polymastiida
- Family: Polymastiidae
- Genus: Polymastia
- Species: P. rubens

Binomial name
- Polymastia rubens Kelly-Borges & Bergquist, 1997

Species of sponge

Polymastia rubens is a species of sea sponge belonging to the family Polymastiidae. It is only known from rocky subtidal habitats around Kawau Island off North Island, New Zealand.

This is an encrusting sponge with a very firm texture, growing in patches up to 7 cm across. The outer layer is bright red with a brown interior. The surface is smooth apart from small wart-like papillae.
