= Polymastia lorum =

Scientific classification
- Domain: Eukaryota
- Kingdom: Animalia
- Phylum: Porifera
- Class: Demospongiae
- Order: Polymastiida
- Family: Polymastiidae
- Genus: Polymastia
- Species: P. lorum

Binomial name
- Polymastia lorum Kelly-Borges & Bergquist, 1997

Species of sponge

Polymastia lorum is a species of sea sponge belonging to the family Polymastiidae. It is only known from a single specimen found attached to a dead Glycimeris valve on a reef near Ohinau Island, one of the Mercury Islands off North Island, New Zealand.

This is a small encrusting sponge 4 cm across. The outer layer is yellow with an orange-red interior. The most remarkable feature of this sponge is its incredibly long (up to 6 cm) strap-like papillae.
