= Polymastia pepo =

Scientific classification
- Domain: Eukaryota
- Kingdom: Animalia
- Phylum: Porifera
- Class: Demospongiae
- Order: Polymastiida
- Family: Polymastiidae
- Genus: Polymastia
- Species: P. pepo

Binomial name
- Polymastia pepo Kelly-Borges & Bergquist, 1997

Species of sponge

Polymastia pepo is a species of sea sponge belonging to the family Polymastiidae. It is a common species of rocky subtidal and intertidal habitats in the far north of North Island, New Zealand.

This is a large, often spherical sponge up to 40 cm in diameter. It is firm and bright orange and rather resembles a pumpkin (hence the specific name: "pepo" is Latin for "pumpkin").
