= Atergia villosa =

Scientific classification
- Kingdom: Animalia
- Phylum: Porifera
- Class: Demospongiae
- Order: Polymastiida
- Family: Polymastiidae
- Genus: Atergia
- Species: A. villosa

Binomial name
- Atergia villosa (Kelly-Borges & Bergquist, 1997)

Synonyms
- Tylexocladus villosus Kelly-Borges & Bergquist, 1997

Species of sponge

Atergia villosa is a species of sea sponge belonging to the family Polymastiidae. It is found in rocky deep-sea habitats around the Chatham Islands, New Zealand.

This is a round, yellow, velvety-soft sponge up to 3 cm across. It is usually found attached to a scallop shell.
