= Acanthopolymastia bathamae =

Scientific classification
- Kingdom: Animalia
- Phylum: Porifera
- Class: Demospongiae
- Order: Polymastiida
- Family: Polymastiidae
- Genus: Acanthopolymastia
- Species: A. bathamae

Binomial name
- Acanthopolymastia bathamae Kelly-Borges & Bergquist, 1997
- Holotype site: (SAMAN1988336) Two Wells, South Australia

Species of sponge

Acanthopolymastia bathamae is a species of sea sponge belonging to the family Polymastiidae. It is only known from the Papanui Submarine Canyon off Dunedin, South Island, New Zealand.

This is a small, cream-coloured hemispherical sponge up to 8 mm in diameter. Its texture is soft and velvety with a single central papilla up to 7 mm in height.
