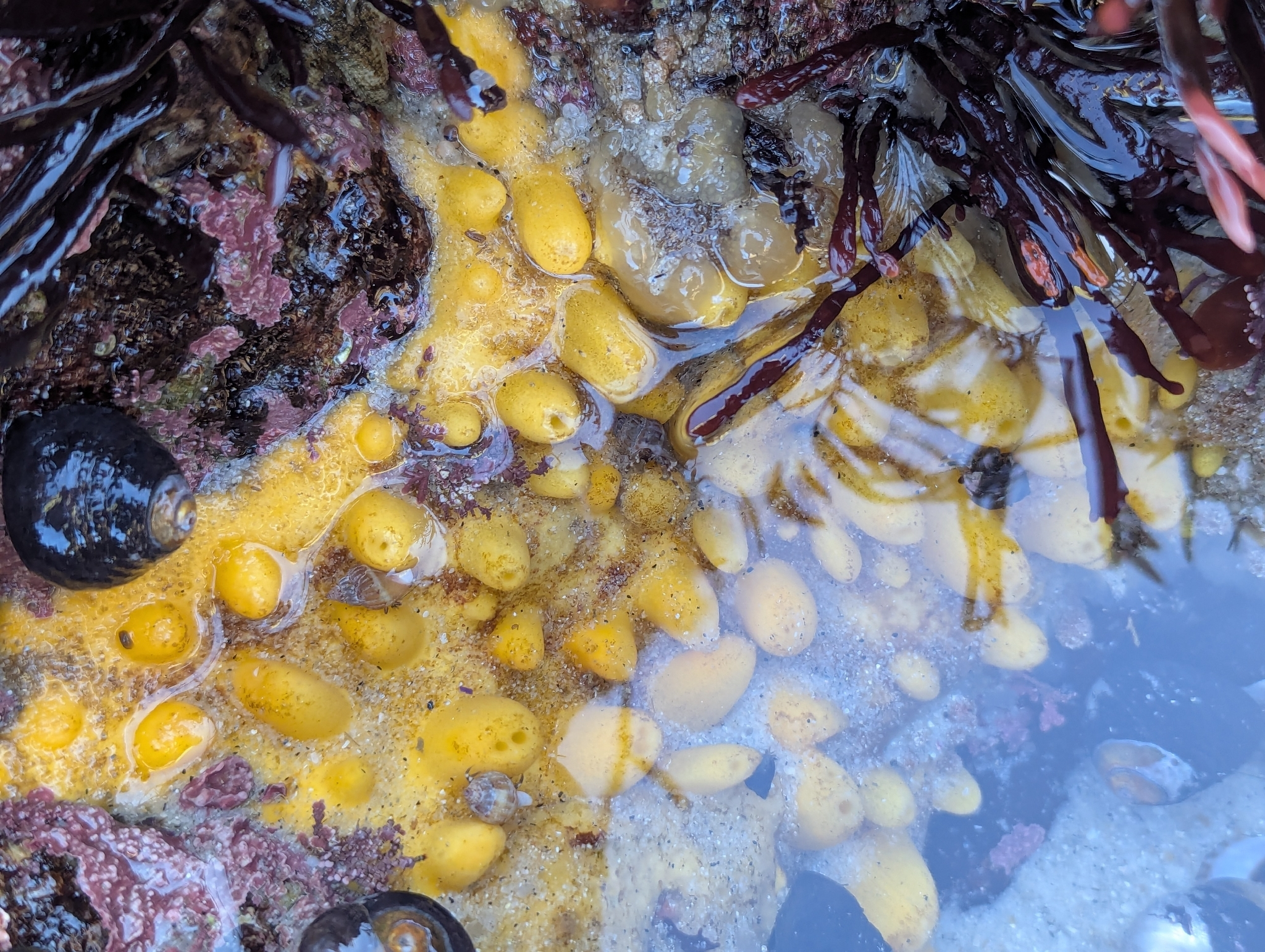

Scientific classification
- Kingdom: Animalia
- Phylum: Porifera
- Class: Demospongiae
- Order: Polymastiida
- Family: Polymastiidae
- Genus: Polymastia
- Species: P. pachymastia

Binomial name
- Polymastia pachymastia de Laubenfels, 1932

= Polymastia pachymastia =

Species of sponge

Polymastia pachymastia is a species of sponge belonging to the family Polymastiidae. It is found in the intertidal and subtidal waters of the north Pacific Ocean, from the Aleutian Islands to Southern California, up to depths of 55 meters.

== Description ==
Polymastia pachymastia is a white or dark yellow encrusting sponge with a smooth surface and a total diameter ranging from 2.5 cm to 1 m. The basal crust is often hidden by detritus. In areas of high wave action, the sponge grows in a corrugated form, but in more protected environments, it will grow teat-shaped papillae, giving rise to the common name, the aggregated nipple sponge. Each papilla is hollow and conical with an osculum at the tip, and can extend up to 2 cm in height. The papilla are generally shorter and less pointed than those of other species in the genus.

== Ecology ==
Like all Polymastia species, the aggregated nipple sponge produces small amphiblastula, or hollow, oval-shaped swimming larva. These later settle and become adult sponges.

== Discovery ==
Polymastia pachymastia was first described from Point Lobos, California by Max Walker de Laubenfels, an American spongiologist. He collected the holotype on July 12, 1930. Before this, on August 20, 1929, a fisherman had collected a specimen while trawling near Point Sur.

== Etymology ==
The specific Latin epithet comes from the Greek παχύς (meaning thick) and μαστός (meaning breast).
