= Polymastia aurantia =

Scientific classification
- Domain: Eukaryota
- Kingdom: Animalia
- Phylum: Porifera
- Class: Demospongiae
- Order: Polymastiida
- Family: Polymastiidae
- Genus: Polymastia
- Species: P. aurantia

Binomial name
- Polymastia aurantia Kelly-Borges & Bergquist, 1997

Species of sponge

Polymastia aurantia is a species of sea sponge belonging to the family Polymastiidae. It is found in intertidal habitats including tide pools in the vicinity of Auckland, New Zealand.

This is a thickly encrusting sponge with a soft, fleshy texture, growing in patches up to 18 cm across. The outer layer is bright orange with a yellowish-brown interior. The surface is marked with widely spaced papillae: When the sponge is in a location affected by wave action, the papillae are located on distinct lamellae running in a single direction over the whole surface of the sponge.
