= Polymastia fusca =

Scientific classification
- Domain: Eukaryota
- Kingdom: Animalia
- Phylum: Porifera
- Class: Demospongiae
- Order: Polymastiida
- Family: Polymastiidae
- Genus: Polymastia
- Species: P. fusca

Binomial name
- Polymastia fusca Bergquist, 1961

Species of sponge

Polymastia fusca is a species of sea sponge belonging to the family Polymastiidae. It is found in shallow subtidal habitats in the far north of North Island, New Zealand.

This firm-textured sponge grows up to 20 cm across, often encrusting its substrate. The outer layer is very dark brown, contrasting with a much paler yellow or orange interior. The whole surface is covered in papillae, those at the centre markedly taller than those at the periphery.
