= Polymastia hirsuta =

Scientific classification
- Domain: Eukaryota
- Kingdom: Animalia
- Phylum: Porifera
- Class: Demospongiae
- Order: Polymastiida
- Family: Polymastiidae
- Genus: Polymastia
- Species: P. hirsuta

Binomial name
- Polymastia hirsuta Bergquist, 1968

Species of sponge

Polymastia hirsuta is a species of sea sponge belonging to the family Polymastiidae. It is found in various subtidal habitats in the far north of North Island, New Zealand.

This is a usually circular sponge up to 7 cm in diameter. This rather distinctive species is generally brown and silt-covered but with prominent papillae appearing as bright yellow, silt-free lumps over the whole surface.
