= Edith Winstone Blackwell =

New Zealand philanthropist

Edith Mary Winstone Blackwell MBE (née Winstone, 28 July 1877 – 15 September 1956) was a New Zealand philanthropist. Her philanthropic activities were concentrated in Auckland, New Zealand during the first half of the 20th century.

== Early life and family ==
Born Edith Mary Winstone on 28 July 1877, Blackwell was the only daughter of George and Mary Elizabeth Winstone. She attended the Beresford Street Public School before becoming one of the first girls to attend Auckland Grammar School in Symonds Street. In 1932, she married Joseph Henry Blackwell. Following a time in Kaiapoi they returned to Auckland, building "Marewa", a fine home on the north-eastern slopes of Mount Eden with gardens spreading down the hillside.

== Philanthropy and legacy ==
In 1950, Edith Blackwell established a charitable trust—the Edith Winstone Blackwell Foundation–that was incorporated in 1956. A Trust Board appointed to run the trust included a representative of the descendants of each of her brothers. Blackwell donated a Zeiss telescope to the Stardome Observatory. The primary fixed telescope at Stardome Observatory is named after her.

In the 1954 Queen's Birthday Honours, Blackwell was appointed a Member of the Order of the British Empire, for social welfare and philanthropic services; her investiture was performed at Government House, Auckland on 25 February 1955 by the governor-general, Sir Willoughby Norrie. She died on 15 September 1956.

The Edith Winstone Blackwell Case Room in the Owen G Glenn Building at the University of Auckland is named after her.

In 2008, the University of Auckland launched a fundraising campaign to redevelop the Leigh Marine Laboratory at Goat Island as the base for the South Pacific Centre for Marine Science - with a $4.5 million donation from the Edith Winstone Blackwell Foundation. In 2011, the Edith Winstone Blackwell Interpretive Centre opened.

== See also ==
- Stardome Observatory
