= P. aurantium =

P. aurantium may refer to:

- Philautus aurantium, a frog species
- Polymastia aurantium, a sponge species

== See also ==
- Aurantium
