= Acanthopolymastia acanthoxa =

Scientific classification
- Kingdom: Animalia
- Phylum: Porifera
- Class: Demospongiae
- Order: Polymastiida
- Family: Polymastiidae
- Genus: Acanthopolymastia
- Species: A. acanthoxa

Binomial name
- Acanthopolymastia acanthoxa (Koltun, 1964)

Synonyms
- Atergia acanthoxa Koltun, 1964

Species of sponge

Acanthopolymastia acanthoxa is a species of sea sponge belonging to the family Polymastiidae. It is a deep-ocean species found on muddy substrates at depths of over 3000 m in the Ross Sea, Antarctica.

This is a brown cushion-shaped sponge up to 4 cm across with a lateral fringe and a single papilla with a terminal opening.
