= Polymastia bouryesnaultae =

Scientific classification
- Domain: Eukaryota
- Kingdom: Animalia
- Phylum: Porifera
- Class: Demospongiae
- Order: Polymastiida
- Family: Polymastiidae
- Genus: Polymastia
- Species: P. bouryesnaultae

Binomial name
- Polymastia bouryesnaultae Samaai & Gibbons, 2005

Species of sponge from southern Africa

Polymastia bouryesnaultae, the knobbly sponge, is a small and cryptic species of demosponge from South Africa and Namibia.

== Description ==
Although the holotype of this species was collected in 1999, it was not described until 2005.

It has a thickly encrusting to semi-spherical form and is firm and tough. It grows up to 50 mm (2.0 in) long and 40 mm (1.6 in) wide. The fuzzy brown surface has numerous pale yellow to light brown smooth, tapering projections (papillae). The papillae are various sizes, growing up to 10 mm (0.39 in) high and 2 mm (0.079 in) wide. The oscules are not visible.

=== Spicules ===
This sponge only has megascleres, no microscleres. The following megascleres are present:

- Subtylostyles are the primary megascleres. They are smooth, straight and spindle-shaped, becoming narrowest at the outer end of the spicule. They are thickest at the center.
- Intermediate subtylostyles resemble the primary megascleres but are notably smaller.
- Dermal tylostyles are rounded at the base and pointed at the outer end.
- Longer tylostyles tapering gradually towards the end.

=== Skeleton ===
The choanosomal skeleton is made of well-formed tracts of megascleres. They run vertically from the base, expanding into brushes of large spicules whose tips penetrate beyond the cortex. Ectosomal and intermediate size spicules occur randomly in the choanosome.

The cortex is separated from the choanosome by a cavernous boundary that is not entirely free of spicules. The cortex is very dense. It is made of small, straight tylostyles which are tightly packed with their points directed outwards, projecting beyond the surface of the sponge. Larger, stout tylostyles are embedded just below this dense layer and project past these points.

== Distribution and habitat ==
This species is known from the south and west coasts of South Africa and the coast of Namibia. It is found on rocky boulders at depths of 18–70 m (59–230 ft). It is usually found in association with other sponges.
