= Trichostemma =

Trichostemma is an unaccepted scientific name and may refer to two different genera:

- Polymastia (sponge), genus of sea sponges
- Wedelia, a genus of sunflowers
