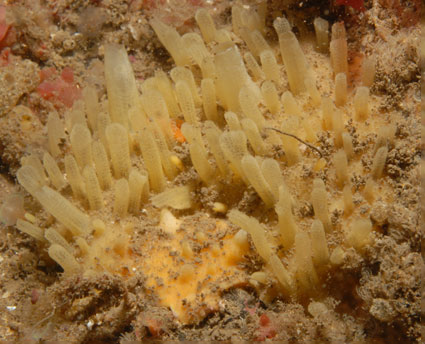

Scientific classification
- Kingdom: Animalia
- Phylum: Porifera
- Class: Demospongiae
- Order: Polymastiida
- Family: Polymastiidae
- Genus: Polymastia
- Species: P. penicillus

Binomial name
- Polymastia penicillus (Montagu, 1814)

Synonyms
- Euplectella mammillaris (Mueller, 1806); Spongia imperati Della Chiaje, 1828; Spongia mamifferis Parkinson, 1822; Spongia penicillus Montagu, 1814; Tethya penicilliformis Gray, 1821

= Polymastia penicillus =

Species of sponge

Polymastia penicillus is a species of sponge belonging to the family Polymastiidae. It is found in shallow water in the northeastern and the northwestern Atlantic Ocean, growing on rocks in areas of high sedimentation.

== Description ==
Polymastia penicillus forms small cushions which are up to 3 cm (1.2 in) high and can grow to a diameter of 20 cm (8 in). A number of hollow, cylindrical papillae up to 3 cm (1.2 in) long project from the upper surface, with an osculum (exhalant opening) at the tip of each, and many small inhalant pores on the sides. The papillae can be retracted. This sponge is pale yellow, the papillae often being translucent or paler than the rest of the tissue. A similar species occupying the same habitat is Polymastia boletiformis, but that is a slightly darker yellow and forms a less-spreading, thicker cushion with darker papillae. Sediment is less likely to settle on the surface of P. boletiformis whereas P. penicillus often appears dirty.

== Distribution and habitat ==
Polymastia penicillus occurs in the North Atlantic Ocean, on the coasts of both North America and Western Europe, including the North Sea, the English Channel and the Mediterranean Sea. It usually occurs in the shallow subtidal zone, down to about 25 m (80 ft), but sometimes occurs at much greater depths. Its typical habitat is on rock near to sandy areas, and where there is much suspended particulate matter in the water.

== Ecology ==
As in other sponges, water is drawn through the sponge body, and bacteria and phytoplankton are filtered out, with the water exiting through the osculi. Sexual reproduction takes place during the summer, the larvae being expelled with the water current and soon settling on the seabed to become juveniles. Sponges have great regenerative powers, and asexual reproduction also occurs, with fragments of sponge that become detached settling and forming new individuals.

Polymastia penicillus has a symbiotic relationship with the bacterium Pseudovibrio sp. POLY-S9 strain. This has a very large genome, which includes several bioactive clusters of genes and many mobile DNA elements; these may enable the bacterium to survive in various hosts and habitats by exchanging genetic material.
