= Tylexocladus =

Scientific classification
- Kingdom: Animalia
- Phylum: Porifera
- Class: Demospongiae
- Order: Polymastiida
- Family: Polymastiidae
- Genus: Tylexocladus; Topsent, 1898

Species
- See text

Genus of sponges

Tylexocladus is a genus of deep-water sea sponge belonging to the family Polymastiidae. These are small rounded sponges with a bristly surface bearing one or more raised openings (known as "osculae").

== Species ==
Species include:

- Tylexocladus hispidus
- Tylexocladus joubini
