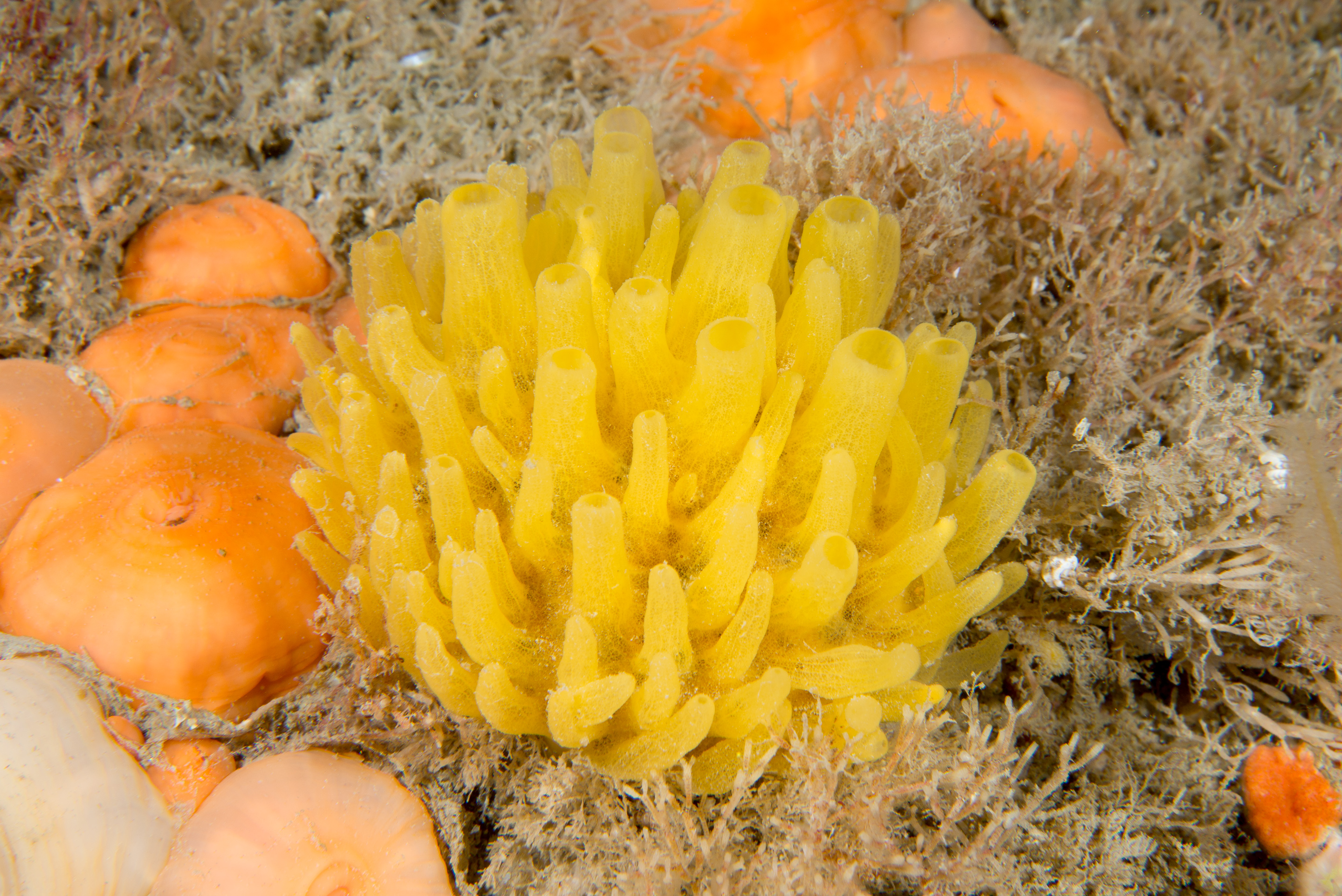

Conservation status
- Secure (NatureServe)

Scientific classification
- Kingdom: Animalia
- Phylum: Porifera
- Class: Demospongiae
- Order: Polymastiida
- Family: Polymastiidae
- Genus: Polymastia
- Species: P. boletiformis

Binomial name
- Polymastia boletiformis (Lamarck, 1815)

Synonyms
- Alcyoncellum robustum (Bowerbank, 1861); Alcyonium boletiforme Lamarck, 1815; Euplectella robusta Bowerbank, 1861; Polymastia bulbosa Bowerbank, 1866; Polymastia ornata Bowerbank, 1866; Polymastia robusta Bowerbank, 1862

= Polymastia boletiformis =

Species of sponge

Polymastia boletiformis also known as the yellow hedgehog sponge is a species of sponge belonging to the family Polymastiidae. It is found in the Arctic Ocean and on both sides of the North Atlantic Ocean.

== Description ==
Polymastia boletiformis forms small cushions or broad-based masses of tissue up to 10 cm (4 in) in diameter, adhering firmly to the substrate. A number of hollow, cylindrical papillae up to 3 cm (1.2 in) long project from the upper surface, with an osculum (exhalant opening) at the tip of each, and many small inhalant pores on the sides of the papillae. The mesohyl, a jelly-like layer in the body wall, is stiffened by mineral spicules, large and small needle-like megascleres, but there are no microscleres. The texture of this sponge is smooth and firm but supple, and the colour is yellowish-grey, yellow or orange. The papillae are contractile, and bend over if the sponge is handled; they are the same colour as the rest of the sponge, which helps distinguish this species from the rather similar Polymastia penicillus, Polymastia mamillaris and Ciocalypta penicillus.

== Distribution and habitat ==
Polymastia boletiformis occurs in temperate and cold waters in the western Atlantic Ocean, as far south as the Gulf of Maine, the Arctic Ocean and the eastern Atlantic Ocean, as far south as the Bay of Biscay; it is common in Northern France, the Netherlands and the British Isles. Its depth range is from the littoral zone, where it occurs in rock pools, down to about 30 m (100 ft) and exceptionally much deeper (2,300 m (7,500 ft)). Its typical habitat is on the top of boulders and on up-facing rocks covered with sediment, in association with a mat of bryozoans and hydroids. It is tolerant of varying salinity and sometimes occurs in estuaries.

== Ecology ==
Like other sponges, water is drawn through the sponge body, nutritious particles such as bacteria and phytoplankton are filtered out and excess water expelled through the osculi. Sexual reproduction takes place during the summer, the larvae being expelled with the water current. The dorid nudibranch Doris adrianae feeds on this sponge.

Secondary metabolites found in Polymastia boletiformis show antimicrobial activity; extracts from the sponge contain novel steroid/amino acid conjugates.
