= Cape Rodney =

Coordinates: 36.27871°S 174.82095°E

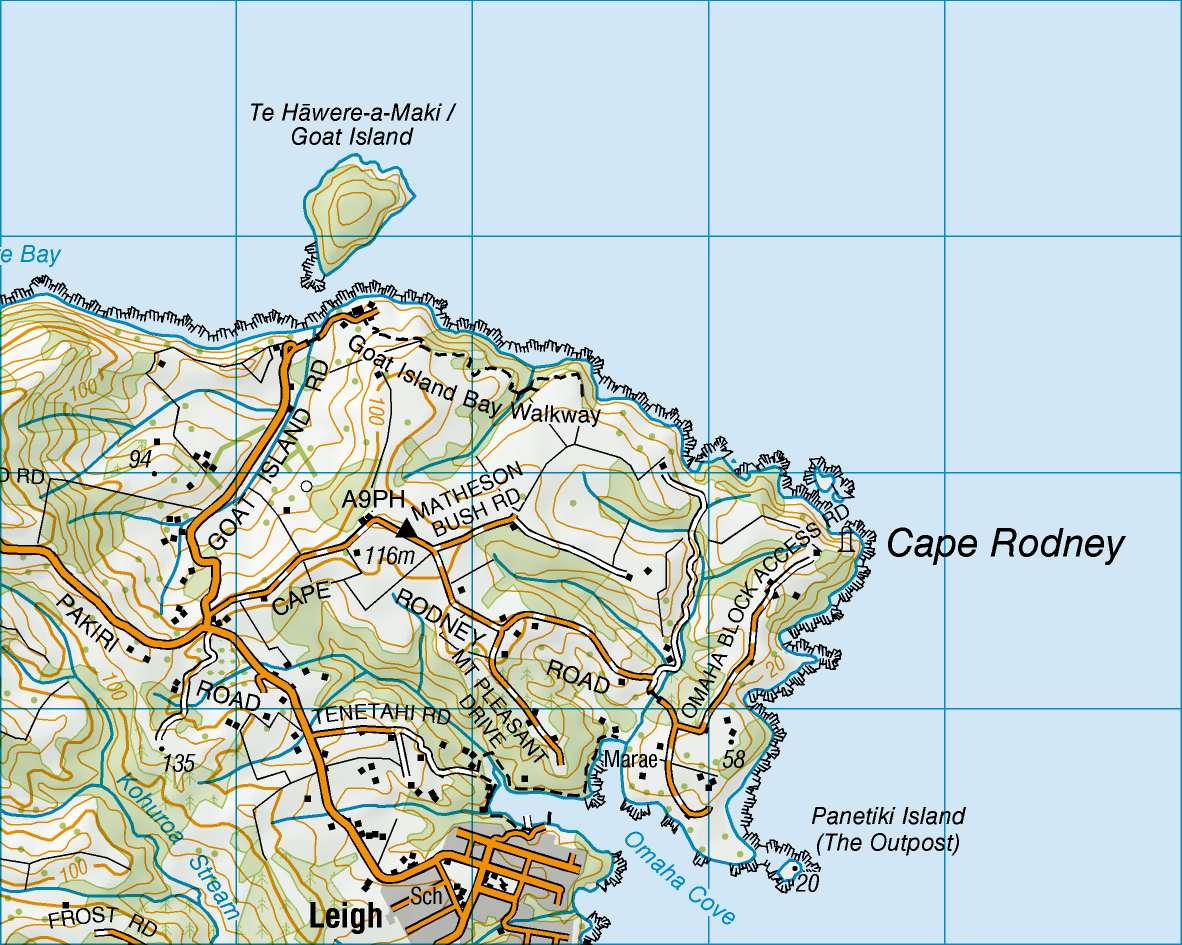
Topographic map of Cape Rodney

Cape Rodney is a coastal point north of Leigh on the North Auckland Peninsula.

== Etymology ==
Cape Rodney was named by Captain James Cook after George Brydges Rodney on 24 November 1769.

== Geology ==
Cape Rodney is made of up of the Triassic–Jurassic Waipapa Group and the Miocene Waitemata Group.

== History ==
The Wakatuwhenua canoe landed at Cape Rodney c.1350.

== Marine Reserve ==
Cape Rodney forms part of the Cape Rodney-Okakari Point Marine Reserve, the first marine reserve in New Zealand. The Leigh Marine Laboratory is located on the cape.
