= Tentorium (disambiguation) =

Tentorium may refer to:

- Tentorium, a feature of arthropod anatomy
- Cerebellar tentorium, a feature of vertebrate anatomy
- Tentorium (sponge), a genus of sea sponges
