= Acanthopolymastia =

Scientific classification
- Kingdom: Animalia
- Phylum: Porifera
- Class: Demospongiae
- Order: Polymastiida
- Family: Spinulariidae
- Genus: Acanthopolymastia; Kelly-Borges & Bergquist, 1997

Type species
- Atergia acanthoxa Koltun, 1964

Species
- A. acanthoxa (Koltun, 1964); A. bathamae Kelly-Borges & Bergquist, 1997; A. pisiformis Kelly-Borges & Bergquist, 1997; A. villosa (Kelly-Borges & Bergquist, 1997)

Genus of sponges

Acanthopolymastia is a small genus of demosponges. These small, bristly, cushion-shaped sponges are only known from deep-sea sites (to a depth of 3400 m) in the southern oceans.

== Species ==
The genus Acanthopolymastia includes the following species:

- Acanthopolymastia acanthoxa (Koltun, 1964)
- Acanthopolymastia bathamae Kelly-Borges & Bergquist, 1997
- Acanthopolymastia pisiformis Kelly-Borges & Bergquist, 1997
- Acanthopolymastia villosa (Kelly-Borges & Bergquist, 1997)
