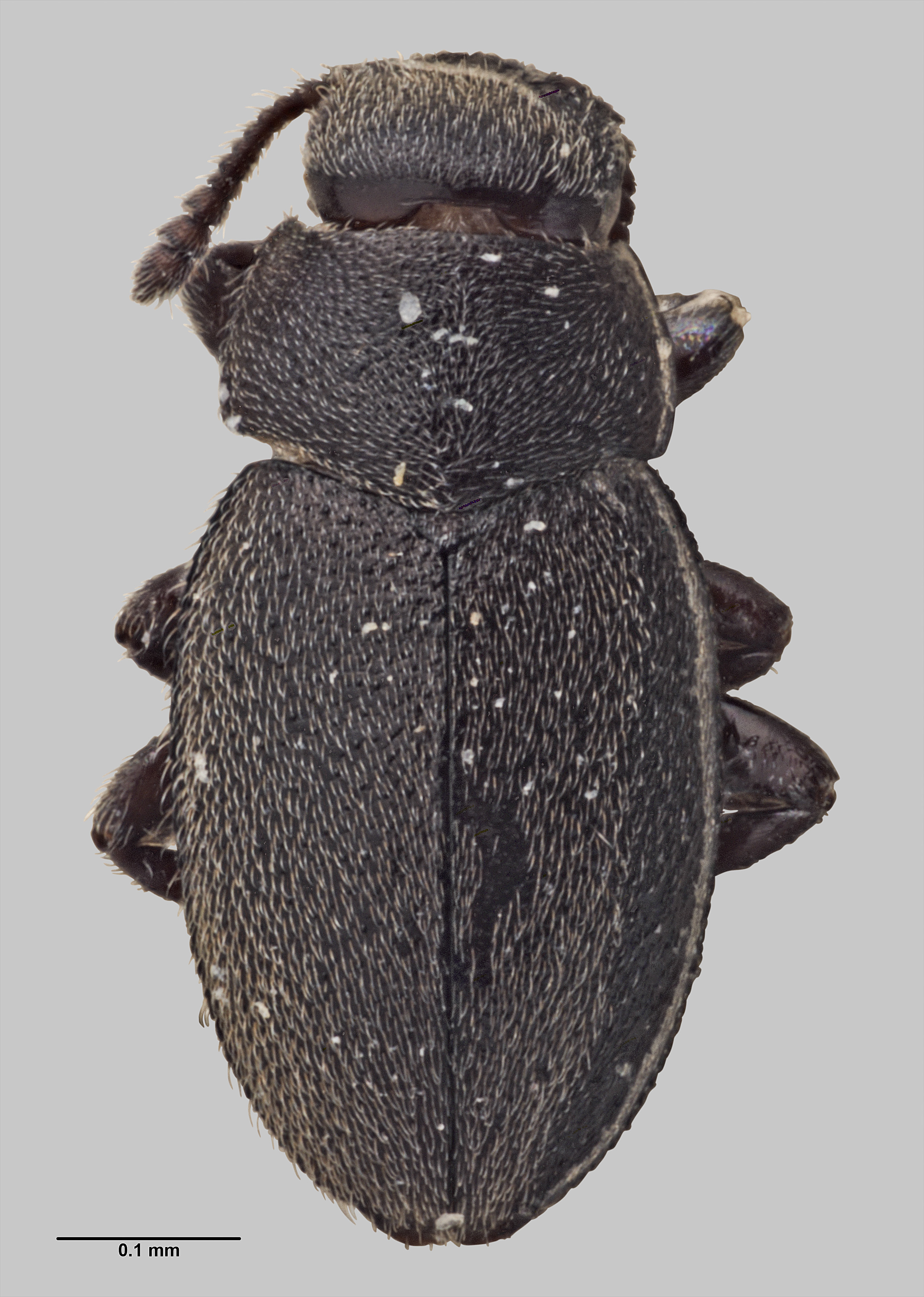
- Hyphalus wisei holotype specimen held at Auckland Museum licensed under CC BY 4.0.

Scientific classification
- Kingdom: Animalia
- Phylum: Arthropoda
- Class: Insecta
- Order: Coleoptera
- Suborder: Polyphaga
- Infraorder: Elateriformia
- Family: Limnichidae
- Genus: Hyphalus
- Species: H. wisei

Binomial name
- Hyphalus wisei Britton, 1973

= Hyphalus wisei =

Species of beetle

Hyphalus wisei is a species of intertidal beetle endemic to New Zealand.

== Description ==
The adult beetle is 1.1 - 1.2 mm long and has a black body with pale coloured setae that give the insect a grey appearance. The larvae of this beetle are 2 mm long and are coloured pale to dark brown. Both the adult beetle and its larvae are very similar in appearance to the species Hyphalus insularis.

== Distribution ==
This species has been found in Rodney County near Te Hāwere-a-Maki / Goat Island. This species has also been found on Cuvier Island.
