= Bill Ballantine (biologist) =

New Zealand marine biologist and conversationist

Bill Ballantine QSO MBE
- Born: William James Ballantine; 15 April 1937; Leicester, Leicestershire, England
- Died: 1 November 2015 (aged 78); Auckland, New Zealand
- Education: Queen Mary College, London
- Awards: Goldman Environmental Prize (1996)
- Scientific career
- Fields: Marine biology
- Workplaces: Leigh Marine Laboratory
- Thesis: The population dynamics of Patella vulgata and other limpets (1961)
- Doctoral advisors: James Eric Smith; John Morton

William James Ballantine QSO MBE (15 April 1937 – 1 November 2015) was a British-born New Zealand marine biologist. He has been called the "father of marine conservation in New Zealand".

== Biography ==
Born in Leicester, England, on 15 April 1937, Ballantine was awarded an MA from Downing College, Cambridge and a PhD from Queen Mary College, University of London. His thesis was entitled The population dynamics of Patella vulgata and other limpets. He emigrated to New Zealand in 1964 when he was appointed the inaugural director of the University of Auckland's Leigh Marine Laboratory. The Marine Reserves Act 1971 was the brainchild of Ballantine, and he initiated a "no take" marine reserve at Leigh. Both of these initiatives were one of the first to be initiated in the world. Minister of Conservation Nick Smith described him as the "father of marine conservation in New Zealand".

Ballantine died at Auckland City Hospital on 1 November 2015; his wife Dulcie had predeceased him.

== Honours and awards ==
In 1990 Ballantine was awarded the New Zealand 1990 Commemoration Medal. In the 1994 New Year Honours, he was appointed a Member of the Order of the British Empire, for services to marine biology and conservation. He was awarded the Goldman Environmental Prize in 1996, for his work on marine conservation and with New Zealand's Marine Reserve Act. In the 2006 Queen's Birthday Honours, Ballantine was made a Companion of the Queen's Service Order, for public services.
