= Stardome Observatory =

Astronomical observatory and planetarium in Auckland, New Zealand

Coordinates: 36°54′21.52″S 174°46′36.25″E

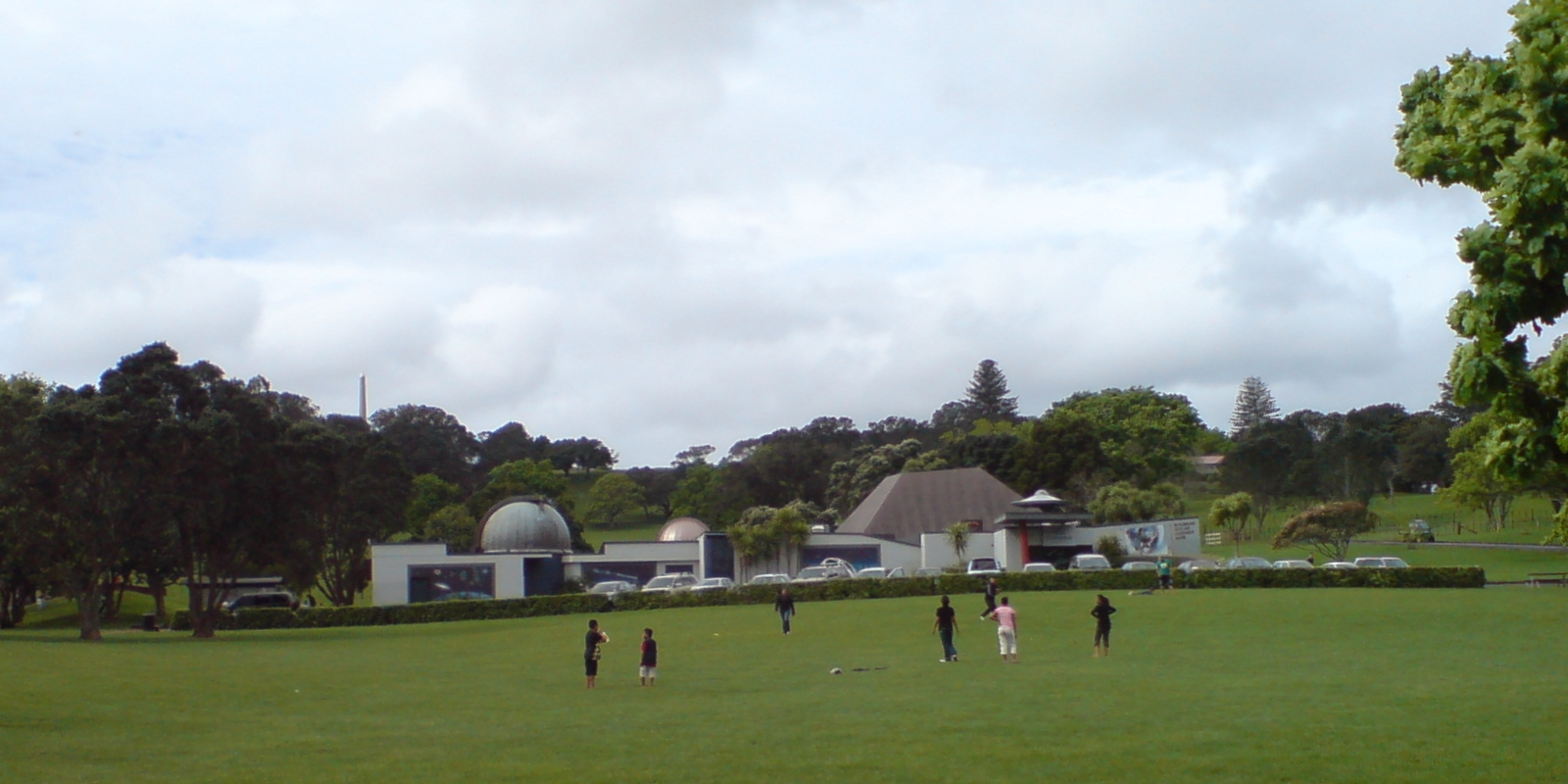
Stardome Observatory & Planetarium from the southwest

Te Whatu Stardome is Auckland's planetarium and observatory and a trusted centre for celestial storytelling, astronomy, mātauranga Māori, and cosmological science. ‘Te Whatu’ links the concept of ‘the eye’ with knowledge and learning, and the cycle of life, death and renewal within the cosmos. Located in Maungakiekie One Tree Hill, it offers fully immersive indoor planetarium shows, telescope viewing, music events and hands-on exhibits.

The planetarium provides year-round Māori astronomy shows as well as a winter season of Matariki shows on the night sky as seen from New Zealand.

Stardome’s immersive, presenter-led fulldome planetarium offers externally-created planetarium shows as well as live shows that are created and narrated by a presenter. Popular Stardome-created shows include Our Sky Tonight, Grand Tour of the Solar System, Looking Up! (The Cosmos for Kids), seasonal Māori astronomy shows, and Matariki - Ngā Whetū o te Tau Hou (Stars of the New Year). After evening shows, visitors can head outdoors to gaze through courtyard telescopes (weather permitting) or experience the magic of the powerful Zeiss telescope with its roof that opens to reveal the dazzling night sky.

Stardome uses the Digistar Projection System, the world's leading planetarium software. Digistar specialises in high-resolution, full-dome immersive experiences. It provides a fulldome cinema experience for astronomy education, allowing for live, data-driven visualisations of the universe rather than just pre-recorded content.

The technology allows for accurate and high quality display of stars, including showing stars from points of view other than Earth's surface, the ability to travel through the stars, and accurately shows celestial bodies from different times in the past and future.

== History of Te Whatu Stardome Observatory & Planetarium ==
Te Whatu Stardome Observatory & Planetarium or 'Stardome' (IAU observatory code 467, previously known as Auckland Observatory) is a public astronomical observatory and planetarium situated in Maungakiekie/One Tree Hill Domain in Auckland, New Zealand.

Stardome has operated from its premises in Auckland's Maungakiekie One Tree Hill Domain since 1967 and has operated as a place of exploration, research and sharing of knowledge ever since.

Stardome's history began in 1948 when the Auckland Astronomical Society began fundraising for a public observatory in Auckland. By 1956 they had significant funds, including a substantial bequest from Edith Winstone Blackwell for the purchase of a telescope for public use. The Society formed the Auckland Observatory and Planetarium Trust Board to build on these funds and provide for the construction and management of a new observatory.

In 1960 One Tree Hill Borough Council provided a 21-year lease, which has been subsequently extended, for a site in One Tree Hill Domain (which Stardome still occupies), and in March 1967 the Observatory opened.

== Relocation to Maungakiekie One Tree Hill Domain ==
Originally the Auckland Museum operated a planetarium which had been donated by the Farmers Trading Company in 1958. The planetarium at the museum closed in 1989, allowing Stardome the opportunity to build a replacement planetarium. Fundraising was undertaken with a clear vision to provide the country with the best facility possible.

Major funding from the Lotteries Commission, the ASB Community Trust, a loan from the Auckland City Council and donations from the Auckland public raised nearly $3 million for the project. The new planetarium and associated facilities opened in February 1997 and the 11 metre domed planetarium cinema remains the largest and most advanced in New Zealand.

Stardome is now a trusted centre for sharing astronomy and mātauranga Māori in Auckland. It offers visitors the experience of learning with entertainment in a planetarium and observatory environment, and allows visitors to explore the interconnections between people, Earth, and the cosmos. Stardome is a registered charity.

Stardome is grateful for the support it receives from the ratepayers of Auckland and Auckland Council through the Auckland Regional Funding Board (ARAFB).

== Premises and location ==
Te Whatu Stardome Observatory & Planetarium is located at 670 Manukau Rd, Epsom, Auckland 1023, within Maungakiekie One Tree Hill Domain. The 1,000 square metre facility has two telescope domes, (one available for public viewing sessions), a 75 seat planetarium, gallery and exhibition space, a retail shop, outdoor courtyard telescope space, and space for education groups as well as private hire.

== Gifting of the name 'Te Whatu' ==
In 2023 Stardome undertook a gallery redevelopment that placed mātauranga Māori alongside Western science. This work was guided by the Tūpuna Maunga Authority and engagement with Ngāti Whātua Ōrākei. After the redeveloped galleries had opened, Ngāti Whātua gifted the name Te Whatu in 2025 – this was a gift, not a commission, and emerged from a relationship rather than a branding exercise. The name Te Whatu – ‘the eye’ or 'the lens' – speaks to the multiple lenses through which we explore the cosmos, and to a single idea: that the lineage of stars above mirrors the lineage of people below.

As kaitiaki and leaseholder on Maungakiekie, Stardome holds a responsibility to uphold the mana of the maunga. The gifted name acknowledges Stardome’s commitment to reflecting the stories, values and significance of the place from which it operates.

== Education at Te Whatu Stardome ==
Te Whatu Stardome Observatory and Planetarium is committed to ensuring that celestial stories, astronomy, mātauranga Māori and cosmological science are shared with integrity and honour, allowing visitors to explore the interconnections between people, Earth, and the cosmos.

Stardome is a recognised ELC (Enriching Local Curriculum) provider, and its education programme is driven by learning objectives that align with Te Whāriki, the New Zealand curriculum, and Te Marautanga.

Stardome is a member of Auckland's GLAM sector, and Te Kāhui Toi Ihiihi – an initiative designed to support Māori Medium ākonga to participate in ELC education within Tāmaki Makaurau Auckland.

In addition to the ELC programme, sessions are also provided for kindergarten and pre-schoolers, university students, defence staff (primarily celestial navigation), geo-survey students, senior groups, corporate and other specialised groups. Bookings usually comprise a planetarium feature show, a night-sky planetarium presentation, time exploring the exhibits and displays, a selection from a 'classroom' session and other activities such as a water bottle rocket launch demonstration, Matariki focus, and telescope viewing.

== Auckland Astronomical Society ==
The Auckland Astronomical Society meets at Stardome on the first four Mondays of every month. The Society offers educational sessions, speakers and lecturers, practical astronomy advice, documentary screening, and educational outreach in the community.

Minor planets discovered: 1
19620 Auckland	18 August 1999	MPC

== Research by Auckland Astronomical Society ==
In 1969, the observatory constructed a UBV photoelectric photometer with assistance from the University of Auckland. This photometer on the Zeiss telescope became a very successful instrument and produced a significant number of published research papers. Probably the most important discovery was the phenomenon of "super-humps" in the SU Ursae Majoris class of cataclysmic binary stars in 1974.

In 1988, the observatory participated in the discovery of the atmosphere of Pluto by measuring the brightness change as the planet passed in front of a star.

During the 1980s, the Zeiss telescope was used to support several doctoral students from the University of Auckland (most notably Rodger Freeth), including the development of a new computer-controlled photon counting photometer. Regular UBV photometry of variable stars continued until 1998, when a CCD camera was first used.

In 1999, a Celestron C-14 Schmidt-Cassegrain telescope was provided by the Nustrini family for installation in the newly built second dome at Stardome Observatory. A grant from the ASB Trust was used to buy a Paramount GT1100s mounting (manufactured by Software Bisque) and an Apogee AP8p CCD camera. The Apogee camera has a back-illuminated SITe003 CCD (1024×1024 24-micrometre pixels). The field of view is 22 arc-minutes. The 0.35 m (f/11) Nustrini telescope is used only for research. In 2006 the Celestron C-14 telescope was replaced by a 40 cm Meade ACF (F/10) and in 2008 CCD camera was replaced by a SBIG ST-6303. The Meade ACF telescope uses an OG530 Orange Schott Optical Glass Filter.

Stardome Observatory & Planetarium is a member of the microFUN collaboration which attempts to detect extra-solar planets by gravitational microlensing. MicroFUN is based at the Astronomy Department of Ohio State University and coordinates the observation of high-magnification microlensing events. In April 2005, microFUN contributed significantly to the discovery of a Jovian-mass planet (OGLE-2005-BLG-071L), the second planet to be detected in this way. In 2005, the Stardome contributed 250 hours of time-series photometry to this collaboration.

Stardome also contributes to the Center for Backyard Astrophysics (CBA) in New York City as CBA-Auckland. This professional-amateur network monitors selected cataclysmic binary stars and contributes to the understanding of these objects. During 2005, over 250 hours of observations where contributed to the CBA.

The research telescope at Stardome is used to make regular astrometric observations of comets and near-Earth objects (NEOs) for the Minor Planet Center. In 2004, observations were made of the NEO 2004 FH which was at the time the closest natural object detected from Earth (43,000 km). CCD photometry obtained at Stardome showed that the object was rotating in 3 minutes, the fastest rotation rate measured for any solar system object.

Research at Stardome is performed on a voluntary basis by members of the Auckland Astronomical Society.

Edith Winstone Blackwell Telescope
Organization	Stardome Observatory
Location	One Tree Hill, Auckland, New Zealand
Wavelength regime	optical
Completion date	1966
Webpage	www.stardome.org.nz
Physical characteristics
Telescope style	Cassegrain
Diameter	0.5 m
Collecting area	0.72 m²
Focal length	6.65 m
Mounting	equatorial
Dome	spherical

== Edith Winstone Blackwell Telescope (Zeiss telescope) ==
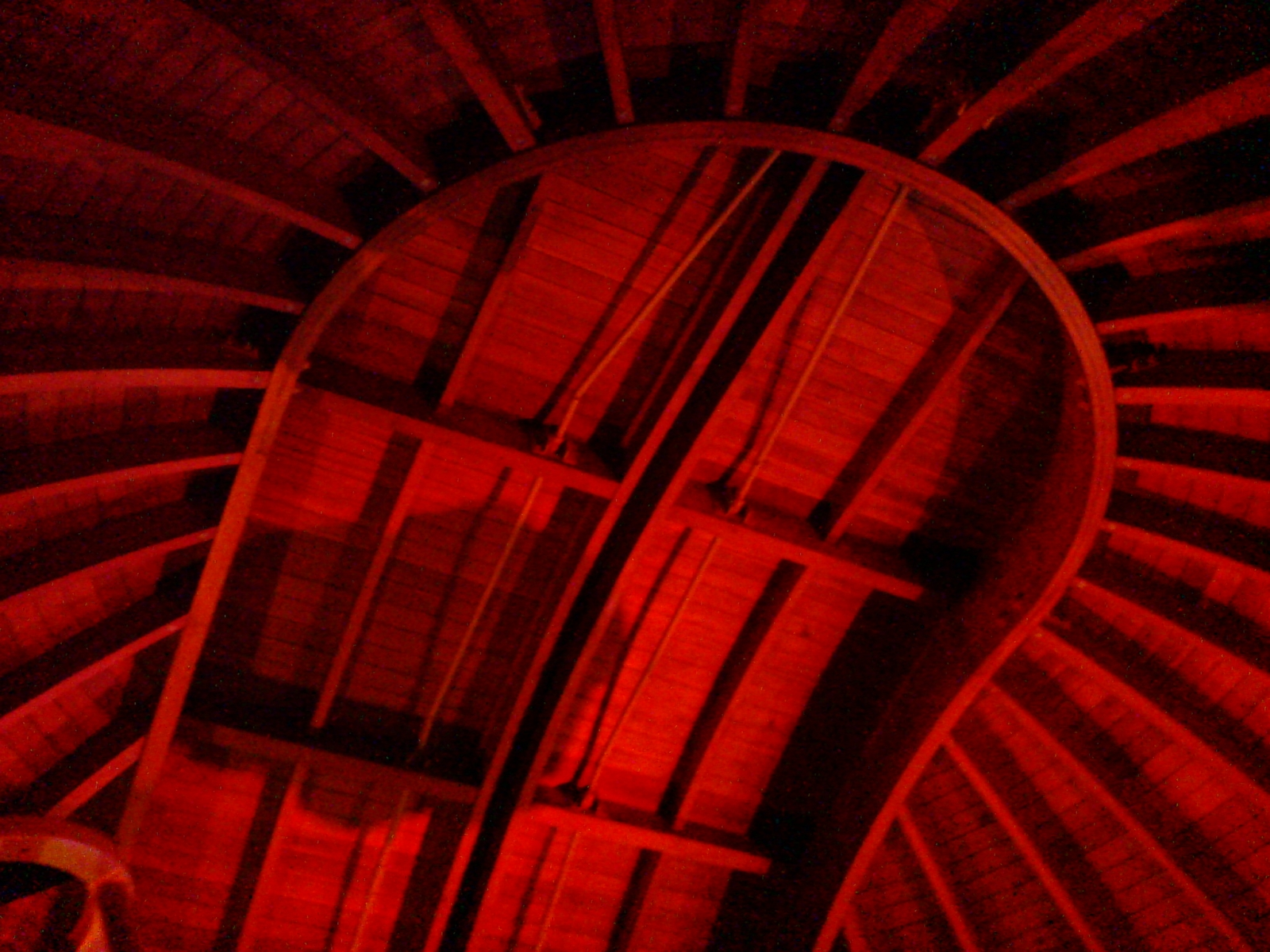
The wooden observatory dome of the EWB telescope from within

The primary fixed telescope is the 0.5 m Edith Winstone Blackwell Telescope (EWB) which is a classical Cassegrain reflector (f/13.3) manufactured by Carl Zeiss of Jena. It was installed in late 1966 and is one of about 20 comparable instruments produced by Zeiss. It is mounted on an offset German equatorial mount. The optical tube assembly weighs about 500 kg and the overall weight, including the mount, is 2500 kg.

The Zeiss telescope was purchased with money from a gift to the people of Auckland by the late Edith Winstone Blackwell MBE. It has been heavily used for both public viewing and research since being commissioned in 1967.

== See also ==
- List of astronomical observatories
- List of astronomical societies
- List of planetariums
- Lists of telescopes
