= Atergia =

Scientific classification
- Kingdom: Animalia
- Phylum: Porifera
- Class: Demospongiae
- Order: Polymastiida
- Family: Polymastiidae
- Genus: Atergia; Stephens, 1915

Genus of sponges

Atergia is a genus of sponges belonging to the family Polymastiidae.

Species:

- Atergia corona Dickinson, 1945
- Atergia corticata Stephens, 1915
- Atergia villosa (Kelly-Borges & Bergquist, 1997)
