= Royal Society Expedition to the British Solomon Islands Protectorate =

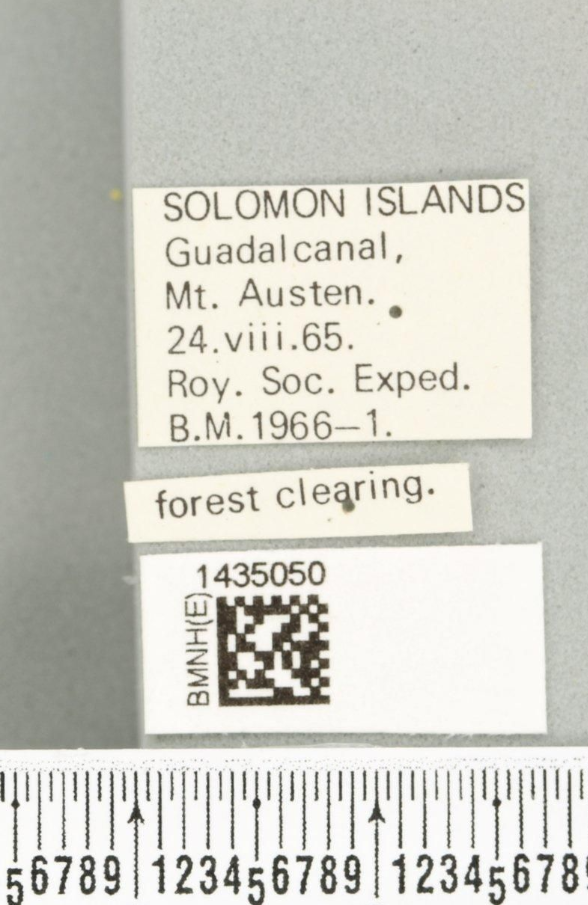
- Location: British Solomon Islands
- Start: July 1965
- End: December 1965
- Leader: E. J. H. Corner
- Organiser: Royal Society
- Funder: Dominion Museum; British Museum; Royal Botanic Gardens, Kew; Ministry of Overseas Development; Royal Society Te Apārangi
- Participants: E. J. H. Corner; Kenneth Ernest Lee; Hugh Bryan Spencer Womersley; Richard Dell; Derek Arden Challis; John F. Peake

The Royal Society Expedition to the British Solomon Islands Protectorate was a research expedition organised by the Royal Society in 1965 to undertake research into the biodiversity of the British Solomon Islands.

== Purpose of the expedition ==
The expedition set out to study invertebrates, forest plants, and coastal marine ecology, focusing on their distributions. Prior to the expedition, the Royal Society stated "[the expedition] can make a highly significant contribution to scientific knowledge, not only because of the light it can throw on the migration of plants and animals in the past, but also because of the knowledge of the rules which govern such movements." This could inform how distributions may change in the future.

== Voyage ==
Led by Edred John Henry Corner, the expedition departed in July 1965, returning in December that year, following a preliminary visit in 1964.

The expedition was split between marine and land parties. The marine party was led by John Morton, on the vessel A. K. Maroro captained by Captain S. Brown. The land party made multiple surveys of two to four weeks duration at several locations including Guadalcanal, San Cristobal, and others.

== Participants ==
Participants came from British, New Zealand, and Australian institutions.

- E. J. H. Corner, University of Cambridge, expedition leader
- John Morton, University of Auckland, marine party leader
- Kenneth Ernest Lee, Commonwealth Scientific and Industrial Research Organisation
- Hugh Bryan Spencer Womersley, University of Adelaide
- A. Bailey, University of Adelaide
- Derek Arden Challis, University of Auckland
- Richard Dell, Dominion Museum
- H Miller, University of Auckland
- S. Browne, captain of A. K. Maroro
