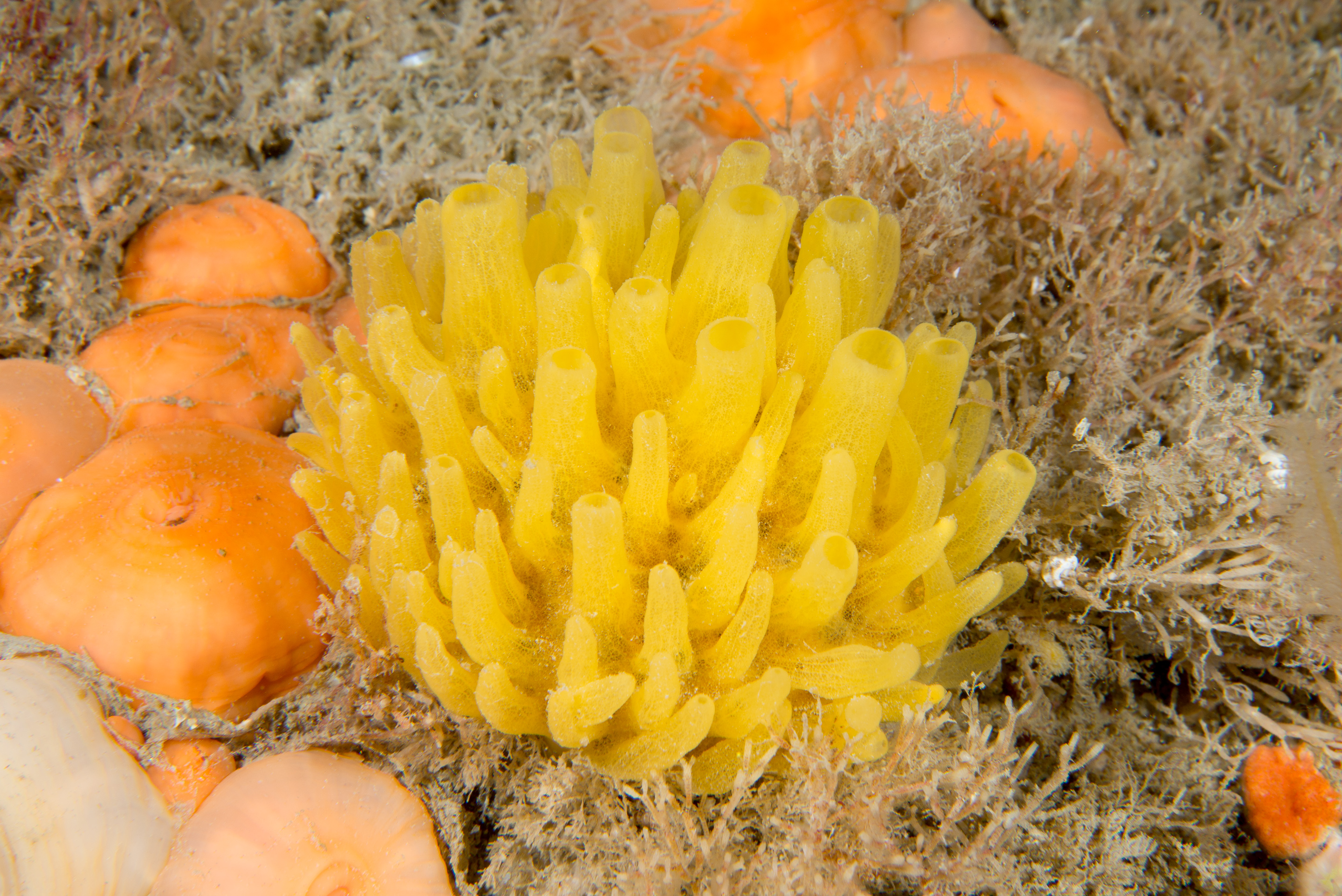
- The sponge Polymastia boletiformis, Scilly Isles, UK.

Scientific classification
- Domain: Eukaryota
- Kingdom: Animalia
- Phylum: Porifera
- Class: Demospongiae
- Order: Polymastiida
- Family: Polymastiidae
- Genus: Polymastia; Bowerbank, 1863

Species
- 70+, see text

Synonyms
- List: Pencillaria Gray, 1867; Polymastica [lapsus]; Rinalda Schmidt, 1870; Sideroderma Lendenfeld, 1883; Trichostemma Sars, 1869

= Polymastia (sponge) =

Genus of sponges

Polymastia is a genus of sea sponges containing about 30 species. These are small to large encrusting or dome-shaped sponges with a smooth surface having many teat-shaped projections (papillae). In areas of strong wave action, this genus does not grow the teat structures, but instead grows in a corrugated form.

== Species ==
The following species are recognised:

- Polymastia actinioides Koltun, 1966
- Polymastia affinis Thiele, 1898
- Polymastia agglutinans Ridley & Dendy, 1886
- Polymastia andrica de Laubenfels, 1949
- Polymastia arctica (Merejkowsky, 1878)
- Polymastia atlantica Samaai & Gibbons, 2005
- Polymastia aurantia Kelly-Borges & Bergquist, 1997
- Polymastia azorica Lévi & Vacelet, 1958
- Polymastia bartletti de Laubenfels, 1942
- Polymastia bicolor Carter, 1886
- Polymastia boletiformis (Lamarck, 1815)
- Polymastia bouryesnaultae Samaai & Gibbons, 2005
- Polymastia clavata Burton, 1959
- Polymastia conigera Bowerbank, 1874
- Polymastia corticata Ridley & Dendy, 1886
- Polymastia crassa Carter, 1886
- Polymastia craticia Hallmann, 1912
- Polymastia crocea Kelly-Borges & Bergquist, 1997
- Polymastia dendyi Whitelegge, 1897
- Polymastia disclera Lévi, 1964
- Polymastia echinus Kelly-Borges & Bergquist, 1997
- Polymastia ectofibrosa Boury-Esnault, Pansini & Uriz, 1994
- Polymastia fluegeli Lehnert, Stone & Heimler, 2005
- Polymastia fordei Lehnert & van Soest, 1999
- Polymastia fusca Bergquist, 1961
- Polymastia gemmipara Dendy, 1916
- Polymastia granulosa Brøndsted, 1924
- Polymastia grimaldi (Topsent, 1913)
- Polymastia harmelini Boury-Esnault & Bézac, 2007
- Polymastia hemisphaerica (Sars, 1872)
- Polymastia hirsuta Bergquist, 1968
- Polymastia hispidissima Koltun, 1966
- Polymastia inflata Cabioch, 1968
- Polymastia invaginata Kirkpatrick, 1907
- Polymastia isidis Thiele, 1905
- Polymastia janeirensis (Boury-Esnault, 1973)
- Polymastia koltuni Van Soest & Hooper, 2020
- Polymastia kurilensis Koltun, 1962
- Polymastia laganoides Lambe, 1895
- Polymastia littoralis Stephens, 1915
- Polymastia lorum Kelly-Borges & Bergquist, 1997
- Polymastia maeandria Wilson, 1904
- Polymastia mamillaris (Müller, 1806)
- Polymastia martae Boury-Esnault, Pansini & Uriz, 1994
- Polymastia massilis Carter, 1886
- Polymastia megasclera , 1934
- Polymastia murrayi Burton, 1959
- Polymastia nigra Alcolado, 1984
- Polymastia nivea (Hansen, 1885)
- Polymastia pachymastia de Laubenfels, 1932
- Polymastia pacifica Lambe, 1893
- Polymastia paupera Fristedt, 1887
- Polymastia penicillus (Montagu, 1814)
- Polymastia pepo Kelly-Borges & Bergquist, 1997
- Polymastia piscesae Austin, Ott, Reiswig, Romagosa & McDaniel, 2014
- Polymastia polytylota Vacelet, 1969
- Polymastia radiosa Bowerbank, 1866
- Polymastia rara Koltun, 1966
- Polymastia rubens Kelly-Borges & Bergquist, 1997
- Polymastia simplicissima Thiele, 1898
- Polymastia sola Pulitzer-Finali, 1983
- Polymastia spinula Bowerbank, 1866
- Polymastia svenseni Plotkin, Gerasimova & Rapp, 2018
- Polymastia tenax Pulitzer-Finali, 1986
- Polymastia thielei Koltun, 1964
- Polymastia tissieri (Vacelet, 1961)
- Polymastia toporoki Koltun, 1966
- Polymastia tropicalis Lévi, 1967
- Polymastia tubulifera Dendy, 1922
- Polymastia uberrima (Schmidt, 1870)
- Polymastia umbraculum Kelly-Borges & Bergquist, 1997
- Polymastia varia Verrill, 1907
- Polymastia villosa Desqueyroux-Faúndez & van Soest, 1997
- Polymastia zitteli (Lendenfeld, 1888)
