= Polymastiida =

Scientific classification
- Kingdom: Animalia
- Phylum: Porifera
- Class: Demospongiae
- Subclass: Heteroscleromorpha
- Order: Polymastiida; Morrow & Cárdenas, 2015

Families
- Polymastiidae Gray, 1867; Spinulariidae Santín & Brandt, 2026

Order of sea sponges

Polymastiida is an order of sea sponges.

== Taxonomy and history ==
The order Polymastiida was erected in 2015 to accommodate the demosponge family Polymastiidae, previously placed in the now-defunct paraphyletic order Hadromeridam, and was then considered monotypic. A second family in the order, Spinulariidae, was erected in 2026 to accommodate the deep sea genera Spinularia, Acanthopolymastia, Pseudotrachya, and Tentorium.

== Families ==
The order Polymastiida includes the following families:

- Polymastiidae Gray, 1867
- Spinulariidae Santín & Brandt, 2026
