= Marine reserve =

Type of marine protected area

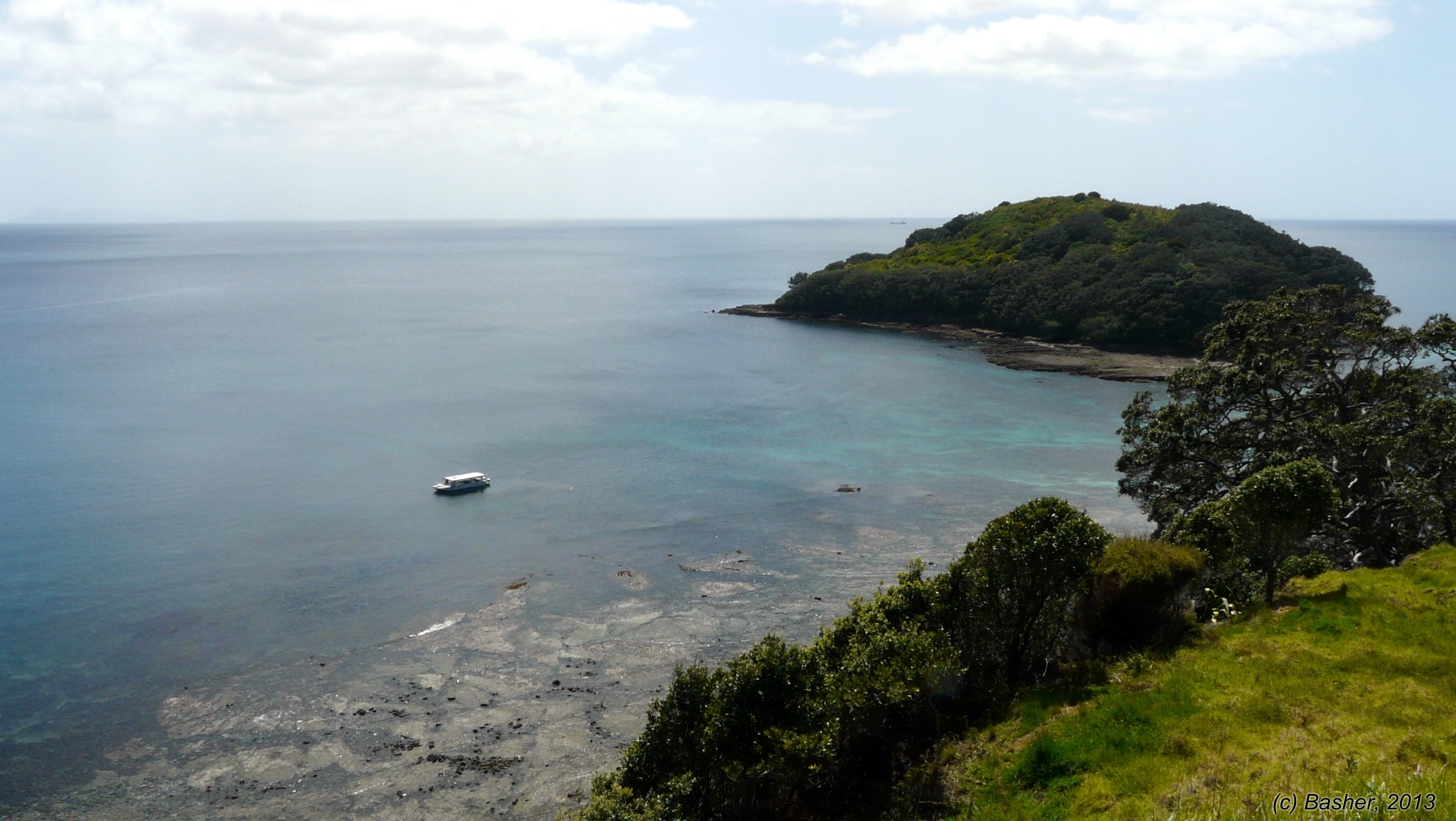
Te Hāwere-a-Maki / Goat Island in Cape Rodney-Okakari Point Marine Reserve (Leigh, Warkworth, New Zealand).

A marine reserve is a type of marine protected area (MPA). An MPA is a section of the ocean where a government has placed limits on human activity. A marine reserve is a marine protected area in which removing or destroying natural or cultural resources is prohibited, marine reserves may also be "no-take MPAs,” which strictly forbid all extractive activities, such as fishing and kelp harvesting. As of 2007 less than 1% of the world's oceans had been set aside in marine reserves. Benefits include increases in the diversity, density, biomass, body size and reproductive potential of fishery and other species within their boundaries.

As of 2010, scientists had studied more than 150 marine reserves in at least 61 countries and monitored biological changes inside the reserves. The number of species in each study ranged from 1 to 250 and the reserves ranged in size from 0.006 to 800 square kilometers (0.002 to 310 square miles). In 2014, the World Parks Association adopted a target of establishing no-take zones for 30% of each habitat globally by 2030.

Based on early 2026 data, 9.6% of the ocean is protected, but, only 3.2% of it can be considered as highly protected. However, a study conducted in 2024 by a team from MPAtlas that established a baseline for the 30 x 30 target by evaluating over 90% of the global MPA area, found that approximately one quarter of existing reported marine protection is not yet implemented on the water and an additional one-third allows highly impactful activities that are not compatible with conservation.

== Design ==
A review of studies of 34 families (210 species) of coral reef fishes demonstrates that the design of a marine reserve has important implications for its ability to protect habitat and focal species.

=== Size and shape ===
Effective reserves included habitats that support the life history of focal species (e.g. home ranges, nursery grounds, migration corridors and spawning aggregations), and were located to accommodate movement patterns among them.

Movement patterns (home ranges, ontogenetic shifts and spawning migrations) vary among and within species, and are influenced by factors such as size, sex, behaviour, density, habitat characteristics, season, tide and time of day. For example, damselfishes, butterflyfishes and angelfishes travel <0.1–0.5 km, while some sharks and tuna migrate over thousands of kilometres. Larval dispersal distances tend to be <5–15 km, and self-recruitment to new habitat is common.

The review indicated that effective marine reserves are more than twice the size of the home range of focal/target species (in all directions). The presence of effective marine management outside the reserve may allow smaller reserves. Reserve size recommendations apply to the specific habitats of focal species, not the overall size. For example, coral reef species require coral reef habitats rather than open ocean or seagrass beds.

Marine reserve whose boundaries are extensively fished benefit from compact shapes (e.g., squares or circles rather than elongated rectangles). Including whole ecological units (e.g., an offshore reef) can reduce exports where that is desired.

=== Habitats ===
Minimum sustainable population sizes have not been determined for most marine populations. Instead, fisheries ecologists use the fraction of unfished stock levels as a proxy. Meta-analyses suggest that maintaining populations above ~37% of those levels generally ensures stable populations, although variations in fishing pressure allow fractions as small as 10% or as large as 40% (to protect species such as sharks and some grouper that have lower reproductive output or slower maturation). Higher fractions of habitat protection may protect areas vulnerable to disturbances such as typhoons or climate change. 20–30% protection can achieve fisheries objectives in areas with controlled fishing pressure and is the minimum level of habitat protection recommended by IUCN-WCPA.

=== Special areas ===
Many fish species congregate to facilitate spawning. Such congregations are spatially and temporally predictable and increase the species' vulnerability to overfishing. Species such as groupers and rabbitfishes travel long distances to congregate for days or weeks. Such gatherings are their only opportunities to reproduce and are crucial to population maintenance. Species such as snappers and parrotfishes congregate in feeding or resting areas. Juveniles may congregate in nursery areas without adults. Such special areas may require only seasonal protections if at other times no vital activities are taking place. Such reserves must be spaced to allow focal species to journey among them. If the location of such special areas is unknown, or is too large to include in a reserve, management approaches such as seasonal capture and sales restrictions may provide some protection. Sea turtle nesting areas, dugong feeding areas, cetacean migratory corridors and calving grounds are examples of other special areas that can be protected seasonally. Other types of special areas include isolated habitats that have unique assemblages and populations, habitats that are important for endemic species and highly diverse areas.

=== Isolated populations ===
Isolated populations (e.g. those on remote atolls) have high conservation value where they harbor endemic species and/or unique assemblages. A location or population 20–30 km from its nearest neighbor generally qualifies as isolated in the absence of a persistent linking current. Their isolation (low connectivity) requires such areas to be largely self-replenishing. This leaves them less resilient to disturbance. Sustaining their marine species requires a higher fraction of living areas to be protected.

=== Recovery ===
Coral reef fish species recovery rates (from e.g., overfishing) depend on their life history and factors such as ecological characteristics, fishing intensity and population size. In the Coral Triangle, species at lower trophic levels that have smaller maximum sizes, faster growth and maturation rates and shorter life spans tend to recover more quickly than species having the opposite characteristics. For example, in the Philippines, populations of planktivores (e.g., fusiliers) and some herbivores (e.g., parrotfishes) recovered in <5–10 years in marine reserves, while predators (e.g., groupers) took 20–40 years. Increased fishing pressure adversely affects recovery rates (e.g., Great Barrier Reef and Papua New Guinea).

Long-term protection allows species with slower recovery rates to achieve and maintain ecosystem health and associated fishery benefits. Permanent protection protects these species over the long-term. Short-term protections do not allow slow-recovering species to reach or maintain stable populations.

In some Coral Triangle countries (e.g., Papua New Guinea and Solomon Islands), short term protections are the most common form of traditional marine resource management. These protections can help address problems at lower trophic levels (e.g., herbivores) or allow spawning to succeed. Other reasons for adopting short-term protections include allowing communities to stockpile resources for feasts or close areas for cultural reasons. Short-term/periodic reserves also may function as partial insurance by enhancing overall ecosystem resilience against catastrophes. Reopened reserves can be protected by management controls that limit the harvest to less than the increase achieved during closure, although at greatly reduced recovery rates.

=== Resilience ===
Some habitats and species are better prepared environmental changes or extremes. These include coral communities that handle high sea surface temperature (SST); areas with variable SSTs and carbonate chemistry and areas adjacent to undeveloped low-lying inland areas that coastal habitats can expand into as sea levels rise. Such areas constitute climate change refugia and can potentially better protect biodiversity than more fragile areas. They may also provide fishery benefits, since habitat loss from climate change is a major fishery threat.

=== Local practices ===
Local practices such as overfishing, blast fishing, trawling, coastal development and pollution threaten many marine habitats. These threats decrease ecosystem health and productivity and adversely affect focal and other species. Such practices can also decrease resilience. Some practices that originate beyond reserve boundaries (e.g., runoff) can be mitigated by considering their impacts within broader management frameworks. Areas that are not threatened by such practices and that are adjacent to other unthreatening areas may be better choices for reserves.

== Networks ==
Networks of marine reserves can support both fisheries management and biodiversity conservation. The size, spacing and location of reserves within a network must respect larval dispersal and movement patterns of species that are targeted for protection.

=== Design ===
Existing ecological guidelines for designing networks independently focus on achieving either fisheries, biodiversity or climate change objectives or combinations of fisheries and biodiversity or biodiversity and climate change. These three goals have different implications for network design. The most important are reserve size and protection duration (permanent, long term, short term, or periodic closures).

==== Diversity ====
Maintaining diversity involves protecting all species. Generally this involves protecting adequate examples of each major habitat (e.g., each type of coral reef, mangrove and seagrass community). Resiliency to threats improves when multiple examples of each habitat are protected.

To address biodiversity or climate change, reserves 4–20 km across are recommended, because they protect larger populations of more species.

=== Climate change ===
Protecting areas that have already proven resilient to ecological changes and/or are relatively well-protected by other protocols are likely to better survive climate change as well.

==== Fisheries ====
Reserves 0.5–1 km across export more adults and larvae to fished areas, potentially increasing recruitment and stock replenishment there. Such small reserves are common in the Coral Triangle, where they benefited some fisheries.

=== Connectivity ===
Connectivity is the linking of local populations through the (voluntary) dispersal of individuals. Connected reserves are close enough to each other that larvae, juveniles or adults can cross from one to another as their behavior patterns dictate. Connectivity is a key factor in network design, since it allows a disturbed reserve to recover by recruiting individuals from other, potentially overpopulated, reserves. Effective networks spaced reserves at distances of <15 km from each other, with smaller reserves spaced more closely.

Most coastal fish species have a bipartite life cycle where larvae are pelagic before settling out of the plankton to live on a reef. While these fish travel varying distances during their life history, their larvae have the potential to move tens to hundreds of km, more than the more sedentary adults and juveniles, which have home ranges of <1 m to a few km. Adults and juveniles of some species travel tens to hundreds of kilometers as they mature to reach appropriate habitats (e.g., such as coral reef, mangrove and seagrass habitats) or to migrate to spawning areas. When adults and juveniles leave a marine reserve, they become vulnerable to fishing. However, larvae can generally leave a reserve without elevated risk because of their small size and limited fishery exposure. Effective networks account for the movement patterns of target species at each life cycle stage.

Given a strong, consistent current, siting marine reserves upstream increases downstream populations.

== Other protected marine categories ==
Marine reserves are distinct from marine parks, and marine sanctuaries, but there is some overlap in usage.

== Open ocean reserves ==
As of April 2008 no high seas marine reserves had been established. Greenpeace is campaigning for the "doughnut holes" of the western pacific to be declared as marine reserves and for 40 percent of the world's oceans to be so protected.

== See also ==
- Marine park
- Marine protected area
- List of marine protected areas
