= Leigh Marine Laboratory =

Marine laboratory in New Zealand

Coordinates: 36.2693°S 174.7982°E

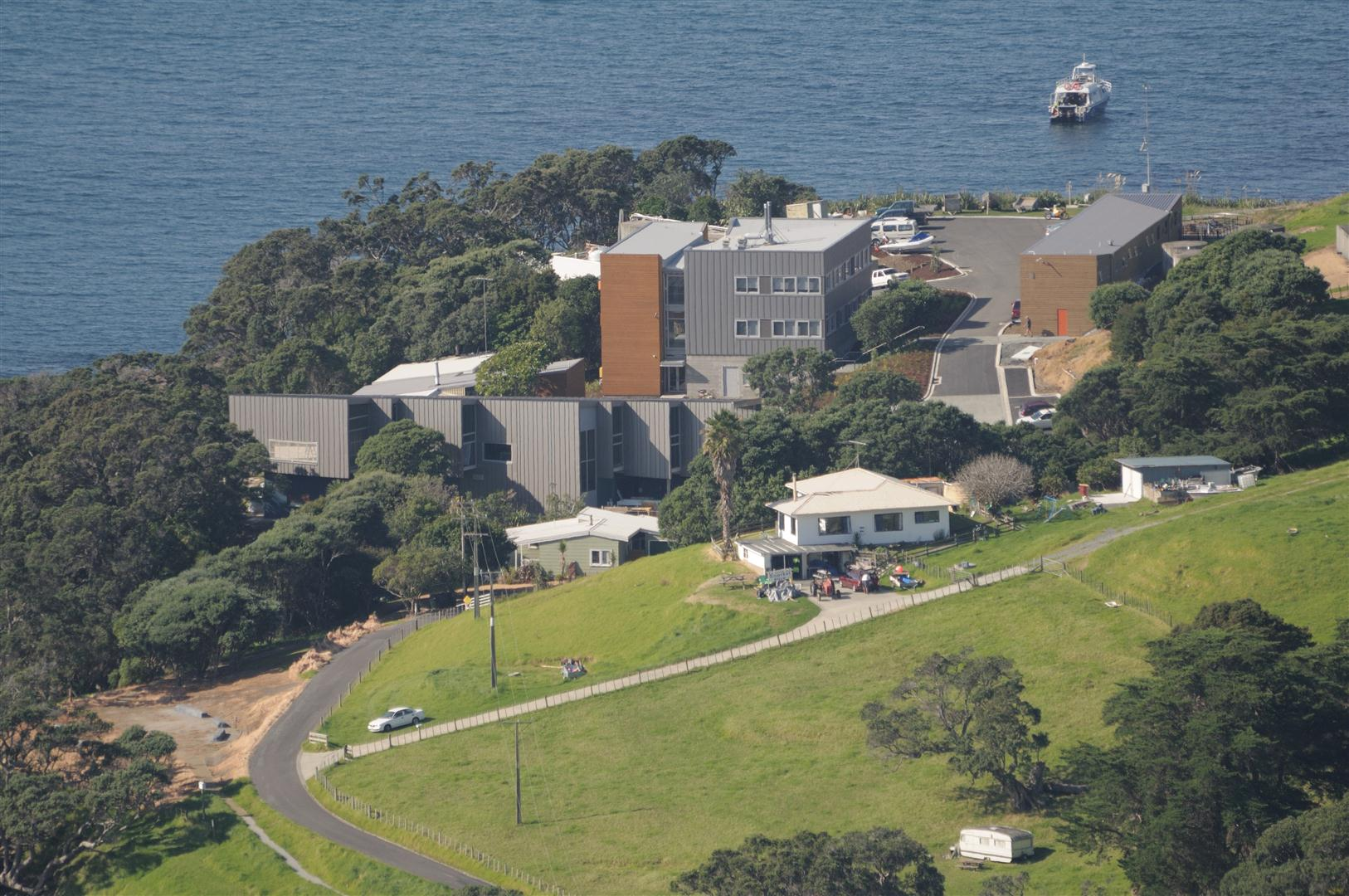
Leigh Marine Laboratory

The Leigh Marine Laboratory is the marine research facility for the University of Auckland in New Zealand. The laboratory is situated in north eastern New Zealand, 100 kilometres (62 mi) north of Auckland city. The facility is perched on the cliffs overlooking the Cape Rodney-Okakari Point Marine Reserve that covers 5 kilometres (3.1 mi) of coastline from Cape Rodney to Okakari Point.

== History ==
Leigh Marine Laboratory was opened in 1964 in the small coastal community of Leigh. The first director of the marine laboratory, Bill Ballantine was instrumental in the establishment of the adjacent Goat Island marine reserve in 1975, the first marine protected area in New Zealand.

In 2009 a major redevelopment of the Leigh Marine Laboratory began with new facilities being opened in 2010. The new facilities included a new accommodation and workshop building, a three-story research building and an interpretive educational centre for public visitors.

== Research ==
A wide range of research activities are undertaken at the laboratory, including marine biogeography, physiology, ecology, genetics, marine fisheries and aquaculture. The laboratory has nine academic staff on site, with support staff. Further academic staff from the main University of Auckland campus are also frequent users of the laboratory. Postgraduate research is a major feature of the Leigh Laboratory.

The laboratory has a fleet of small boats and the 15.9-metre catamaran Te Kaihōpara, launched in 2023. The vessel replaced the aging Hawere and was given to the university by iwi Ngāti Manuhiri, a partner in mussel reef restoration.

An important part of research at the Leigh Marine Laboratory is supporting the development of aquaculture in New Zealand. In addition, research is undertaken on climate change, conservation and restoration, whales and dolphins, microplastics, noise pollution, sea birds, seafloor ecology, aquaculture, kelp and kina.

== Gallery ==
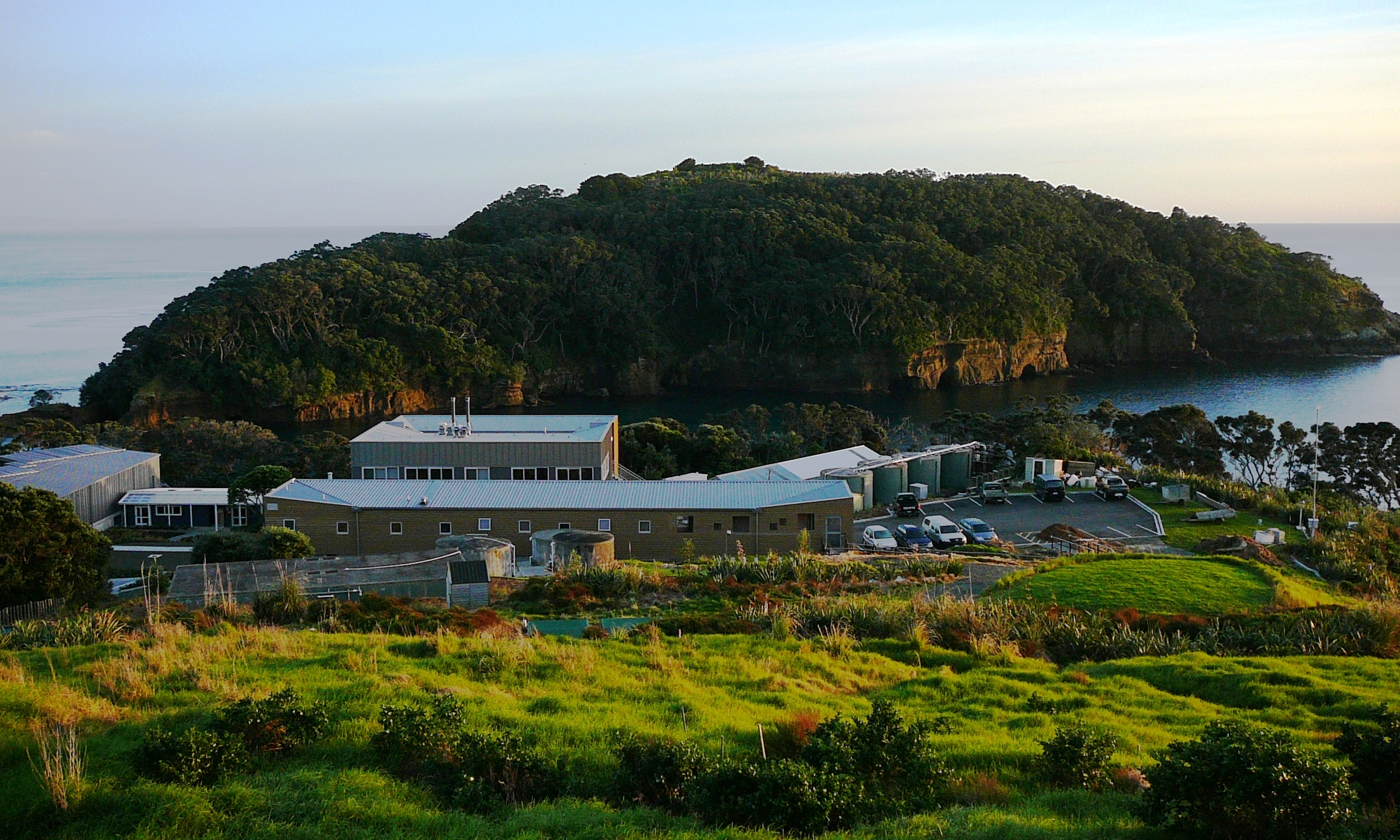
Leigh Marine Laboratory overlooking Te Hāwere-a-Maki / Goat Island

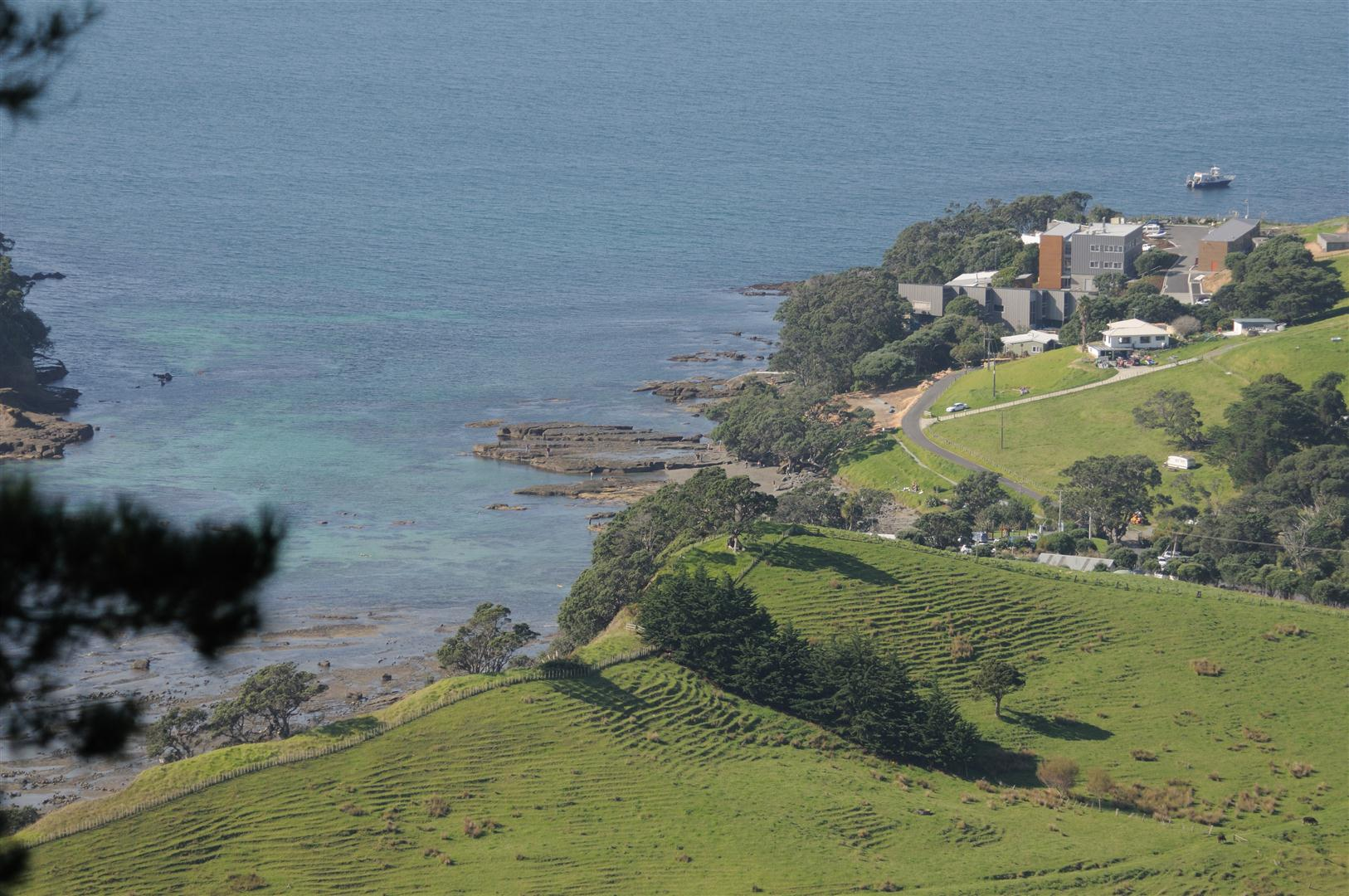
Leigh Marine Laboratory and surrounding Goat Island marine reserve

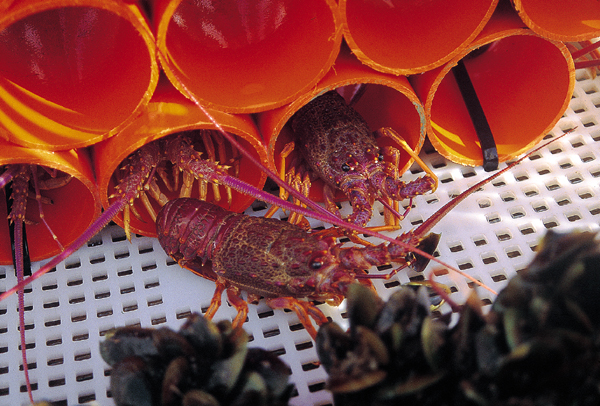
Lobster aquaculture research

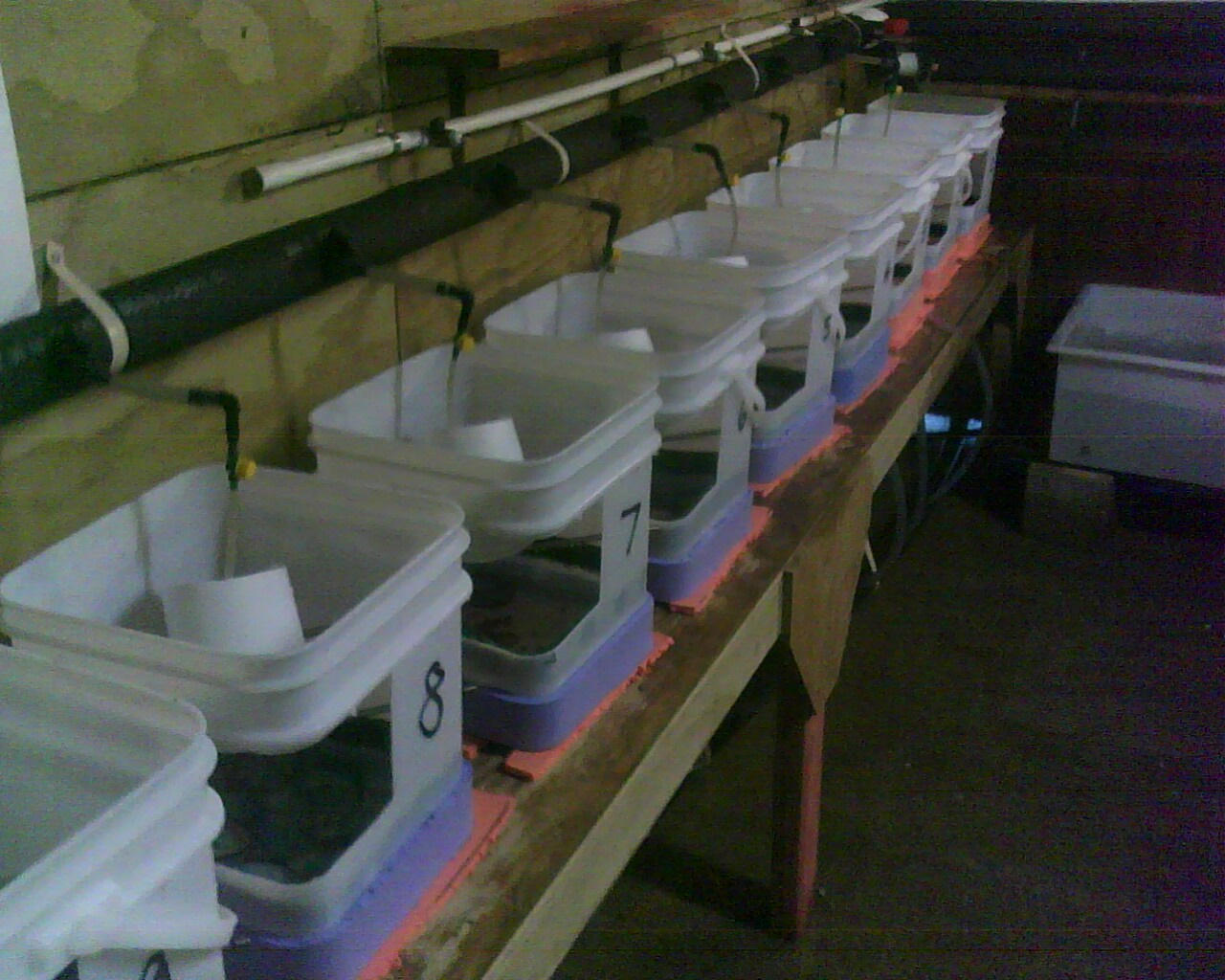
Research on black footed paua Haliotis iris
