= Cape Rodney-Okakari Point Marine Reserve =

Protected area in New Zealand

- IUCN category Ia (strict nature reserve)
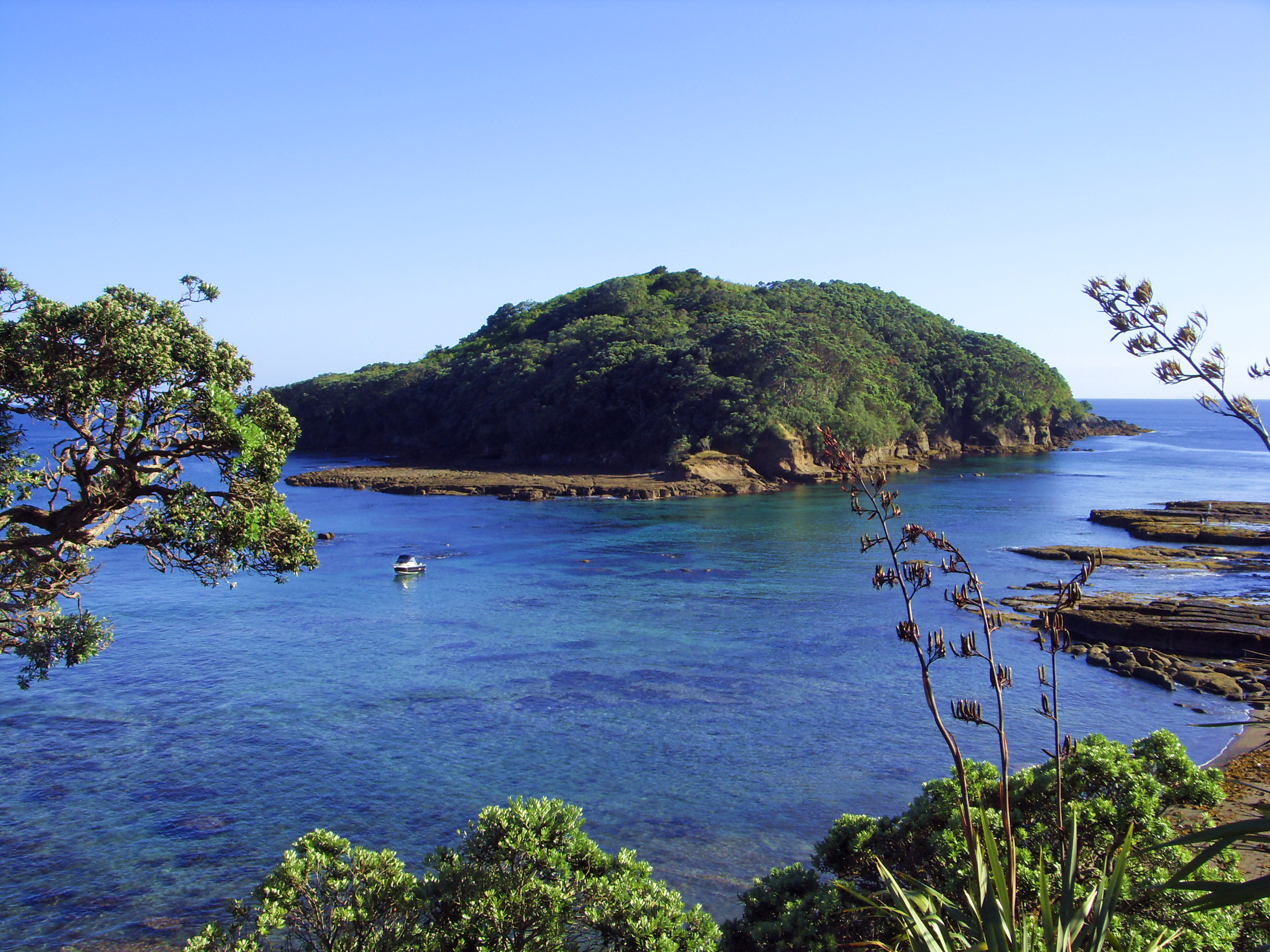
- Te Hāwere-a-Maki / Goat Island and surrounding waters, included with the Cape Rodney-Okakari Point Marine Reserve.
- Interactive map of Cape Rodney-Okakari Point Marine Reserve
- Location: North Island, New Zealand
- Nearest city: Leigh
- Coordinates: 36.2652449°S 174.7978878°E
- Area: 547 hectares (1,350 acres)
- Established: 1975
- Website: Official Department of Conservation profile

Cape Rodney-Okakari Point Marine Reserve is a 5.5 km^{2} (2.1 sq mi) protected area in the North Island of New Zealand. All fishing, and the removal or disturbing of marine life or materials, is forbidden within the reserve.

The reserve covers an area of 547 ha (1,350 acres), extending from Cape Rodney to Okakari Point, extending 800m offshore. Te Hāwere-a-Maki / Goat Island lies within the reserve and Leigh is the closest town. It was created in 1975 as the first marine reserve in New Zealand.

Auckland University operates Leigh Marine Laboratory at the reserve. Laboratory scientists have scientific equipment around the reserve to study how marine ecosystems function.

== Geography ==
The marine reserve has a variety of shores, including the rocky headland of Cape Rodney, the white sandy surf beach at Pakiri, and the sheltered mudflats and mangrove forests of Whangateau Harbour.

There are also boulders, course sand, mudstone terraces, pebblestone rock and greywacke, providing a range of habitats for marine life.

== History ==
Te Hāwere-a-Maki, also known as Goat Island or Motu Hāwere, is important to Ngāti Manuhiri, who trace their whakapapa to the earlier iwi of Wakatūwhenua, who landed with the Moekākara waka captained by Tahuhunuiarangi. The island is named after Maki, the son of the iwi's founding ancestor Manuhiri, who led the conquest of the area in the late seventeenth century. Manuhiri's grandson maintained a pā on the island.

Ngāti Manuhiri maintained homes and farms in the area until after early European settlement. They received formal title over the island in 1901.

The reserve was established in 1975. Before the marine reserve was established, the seafloor had an imbalanced ecosystem dominated by kina, due to over-harvesting of predator species like rock lobster and snapper. By 2011, after more than 35 years of protection, there was an abundance and diversity of fish in the reserve.

== Wildlife ==
There is an abundance of fish and marine life in the reserve, including Australasian snapper and New Zealand sea urchin (kina).

There are also seaweed forests, sponge gardens, coraline turf, kelp forest, and encrusting marine life living in deep creeks.

Sea-anemones, boulder crabs and bristle-tails live under boulders. Sand-hoppers and sea-lice live in the course sand. There are a range of creatures in the mudstone terraces and pebblestone rock, including snails, limpets, chitons, whelks, crabs, half-crabs, shrimps, starfish, small fish, sea-quirts, barnacles, tubeworms and oysters.

== Recreation ==
The reserve has about 200,000 visitors per year.

It is used by snorkeling, scuba-diving and kayaking. However, it is unsuitable for in-water activities during east east or north-east winds of 20 knots or more, and east or north-east swells of more than a metre.

Kayaking and boating is permitted in the reserve, and there is a boat launching ramp near the reserve at Omaha Cove. Boats are permitted to navigate and anchor carefully, but dragging anchors can damage marine life. Fishing is banned.

Dogs are not permitted anywhere within the reserve, including on foreshore areas. Divers must not break off small fragile animals like hydroids, lace corals and sponges. Visitors are also not permitted to fish, feed fish, or move underwater rocks. On-shore rocks can be turned over carefully, but must be returned to their original position.

The Cape Rodney Walkway follows the cliffs to the east of the marine reserve along Cape Rodney, and begins with a steep climb. Additionally, a farm walkway can be found near the reserve. Visitors can also explore rock pools at low tide.

== See also ==
- Leigh Marine Laboratory
- List of marine reserves of New Zealand
