= Tentorium (sponge) =

Scientific classification
- Kingdom: Animalia
- Phylum: Porifera
- Class: Demospongiae
- Order: Polymastiida
- Family: Spinulariidae
- Genus: Tentorium; Vosmaer, 1887

Type species
- Thecophora semisuberites Schmidt, 1870

Species
- T. labium Ekins, Erpenbeck & Hooper, 2023; T. levantinum Ilan, Gugel, Galil & Janussen, 2003; T. papillatum (Kirkpatrick, 1908); T. semisuberites (Schmidt, 1870)

Synonyms
- Thecophora Schmidt, 1870

Genus of sea sponges

Tentorium is a genus of sea sponges.

== Taxonomy and history ==
Tentorium was described in 1887 by Gualtherus Carel Jacob Vosmaer as a replacement name for Thecophora, a sponge genus described by Eduard Oscar Schmidt in 1870. The name Thecophora was preoccupied by the fly genus Thecophora, described in 1945 by Camillo Rondani.

== Species ==
The genus Tentorium includes the following species:

- Tentorium labium Ekins, Erpenbeck & Hooper, 2023
- Tentorium levantinum Ilan, Gugel, Galil & Janussen, 2003
- Tentorium papillatum (Kirkpatrick, 1908)
- Tentorium semisuberites (Schmidt, 1870)
