= Goat Island (Auckland) =

Island in New Zealand

Te Hāwere-a-Maki (Māori)
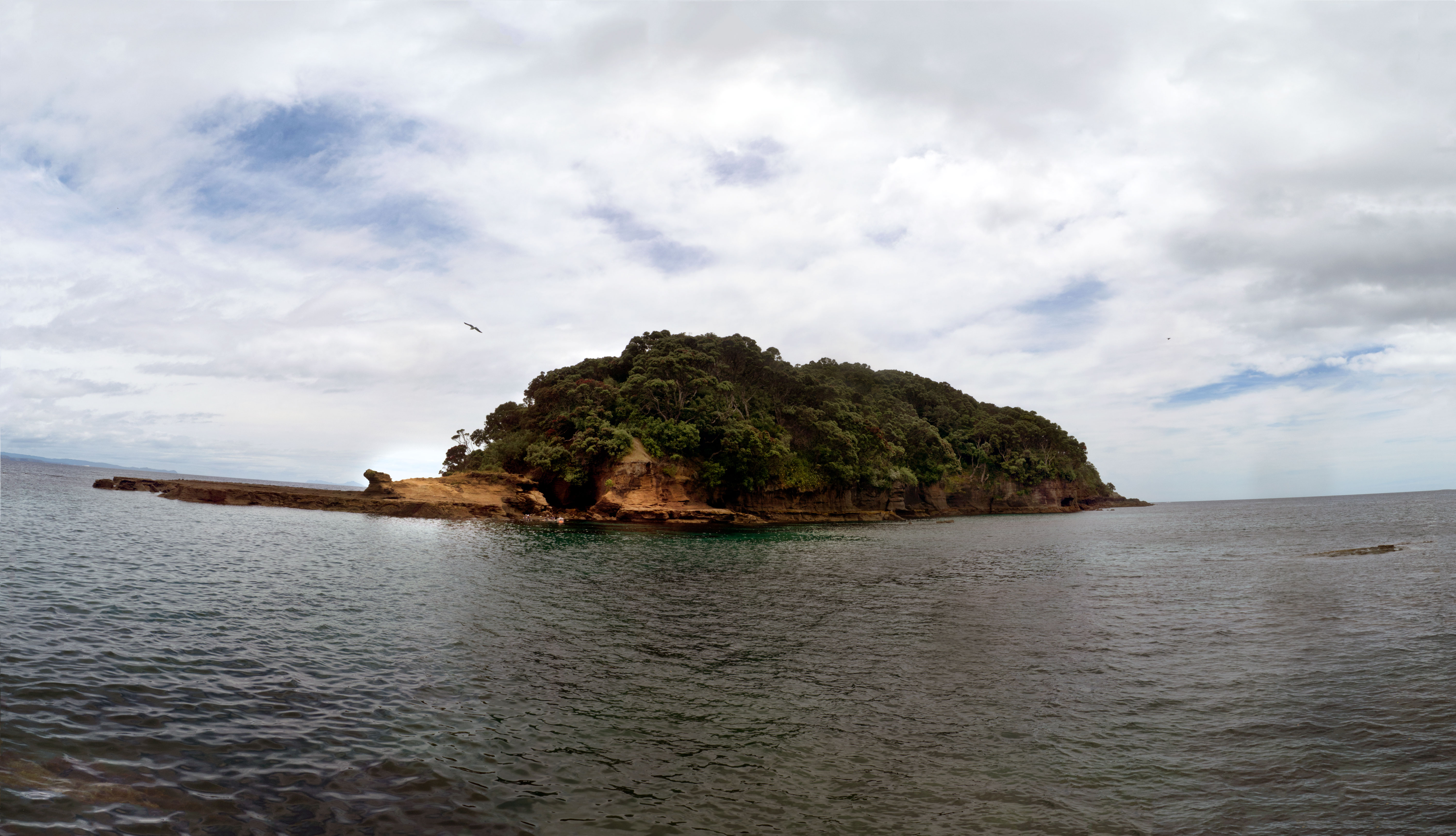
- Goat Island, being close to the shore, is a magnet for divers.
- Interactive map of Goat Island

Geography
- Location: Auckland Region
- Coordinates: 36.2652449°S 174.7978878°E

Administration
- New Zealand

Goat Island or Te Hāwere-a-Maki is a tiny island (approximately 1 hectare or 2.5 acres) in New Zealand located close to the North Island coast, north of Auckland, northeast of Warkworth, and directly west of Little Barrier Island. It is within Cape Rodney-Okakari Point Marine Reserve, New Zealand's first marine reserve.

== History ==
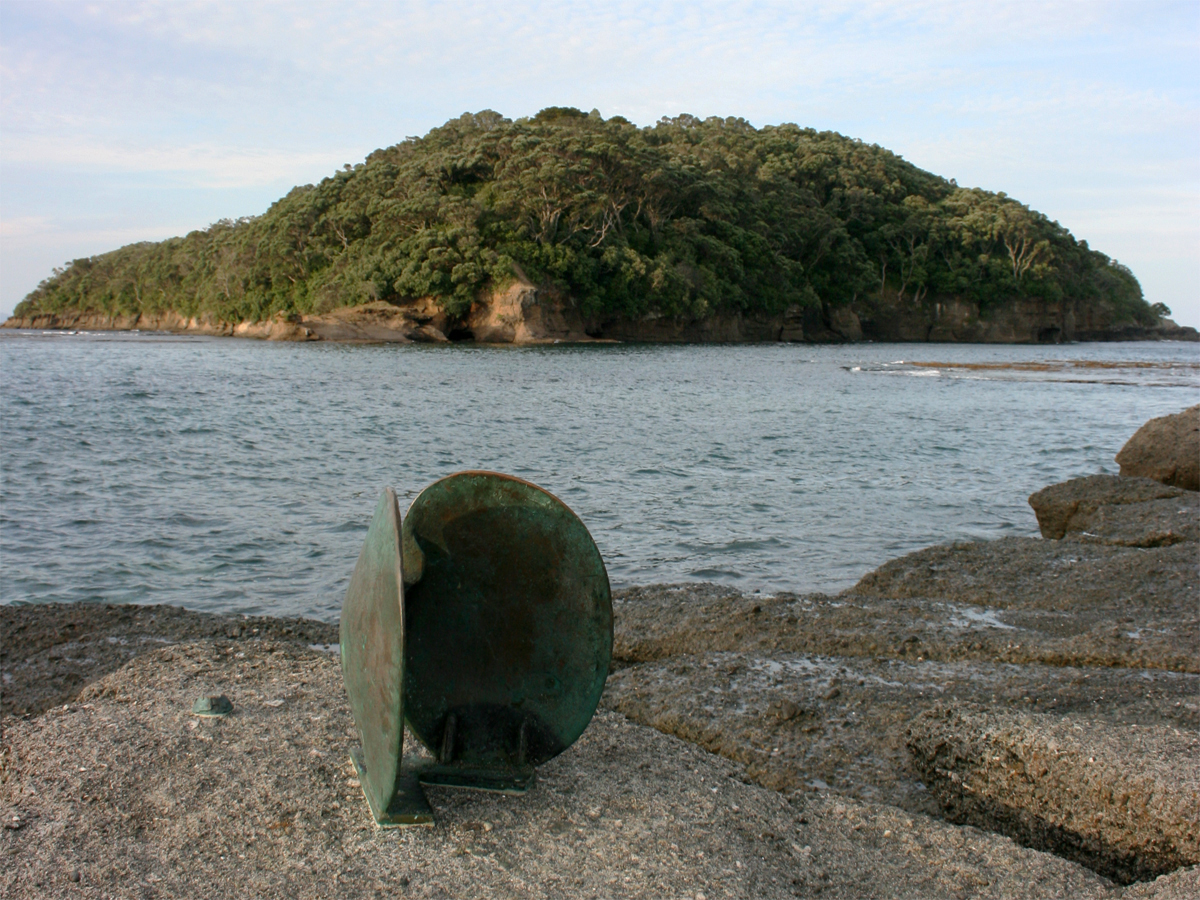
Goat Island, as seen from the mainland beach

The island is spiritually significant to Ngāti Manuhiri, the local Māori tribe, because their ancestral waka (canoe) Moekākara is said to have landed nearby.

The Cape Rodney-Okakari Point Marine Reserve was established in 1975, making Goat Island and the surrounding waters a protected area. As well as being in a marine reserve, Goat Island is a scenic reserve. The University of Auckland has a research facility at Goat Island known as the Leigh Marine Laboratory headed by Professor John Montgomery. This will form the base for the University's new South Pacific Centre for Marine Science (SPCMS). Prime Minister Helen Clark launched the national and international campaign to raise funds for the SPCMS at Leigh on 21 June 2008.

Takangaroa – another island in the same area – was also once known as "Goat Island".

== Flora and fauna ==
Goat Island and its surrounding area provide the habitat for the endemic beetle species Hyphalus wisei.

== See also ==
- List of islands of New Zealand
- List of islands
