= Michelle Kelly (marine scientist) =

New Zealand marine biologist

- Born: 1961 (age 64–65); Otago, New Zealand
- Other name: Michelle Kelly-Borges
- Education: University of Auckland
- Scientific career
- Fields: Sponges
- Workplaces: National Institute of Water and Atmospheric Research
- Theses: Systematics and ecology of the sponges of Motupore Island, Papua New Guinea (1986); The Order Hadromerida (Porifera: Demospongiae), taxonomy and relationships of the major families (1991)
- Doctoral advisors: Patricia Bergquist; Peter Bergquist
- Author abbrev. (zoology): Kelly; Kelly-Borges
- Website: NIWA profile

Michelle Kelly (born 1961), also known as Michelle Kelly-Borges, is a New Zealand scientist who specialises in sponges, their chemistry, their evolution, taxonomy, systematics, and ecology.

== Early life and education ==
Born in Otago in 1961, Kelly lived in Papua New Guinea with her family from 1970 to 1980, and was educated at The Correspondence School. From 1980, she studied at the University of Auckland, and completed a Bachelor of Science degree in 1983, and a Master of Science with honours in 1987. Her masterate research, supervised by Patricia Bergquist, was an investigation of the systematics and ecology of the sponges of Motupore Island in Papua New Guinea. The title of that thesis was Systematics and ecology of the sponges of Motupore Island, Papua New Guinea. She then earned a PhD at the University of Auckland in 1991 under the joint supervision of Patricia and Peter Bergquist, with a thesis entitled, The order Hadromerida (Porifera: Demospongiae), taxonomy and relationships of the major families, and in the same year (with Patricia Bergquist) published a paper on the genus, Tethya.

== Research career ==
From 1991 to 1992, Kelly was a post-doctoral fellow at the Florida Atlantic University Harbor Branch Oceanographic Institute, working with Shirley A. Pomponi, studying natural products extracted from deep-sea sponges and analysing DNA sequences. In 1994 she was collaborating with Patricia Bergquist at the University of Auckland. From 1993, she spent four years with the Natural History Museum, London, carrying out research on sponges in the Indo-Pacific, before returning to New Zealand and working as a senior scientist in the Department of Landscape and Plant Science at Unitec Institute of Technology in Auckland and a consultant to the Coral Reef Research Foundation in Micronesia. At some point she was affiliated with the University of Hawai'i System. By 2001, she was working at the National Institute of Water and Atmospheric Research, in Auckland, where she continues to work (as of September 2021).

Her zoological author abbreviations are Kelly-Borges, and Kelly.

Kelly has described over 80 taxa and has had at least one sponge named for her (Abyssocladia kellyae), "for her numerous contributions to sponge science, and her work on deep-sea carnivorous and non-carnivorous sponges from the SW Pacific". See also taxa named by Michelle Kelly.

In 2011, Kelly was awarded the degree of Doctor of Science by the University of Auckland, on the basis of her papers published since 1988 on the taxonomy, systematics and phylogeny of sponges.
