= Patricia Bergquist =

New Zealand anatomist and biologist (1933–2009)

Dame Patricia Bergquist DBE
- Born: Patricia Rose Smyth; 10 March 1933; Devonport, Auckland, New Zealand
- Died: 9 September 2009 (aged 76); Auckland, New Zealand
- Education: Auckland University College
- Spouse: Peter Leonard Bergquist (m. 1958)
- Children: 1
- Scientific career
- Fields: Zoology
- Workplaces: University of Auckland
- Thesis: The Demospongiae of New Zealand — systematics, distribution and relationships (1961)
- Doctoral advisors: William Roy McGregor; John Morton
- Doctoral students: Michelle Kelly-Borges; Jane Fromont

Dame Patricia Rose Bergquist DBE (née Smyth, 10 March 1933 – 9 September 2009) was a New Zealand zoologist who specialised in anatomy and taxonomy. At the time of her death, she was professor emerita of zoology and honorary professor of anatomy with radiology at the University of Auckland.

== Early life, family and education ==
Born Patricia Rose Smyth in the Auckland suburb of Devonport on 10 March 1933, Bergquist was the daughter of William Smyth, an electrician, and Bertha Ellen (née Penny) Smyth, a homemaker. She had a younger brother Norman and a sister Catherine.

She was educated at Devonport Primary School, and then Takapuna Grammar School where she was dux in her final year. She then began studying at Auckland University College in 1950, graduating MSc with first-class honours in botany in 1956; the title of her master's thesis was Contributions to the study of the loxsomaceae. After completing a second MSc equivalent in zoology, she undertook doctoral studies at Auckland, obtaining her PhD, supervised by William Roy McGregor and John Morton, on the taxonomy of the Porifera in 1961. Bergquist was the first person to earn a doctoral degree in zoology from the University of Auckland.

In 1958, she married Peter Bergquist, a noted molecular biologist, and the couple went on to have one daughter.

== Academic and research career ==
Following her doctorate, Patricia Bergquist studied overseas, initially at Yale University where she broadened her systematic expertise, before returning to New Zealand and becoming an educator and researcher at the University of Auckland on matters related to anatomy, taxonomy and zoology, with particular interest in the marine sponge. She felt a stable framework of higher level classification which would permit recognition of generic relationships and facilitate descriptions of new species was missing. When Bergquist received a Personal Chair at the University of Auckland, she was the first woman at that university to do so.

She co-authored (with Mary E. Sinclair) The Morphology and Behaviour of Larvae of Some Intertidal Sponges for the New Zealand Journal of Marine and Freshwater Research, which was published on 20 October 1967.

Bergquist's notable students include Michelle Kelly-Borges and Jane Fromont.

In 1979, Bergquist was conferred the degree of Doctor of Science by the University of Auckland, on the basis of 28 submitted publications.

== Honours and awards ==
Bergquist was elected a Fellow of the Royal Society of New Zealand in 1982, and in 1989 she was awarded the Hector Memorial Medal by the Royal Society of New Zealand. In the 1994 New Year Honours, she was appointed a Dame Commander of the Order of the British Empire, for services to science. Her husband, Peter Bergquist, was appointed an Officer of the New Zealand Order of Merit, for services to science, in the 2012 Queen's Birthday and Diamond Jubilee Honours.

== Legacy ==
Numerous sponges have been named in her honour, e.g., Xestospongia bergquistia Fromont, 1991, Tethya bergquistae Hooper, 1994, Acarnus bergquistae Van Soest, Hooper & Hiemstra, 1991, Plakortis bergquistae Muricy, 2011, and Phyllospongia bergquistae Wahab & Fromont, 2020.

Bergquist featured as one of the Royal Society Te Apārangi's "150 women in 150 words" project in 2017.

== See also ==
- Taxa named by Patricia Bergquist

== Death ==
Patricia Bergquist died of breast cancer in Auckland on 9 September 2009, aged 76.
