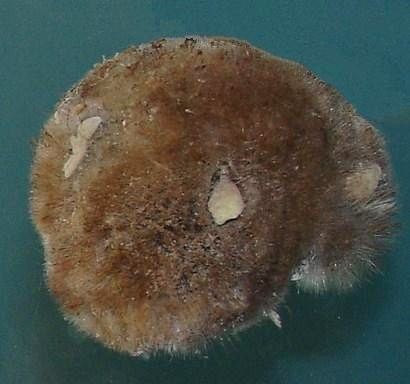
- Polymastia invaginata

Scientific classification
- Kingdom: Animalia
- Phylum: Porifera
- Class: Demospongiae
- Order: Polymastiida
- Family: Polymastiidae; Gray, 1867

Genera
- See text

= Polymastiidae =

Family of sponges

Polymastiidae is a family of demosponges found in oceans throughout the world. It is the only family in the monotypic order Polymastiida. A useful diagnostic characteristic of members of this family is the presence of numerous surface papillae although this feature is shown by some other sponges.

== Genera ==
The following genera are recognised in the family Polymastiidae

- Acanthopolymastia
- Astrotylus
- Atergia
- Koltunia
- Polymastia
- Proteleia
- Pseudotrachya
- Quasillina
- Radiella
- Ridleia
- Sphaerotylus
- Spinularia
- Tentorium
- Trachyteleia
- Tylexocladus
- Weberella
