= Warkworth Town Hall =

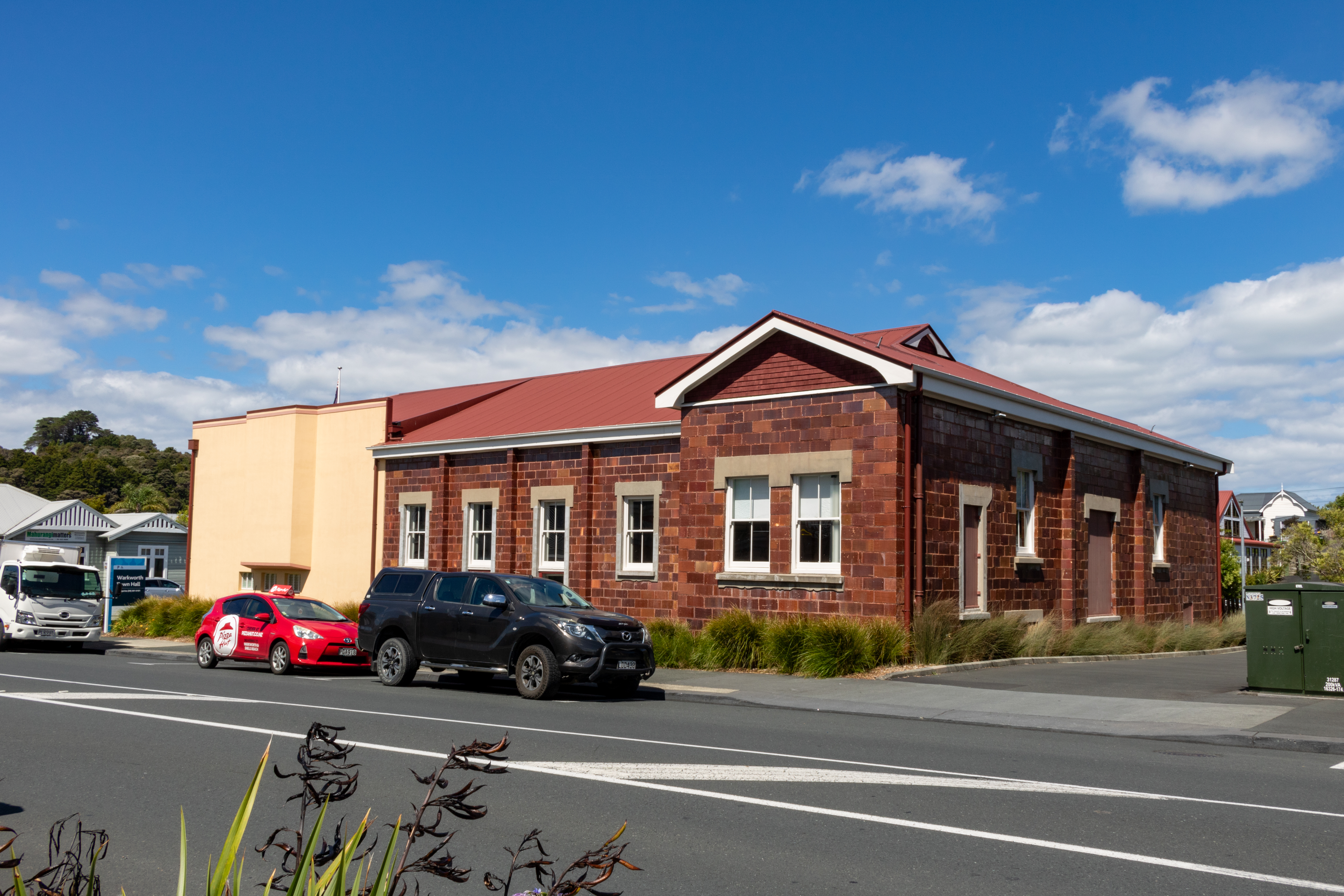
- The town hall after restoration work

General information
- Location: 9 Neville Street and 2 Alnwick Street, Warkworth, New Zealand
- Coordinates: 36.3995°S 174.6648°E
- Year built: 1911
- Opened: 14 October 1911
- Closed: 2011
- Renovation cost: $5.6 million
- Owner: Auckland Council

Design and construction
- Architect: Arthur Bibra Herrold (original) Llewelyn Piper (1937)
- Developer: Thomas Edwin Clark

Heritage New Zealand – Category 1
- Designated: 22 June 2007
- Reference no.: 7709

Warkworth Town Hall is the only extant civic building constructed from glazed hollow ceramic blocks. In 1910 the Warkworth Town Board hired architect Arthur Bibra Herrold to design a town hall and the tender was won by Thomas Edwin Clark, who used a novel glazed hollow ceramic block containing a vertical divider in the construction. Clark's blocks were not widely adopted and by 1914 stopped production: making the Warkworth Town Hall a rare example of the construction technique. The town hall became the centre of the town and regularly hosted social events. The growth of the Warkworth led to a desire to expand the town hall and in 1937 an Art Deco extension was added onto the building. Later extensions in the 1960s and 1970s unfavourably added onto the building and in the 2010s a modern annexe was added onto the building. Due to the rare construction technique and the strong tie between the town hall and the settlement it is registered as a category 1 building with Heritage New Zealand.

== History ==
The first town hall in Warkworth was constructed in 1864 on Bertram Street and was managed by the Warkworth Road Board. By the 20th-century that building had become rundown and replacements were investigated by the board, although nothing eventuated from this.

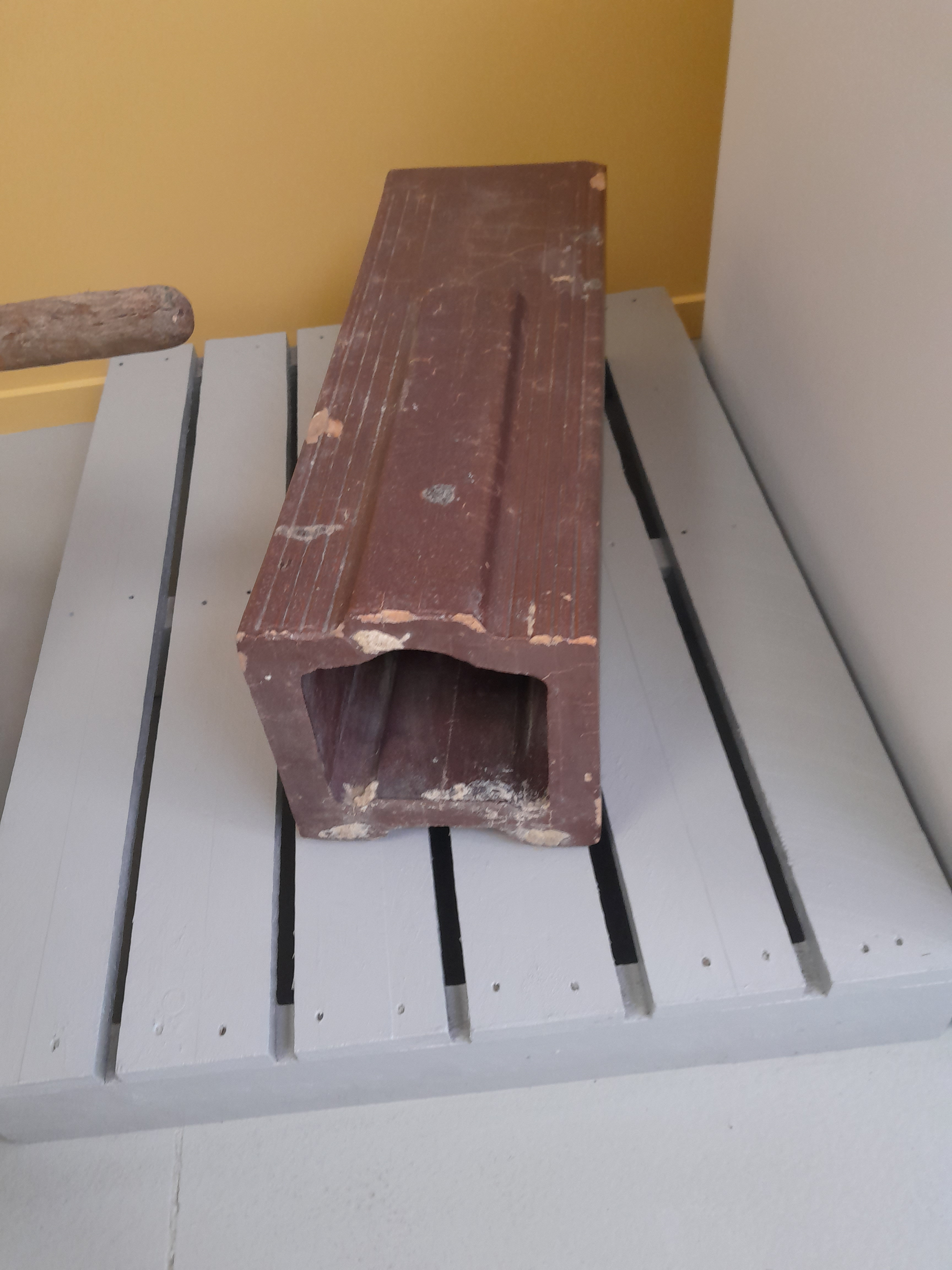
An example of the glazed hollow ceramic block used for construction of the town hall

By 1909 Warkworth had grown large enough to become a town district independent from Rodney County Council. The nascent Warkworth Town District Board raised a loan of £1200 for construction of a town hall and purchased a site on the corner of Neville and Alnwick Streets—a more central location—for £90. Arthur Bibra Herrold was hired as architect in April 1910. The tender was won by Thomas Edwin Clark; Clark patented a design by his father, Rice Owen Clark II, for a glazed stoneware hollow block—similar to concrete blocks—and taking on tenders was a way to promote the technique in hopes of improving sales for the Clark family's ceramic business. The design may have been chosen due to chairman Nathaniel Wilson's interest in the new technology as Wilson was a pioneer of concrete in New Zealand. Ultimately the design was not widely adopted and the company that produced them being liquidated in 1914. The nearby Rodney County Council Offices were also constructed with the technique but this building has been demolished.

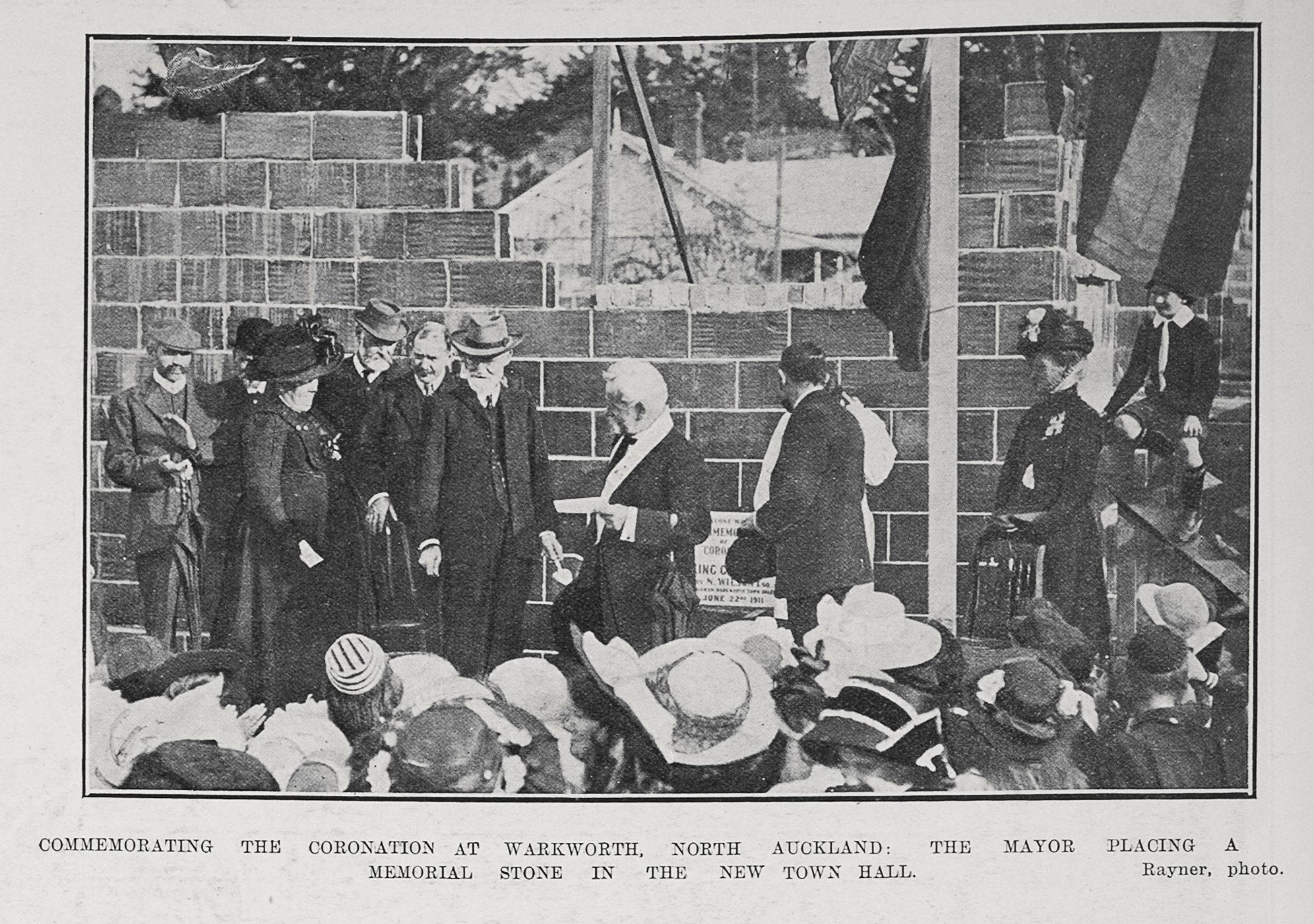
Laying of the foundation stone and celebration of the coronation of King George V

The foundation stone was laid on 22 June 1911 by chairman of the town board Nathaniel Wilson. The date coincided with the coronation of King George V and commemorations for the new king were held simultaneously. The building opened on 14 October 1911 with the former hall sold to farmers.

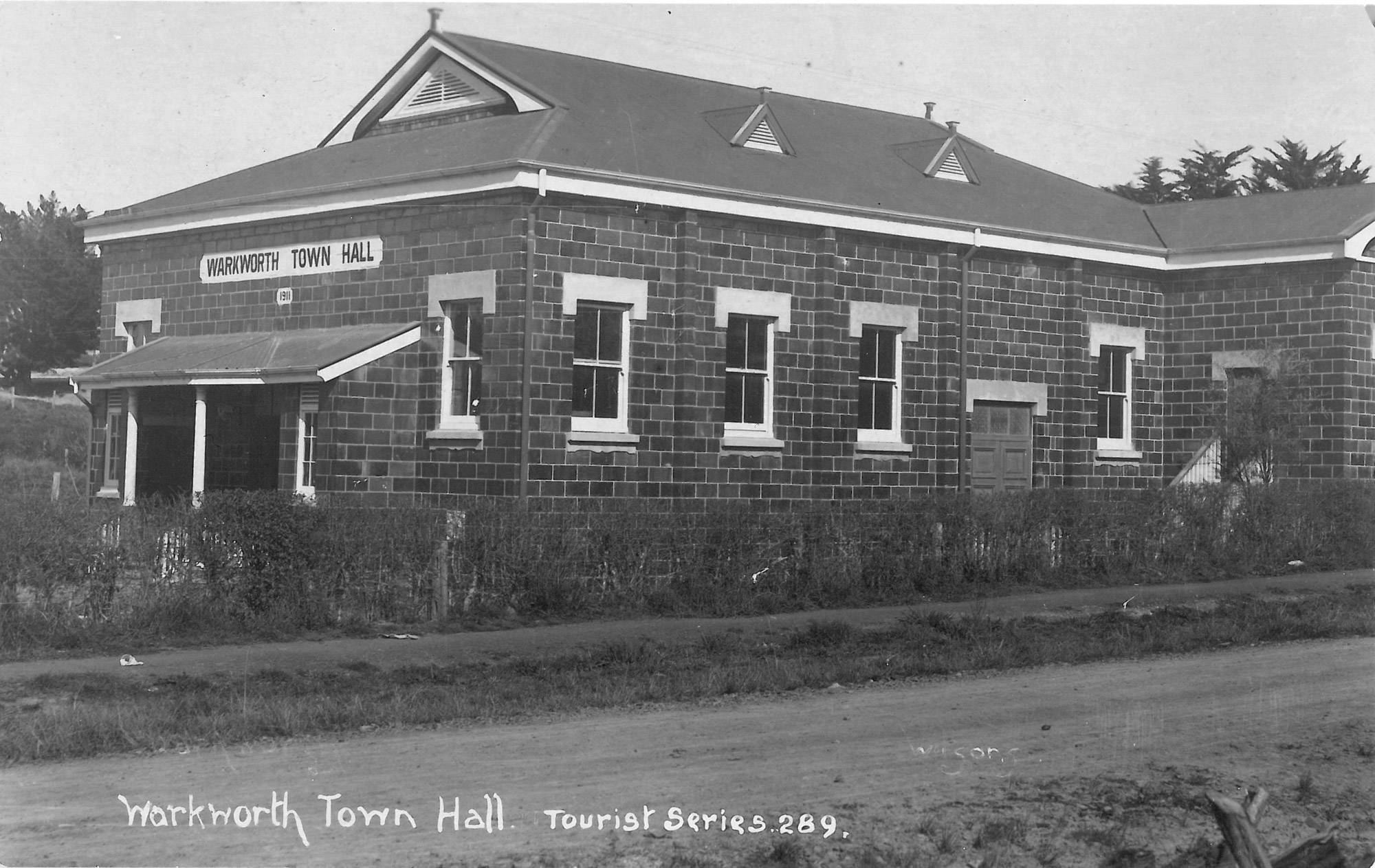
The town hall before 1918

The town hall was initially used for public meetings, celebratory events, weddings, and showing motion pictures. During the First World War soldiers were farewelled at the hall. ANZAC celebrations have been celebrated at the hall in the past. Many important events in the history of Warkworth were debated and celebrated at the town hall — including a royal visit, the establishment of a butter factory, and the introduction of electricity. A roll of honour for Rodney County was housed in the town hall until the 1950s. The roll of honour was returned to the town hall in 2017.

In the 1930s the town board decided to expand the building so it could be used to host town board meetings, which were held in a room in the library. In 1936 a £3300 loan was raised to add a strong room, meeting chambers, and clerk office. Llewelyn Piper was hired as architect and chose a modern Art Deco design for the building. The porch was demolished and most of the interior was redesigned. This Art Deco extension has been described as 'progressive' and 'modern'.

During the Second World War the Hauraki Regiment was based in Warkworth and the town hall came to be used to provide entertainment for the troops. A marquee was set up next to the hall to treat wounded servicemen. In November 1943 American soldiers were based in Warkworth further straining the capacity of the hall and leading to calls for another extension, although this did not eventuate.

The hall was pushed to capacity when a film showing the coronation of Queen Elizabeth II was screened with nearly 700 attendees. During her tour of New Zealand the queen visited Warkworth and the town hall was decorated for the occasion.

Sometime during the 1960s a concrete extension was added onto the council offices and in 1971 a kitchen was added to the southern side of the hall. As part of the 1989 local government reforms the local Warkworth council was abolished and the town came under the authority of the nascent Rodney District Council, which took over ownership of the facility but did not use the municipal offices.

In 2011 the town hall closed due to seismic concerns. A $5.6 million renovation was undertaken that included adding on a modern annexe, seismic strengthening, and the demolition of the 1960s and 1970s additions.

== Description ==
The Warkworth Town Hall occupies a central position in the town on the corners of Neville and Alnwick Streets. The original part of the building is a single-storey Arts and Crafts-style hall with a stage wing and is constructed from glazed hollow ceramic blocks. The 1937 addition is a concrete two-storey Art Deco design that dominates the Alnwick Street frontage, with a 1960 extension adding two large windows to it.

The interior of the hall is largely of Art Deco design although a few original features from the 1911 hall such as pressed metal screens still exist. The Art Deco frontage houses a lobby. Most of the rooms are part of modern extensions and are not ornately decorated unlike the lobby and hall.
