= Tudor Collins =

New Zealand seaman, photographer (1898–1970)

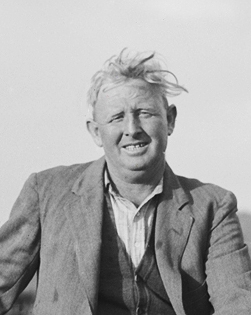
- Born: Tudor Washington Collins; 9 March 1898; Towai, Northland, New Zealand
- Died: 22 June 1970 (aged 72); Auckland
- Occupation: Photographer

Tudor Washington Collins (9 March 1898 – 22 June 1970) was a New Zealand seaman, bushman, photographer, businessman and farmer. He was born in Towai, Northland, New Zealand on 9 March 1898.

Collins was most notable for his photography of the native New Zealand bush. Many of these images were included The Story of the Kauri, by A. H. Reed which was published in 1953. Furthermore, Collins work towards protecting the Kauri trees in Warkworth was instrumental for the local community and he was honored for this contribution by the Tudor Collins Drive which was established in his memory at Parry Kauri Park. However the subject of his photographs also extended beyond the New Zealand bush. The New Zealand Herald often recruited Collins to cover current events that were taking place around the country. For example, he was one of the first photographers in Napier after the Hawke's Bay earthquake of 3 February 1931; he recorded the riots in Auckland's Queen Street on 14 April 1932; and he was the only photographer to meet the passengers and crew from the mined Niagara on 19 June 1940. US servicemen stationed at Warkworth were also photographed by Collins. Individual and group portraits were taken of the men who were preparing for their departure to the war in the Pacific. The photographs showed the rapport that Collins, described as larger than life, had established with the men. He also went to Urupukapuka Island in 1935, and took pictures of the landscape of the island. On a trip around the Pacific Ocean in 1953 he recorded Queen Elizabeth II's visit to Fiji.

Tudor Collins died in Auckland. Many of his photographs and his photographic equipment are kept at the Warkworth Museum.

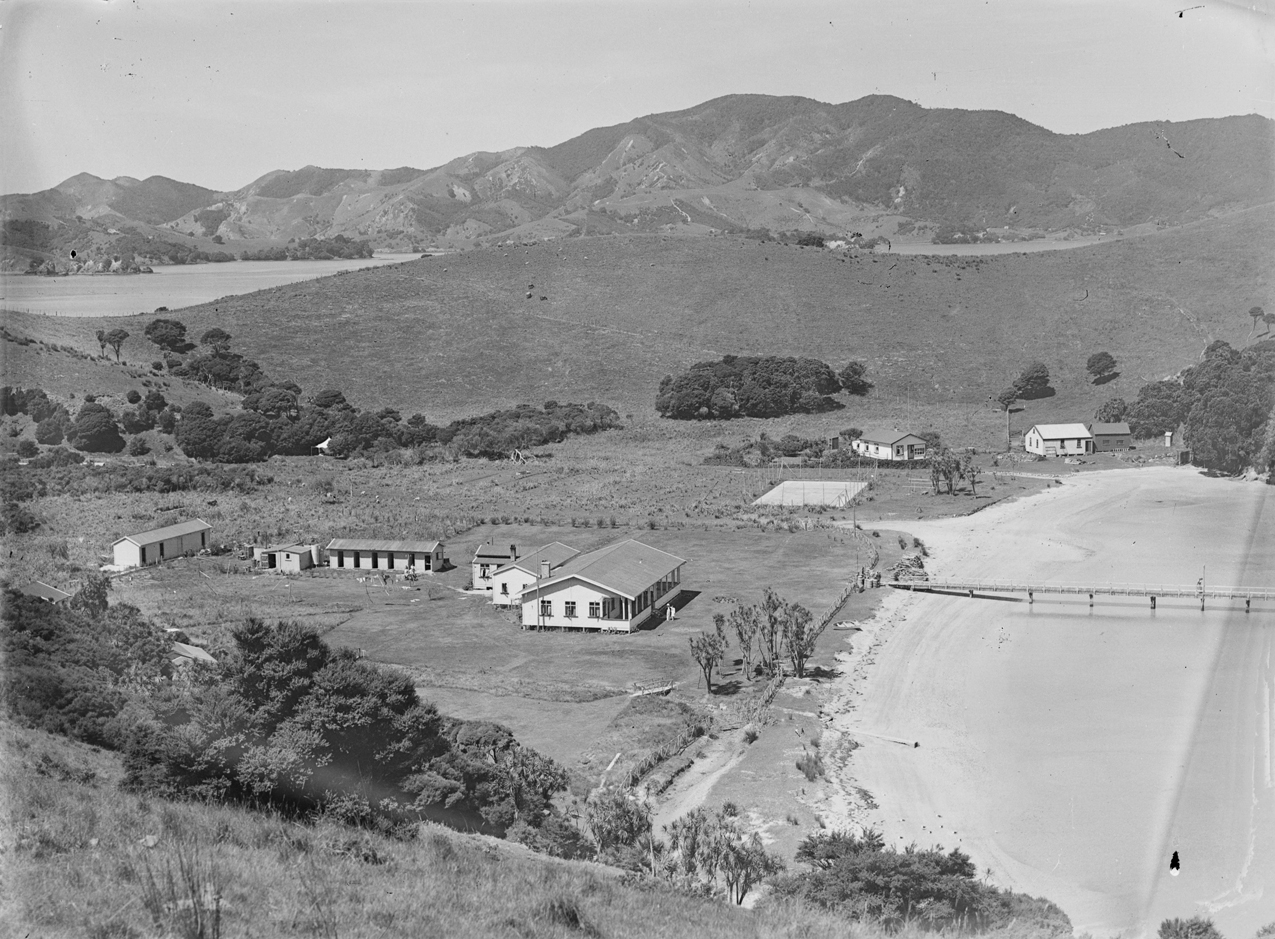
Picture of Urupukapuka Island taken by Tudor Collins in 1935
