= Bev Forrester =

New Zealand wool producer and designer

Bev Forrester MNZM
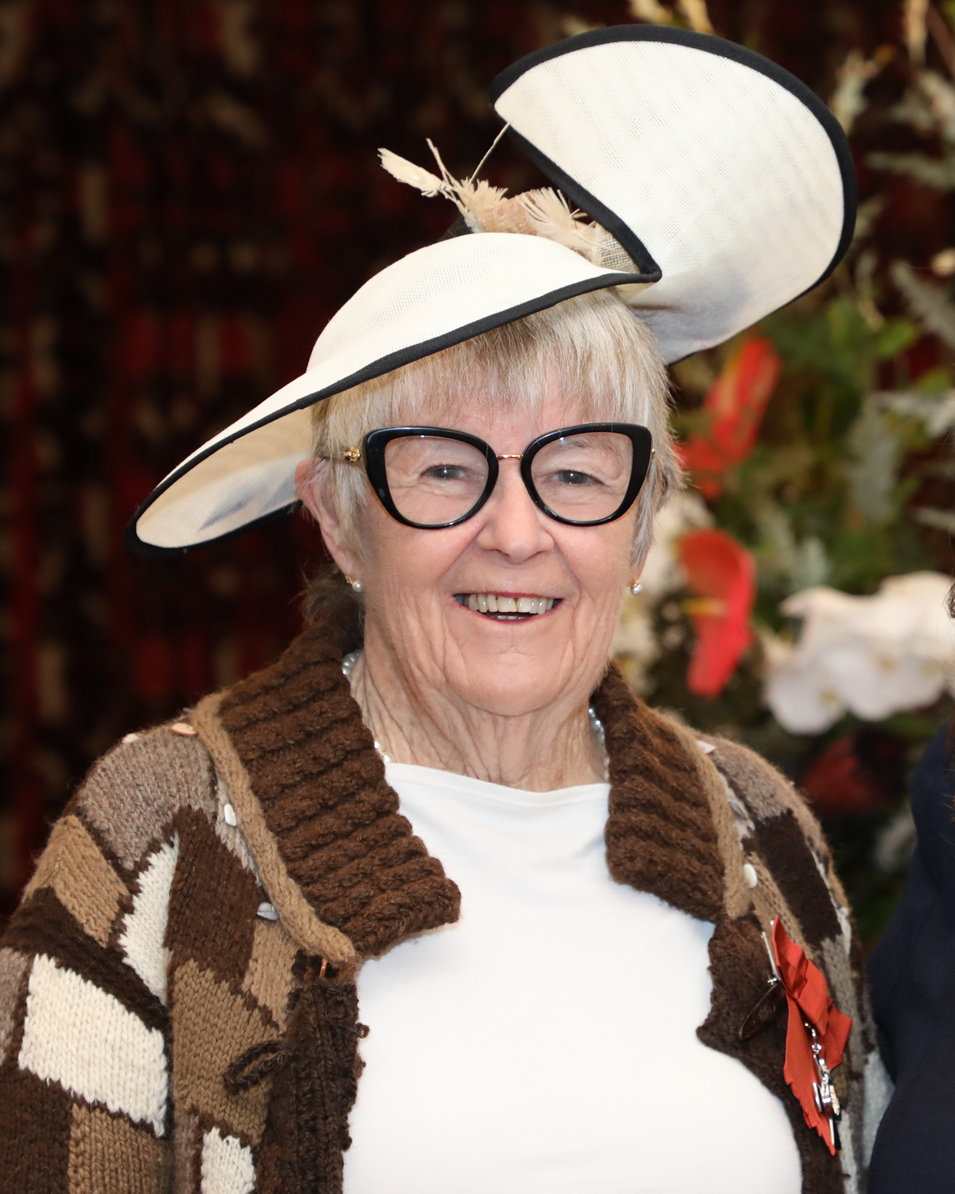
- Forrester in 2026
- Born: Beverley Riverina Price; 1951 or 1952 (age 74–75); Warkworth, New Zealand
- Occupations: Occupational therapist; farmer; fashion designer
- Spouse: Jim Forrester (m. 1986; died 1997)
- Awards: Her Business Network Award (2003); Rural Women New Zealand Enterprising Women Award (2011); New Zealand Century Farm and Station Award (2006, 2021)

Beverley Riverina Forrester MNZM (formerly Busch, née Price; born 1951 or 1952) is a New Zealand farmer, yarn producer and fashion designer. In 2026, she was appointed a Member of the New Zealand Order of Merit, for services to the wool and fashion industries.

== Early life and career ==
Forrester was born into a farming family in Warkworth in 1951 or 1952. Her parents were Ona Louisa Price (née Phillips) and Mansel Thomas Price. She entered the New Zealand School of Occupational Therapy in 1969, and after qualifying she worked as an occupational therapist for 36 years, in hospitals in Ashburton, Templeton and Christchurch. Her practice encompassed the range of psychiatric and physical disabilities.

In 1971, she became engaged to Derek Busch from Prebbleton, and they subsequently married. She remarried Jim Forrester, a sheep and beef farmer from North Canterbury in 1986 and went to live on his family farm, "Black Hills", at Hawarden. By that time, she had already begun developing her interest in wool crafts, having purchased a flock of coloured sheep in 1977.

== Farming and design career ==
While continuing to work in occupational therapy, Bev Forrester chose to farm black and coloured sheep for the purpose of wool production, focusing on undyed wool, and sustainable processing. After the death of her husband in 1997, Forrester continued to run their farm alone, while still working as a rural community therapist. Forrester exhibited her wool products internationally, and launched fashion label Beverley Riverina Knitwear, which featured at New Zealand Fashion Week and internationally. She began selling her products and knitting kits in the United Kingdom in 2007, later opening further online and physical shops, and selling in Canada and the US through distributors. Also in 2007, she was invited to present Princess Anne with a handspun and handknitted jumper during her visit to New Zealand. She lectured at the 8th World Coloured Sheep Congress in Paris in 2014. In 2023 in co-ownership, she launched a crossbred wool processing manufacturing unit in South Canterbury.

Forrester is an active member of Rural Women New Zealand, and was president of the Glenmark Branch. She created three RWNZ scholarships with the proceeds of a book she published in 2015, titled The Farm at Black Hills: Farming alone in the hills of Northern Canterbury. She is also a member of Canterbury Agricultural and Pastoral Association, and judges at international sheep shows.

Forrester credits her occupational therapy training and experience for giving her management and personal skills that proved useful in her later life. In 1999, she designed and built a house using earth bricks and wool insulation that followed the principles of accessible design; the house incorporated level entries, wide doors, and a kitchen and bathroom suitable for people living with disabilities. The house became a model for people planning a similar build, and Forrester used money raised from tours of the house to fund wheelchairs and other equipment that was loaned to disabled people in the community.

== Honours and awards ==
Forrester was awarded the Her Business Network Award at the NZ Businesswoman of the Year awards in 2003. She has participated in the Qifa Wool Awards in China, and was awarded a Rural Women New Zealand Enterprising Women Award in 2011. She was one of eight designers worldwide invited to participate in a fashion event in Italy in 2020, but the event did not happen due to COVID-19. Forrester was awarded the New Zealand Century Farm and Station Award in 2006 and again in 2021.

In the 2026 New Year Honours, Forrester was appointed a Member of the New Zealand Order of Merit for services to the wool and fashion industries.
