= Warkworth & District Museum =

Museum in Warkworth, Auckland, New Zealand

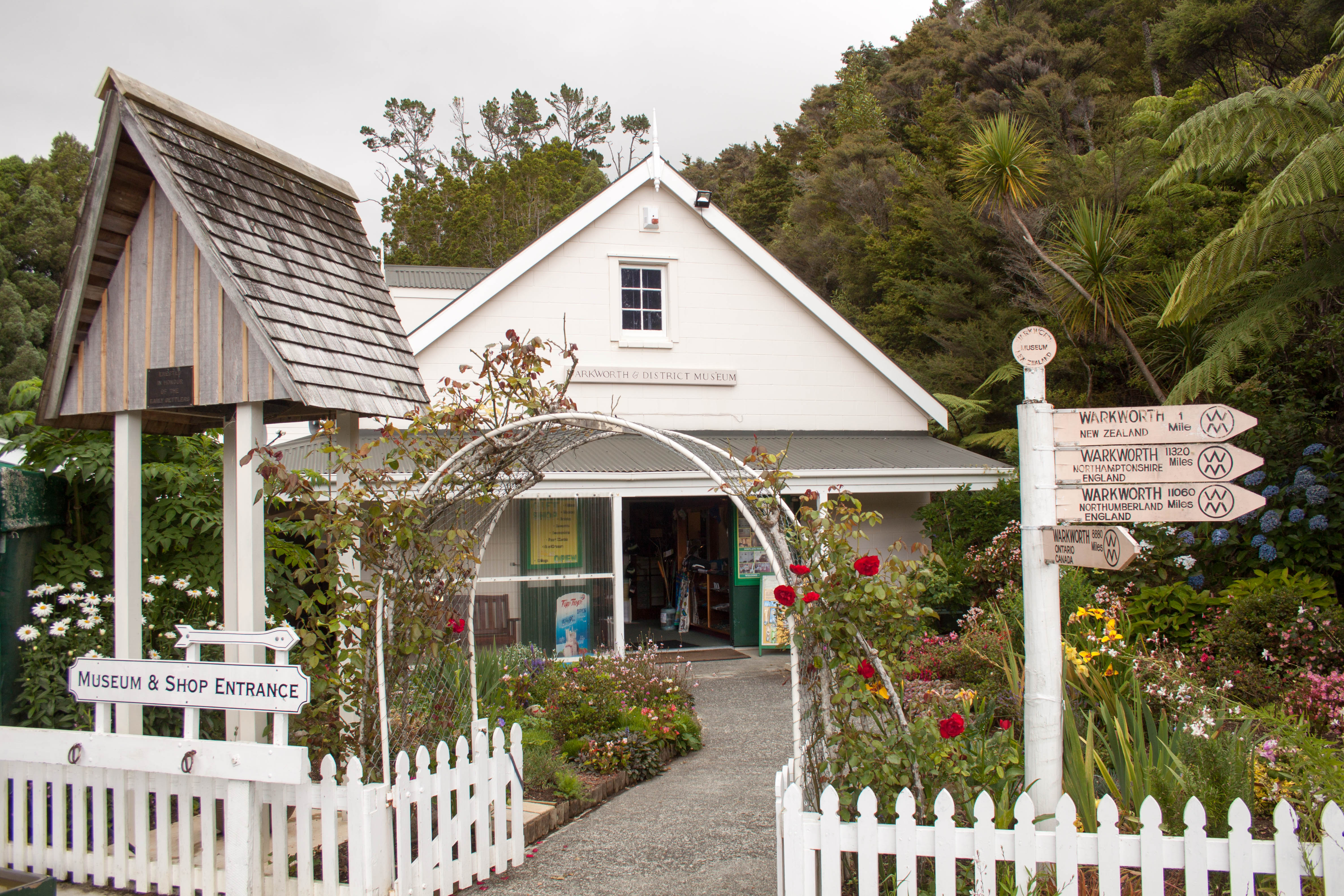
- The main entrance of the Warkworth & District Museum
- Established: September 21, 1980
- Location: Warkworth, Auckland, New Zealand
- Coordinates: 36.4162°S 174.6692°E
- Website: www.warkworthmuseum.co.nz

The Warkworth & District Museum, also known as the Warkworth Museum, is a local museum in the township of Warkworth in the Auckland Region, New Zealand. The museum focuses on the local history of the Matakana Coast area, especially the kauri logging industry.

== Location ==
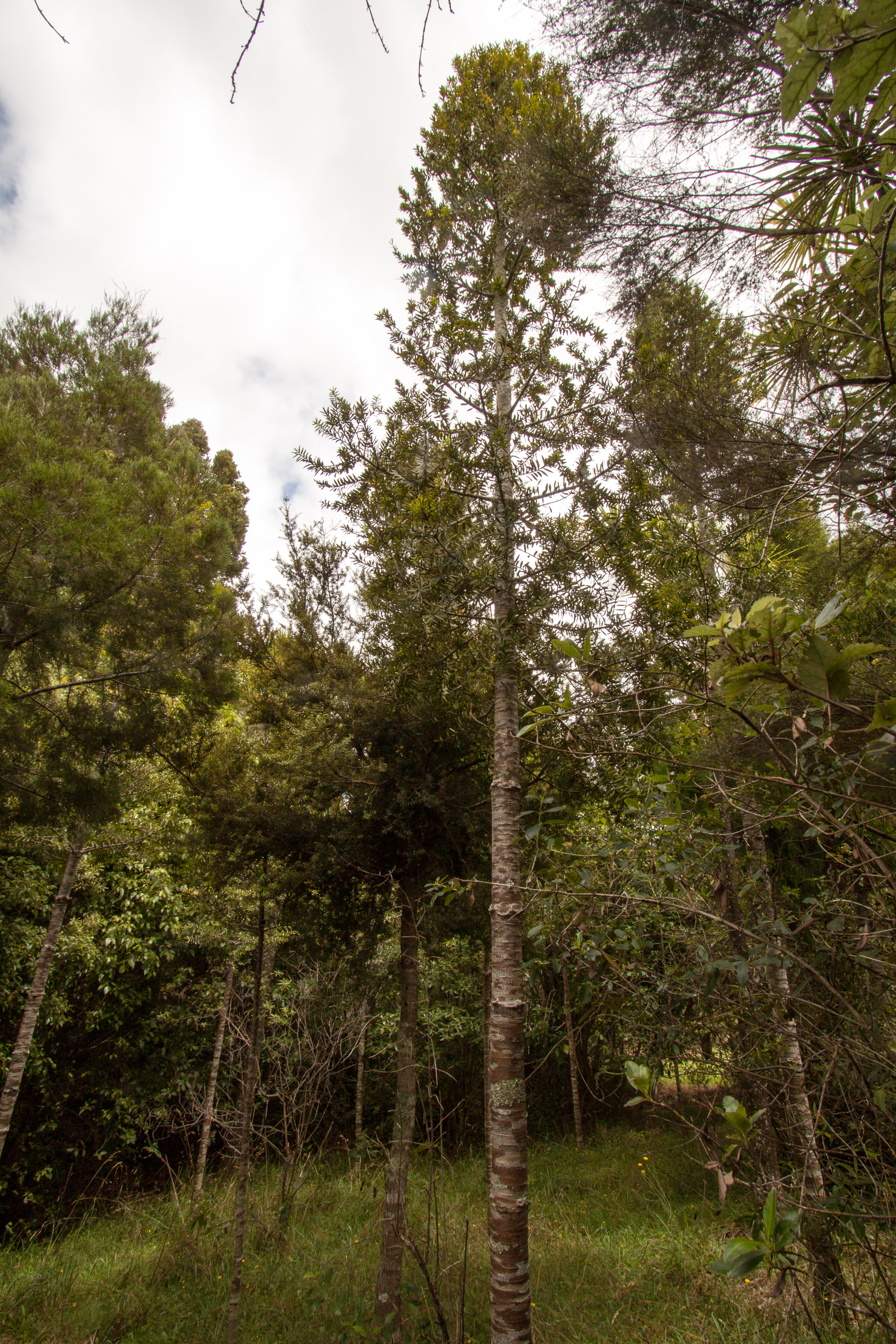
Parry Kauri Park

The museum is located to the south of the town of Warkworth in Parry Kauri Park, a two hectare kauri tree reserve. The park includes the McKinney kauri which reached a height of 38 metres (125 ft) and is estimated to be around 800 years old. The reserve features a walkway, primarily on boardwalk. The grove of kauri trees has been tended by a local organisation, the Kauri Bushmen's Association, since the 1960s.

== History ==
A museum for the Warkworth area was first discussed at a town meeting in the early 1970s by local residents Jack Keys and Ken McInnes. By 1977, fundraising and permission for the museum had been obtained. The museum incorporated as a society in 1979, opening the following year on 21 September 1980. The museum opened gradually, with the second stage, the two-storey Parry Wing, opening in 1983.

In 1998, the Founders Wing was opened by Governor General Michael Hardie Boys. Over the next seven years, small historical buildings were added to the complex, including the old Warkworth jail, a United States Military army hut from World War II, and the Mahurangi Heads Post Office.

== Displays and exhibits ==
The museum tells the history of the area, including the kauri milling era and a recreation of the town in the early 20th Century. The museum houses many photographs and photographic equipment of Tudor Collins.

The museum stores over 20,000 items.

== Gallery ==
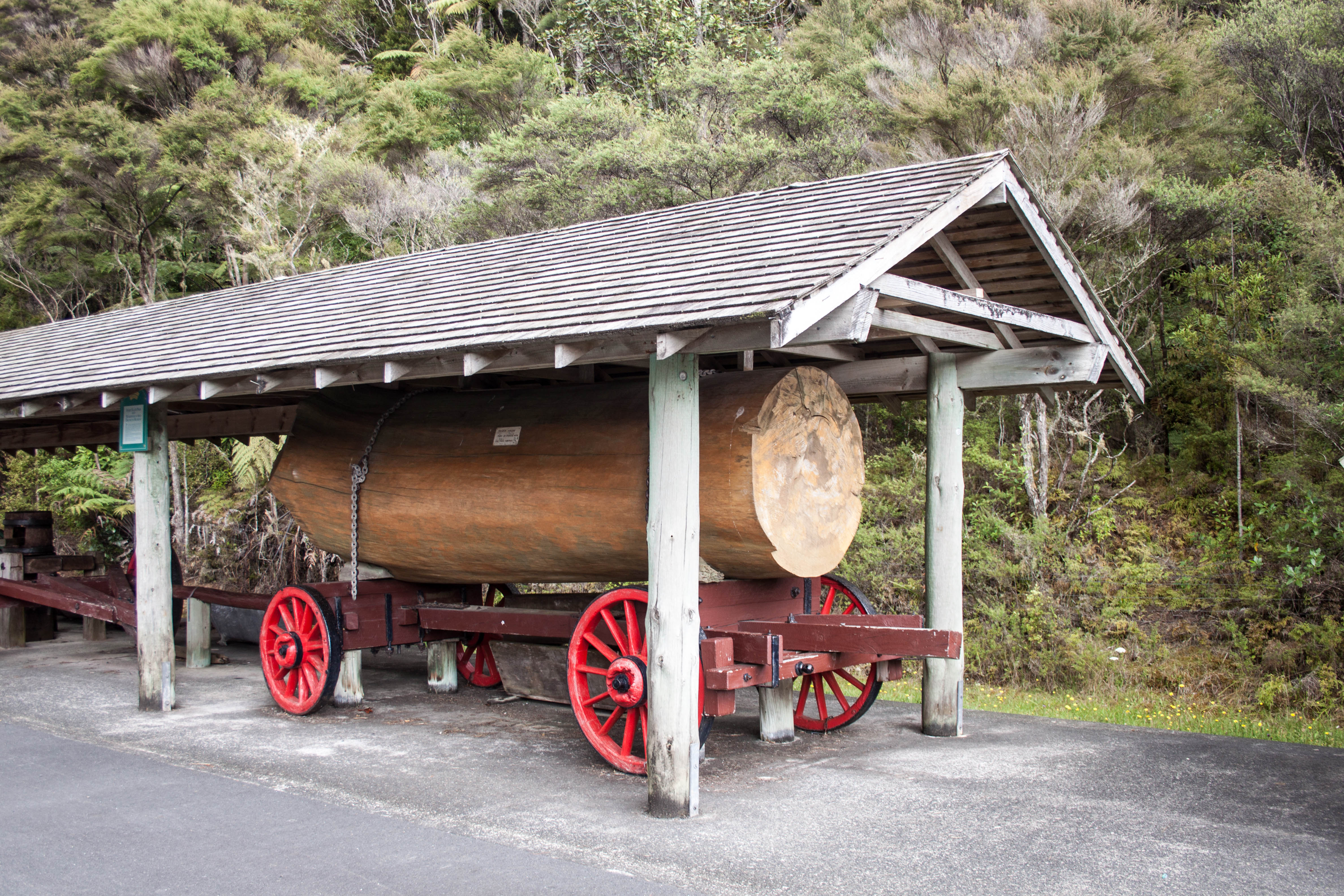
Kauri log at the Warkworth Museum

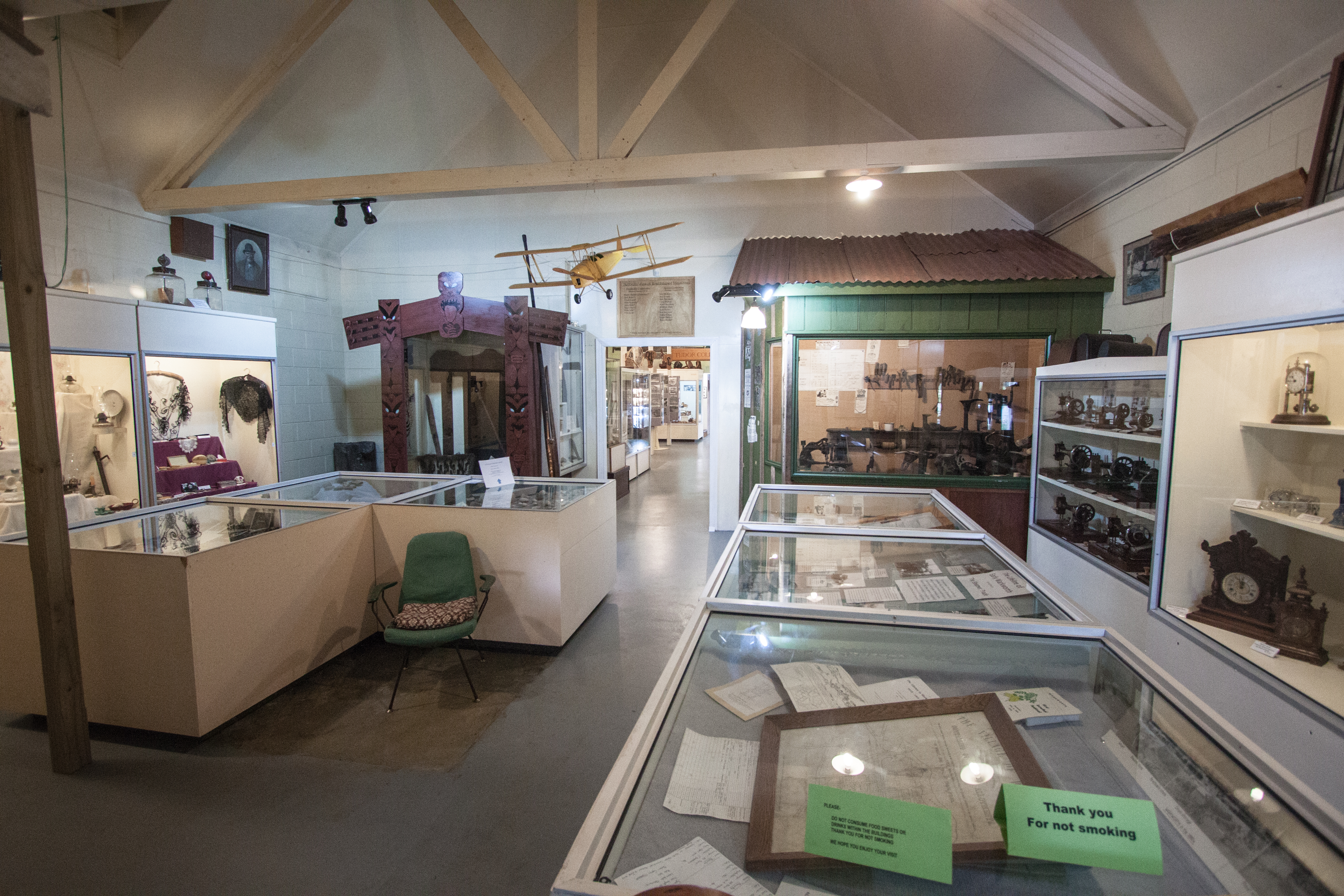
Interior of the museum

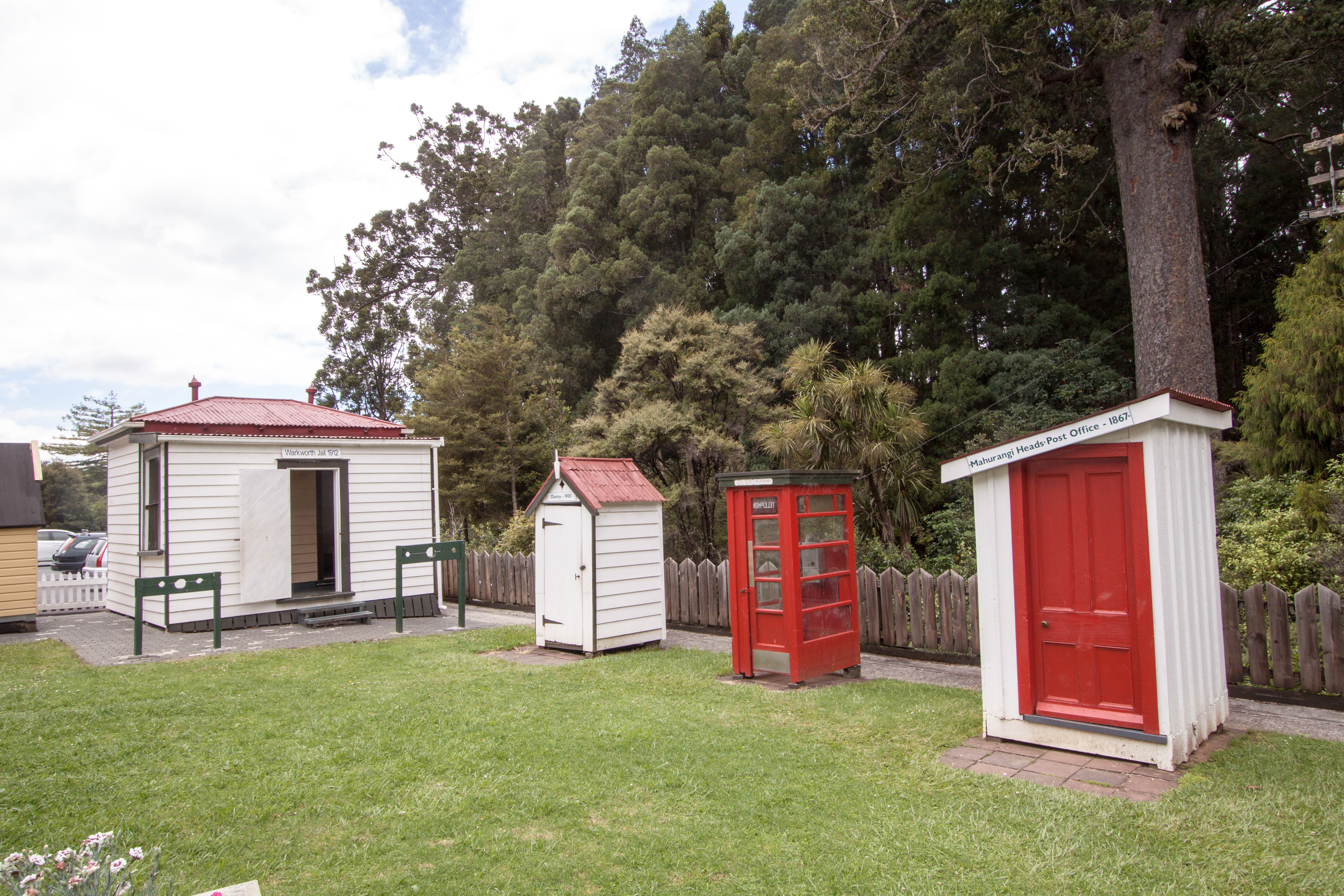
The open-air exhibition of the museum, including the old jail and the Mahurangi Heads Post Office

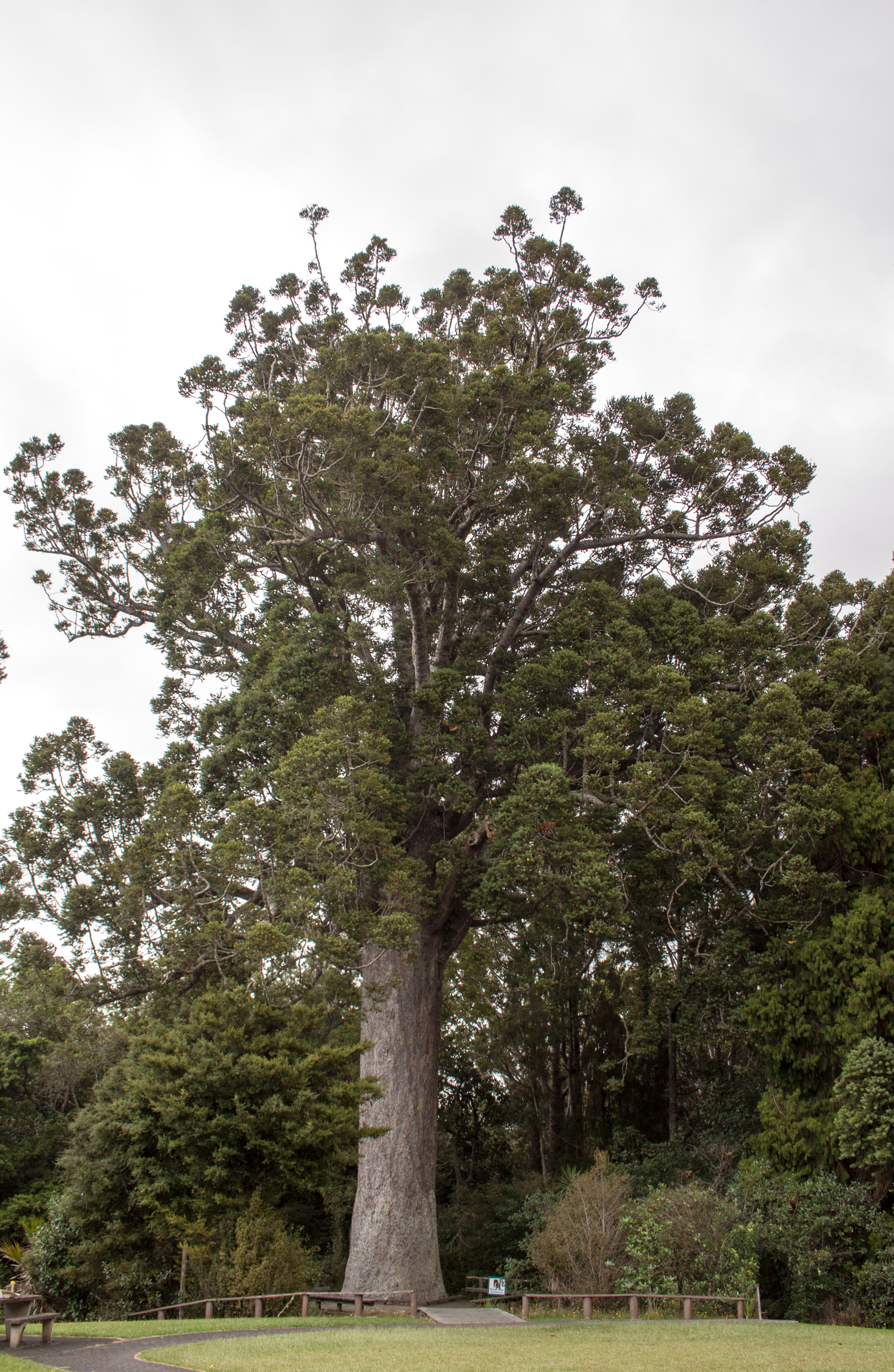
The McKinney kauri tree, one of the oldest kauri trees in the Auckland Region
