= Warkworth, New Zealand =

Warkworth Puhinui (Māori)
- Town
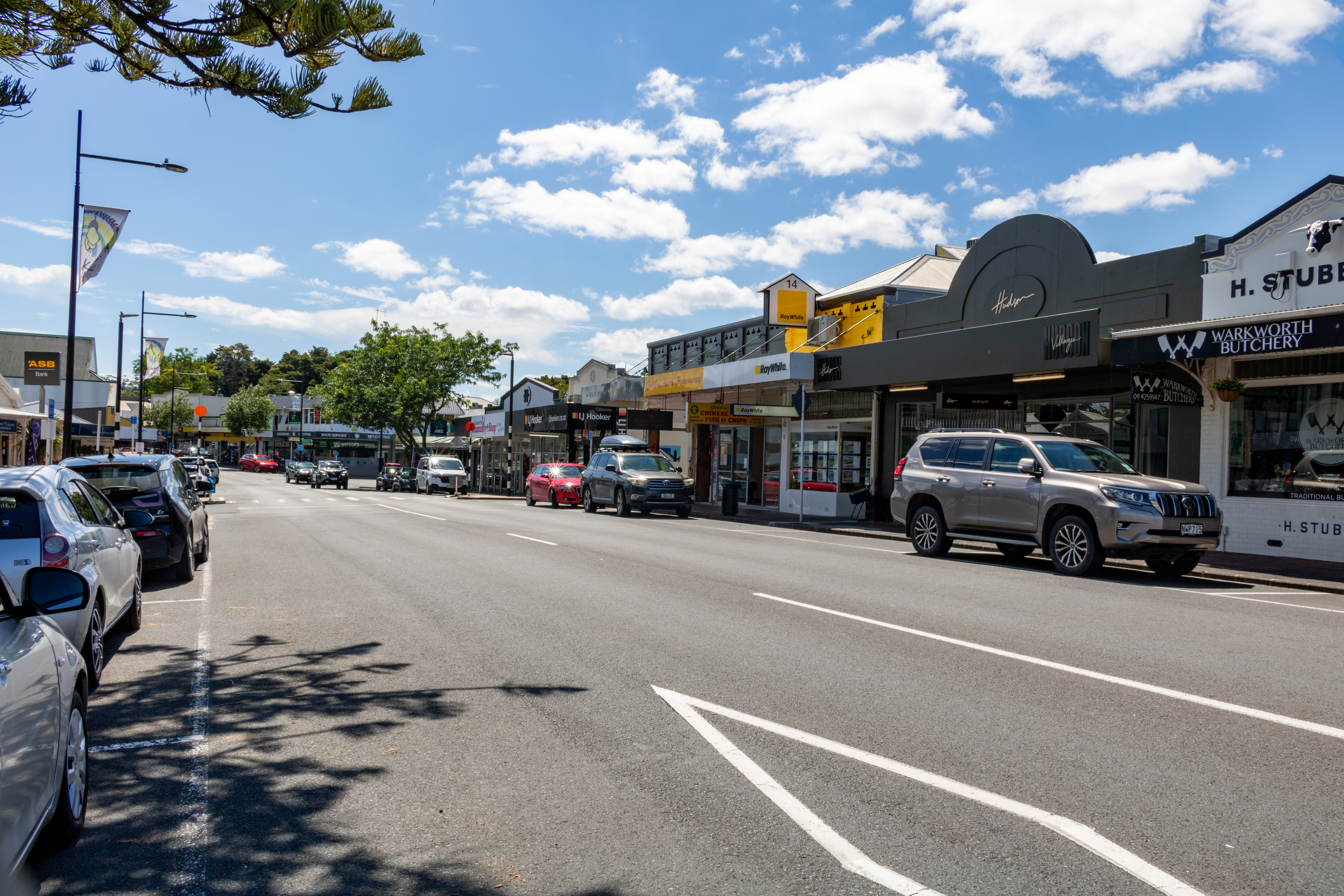
- Queen Street, Warkworth, in 2024

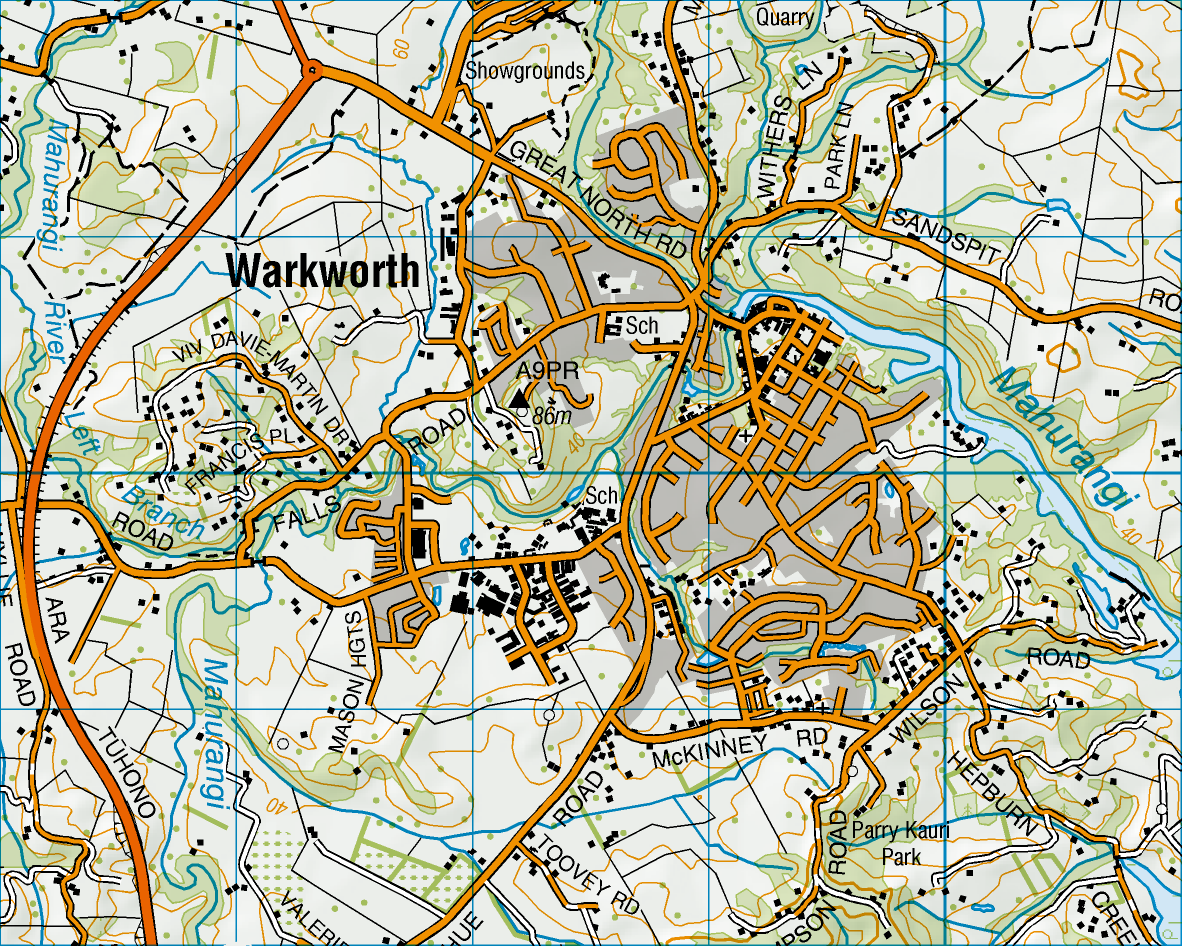

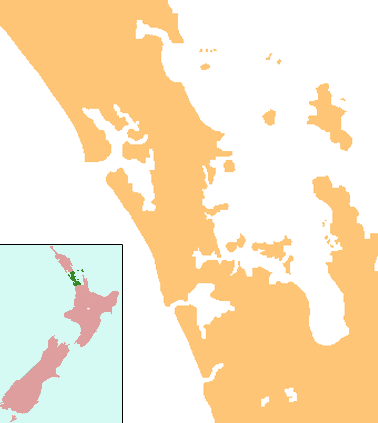
- Location within New Zealand Auckland
- Coordinates: 36°24′S 174°40′E
- Country: New Zealand
- Region: Auckland
- Ward: Rodney ward
- Local board: Rodney Local Board
- Subdivision: Warkworth subdivision
- Electorates: Kaipara ki Mahurangi; Te Tai Tokerau

Government
  - Territorial Authority: Auckland Council
  - Mayor of Auckland: Wayne Brown
  - Kaipara ki Mahurangi MP: Chris Penk
  - Te Tai Tokerau MP: Mariameno Kapa-Kingi

Area
  - Region: 15.58 km^{2} (6.02 sq mi)

Population (June 2025)
  - Region: 7,080
  - Density: 454/km^{2} (1,180/sq mi)

Warkworth (Māori: Puhinui) is a town on the Northland Peninsula in the upper North Island of New Zealand. It is in the northern part of the Auckland Region, 64 km (40 mi) north of Auckland and 98 km (61 mi) south of Whangārei, at the head of the Mahurangi River. State Highway 1 runs past it.

European settler John Anderson Brown first settled at Warkworth in 1843, establishing a timber mill on the banks of the Mahurangi River. The town was established in 1853 and became a hub for timber and shipbuilding industries. The town became a hub for the Wilsons Cement Works in 1884, after the closure and with roading improvements in the 1930s it transitioned into a commercial and service hub for the surrounding rural area. Warkworth was the main settlement in Rodney County and was the seat of local governance for many years.

Warkworth had a large American military presence during the Second World War. In the 21st century Warkworth has been expanding, with the town expected to increase up to five-fold in size.

== Etymology ==
Warkworth was named in 1854 by early settler John Anderson Brown, who took the name from Warkworth, Northumberland, allegedly because the Mahurangi River reminded him of the River Coquet at Warkworth, where a relative of Brown's worked as a school headmaster. The major streets of Warkworth were named after villages adjacent to Warkworth in England, or after major Northumbrian families. For ten years prior to this, the area was known as Brown's Mill, after the John Anderson Brown sawmill, and until the 1870s the township was primarily known by the name Upper Mahurangi.

The traditional Māori name for Warkworth is Puhinui ("Big Plume"), referring to the Puhinui Waterfalls located in the township.

== Geography ==
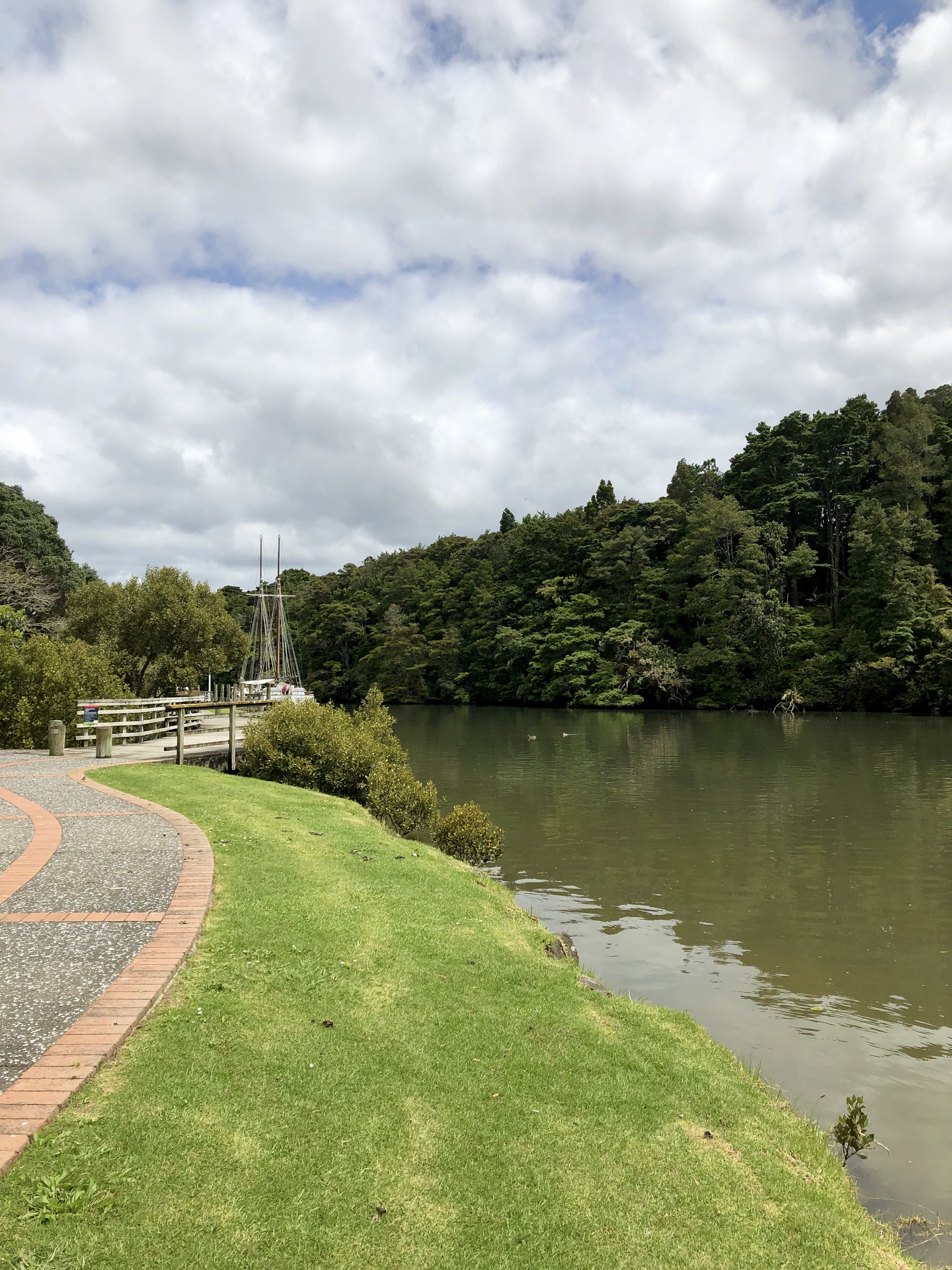
The Mahurangi River is a major waterway that flows through Warkworth

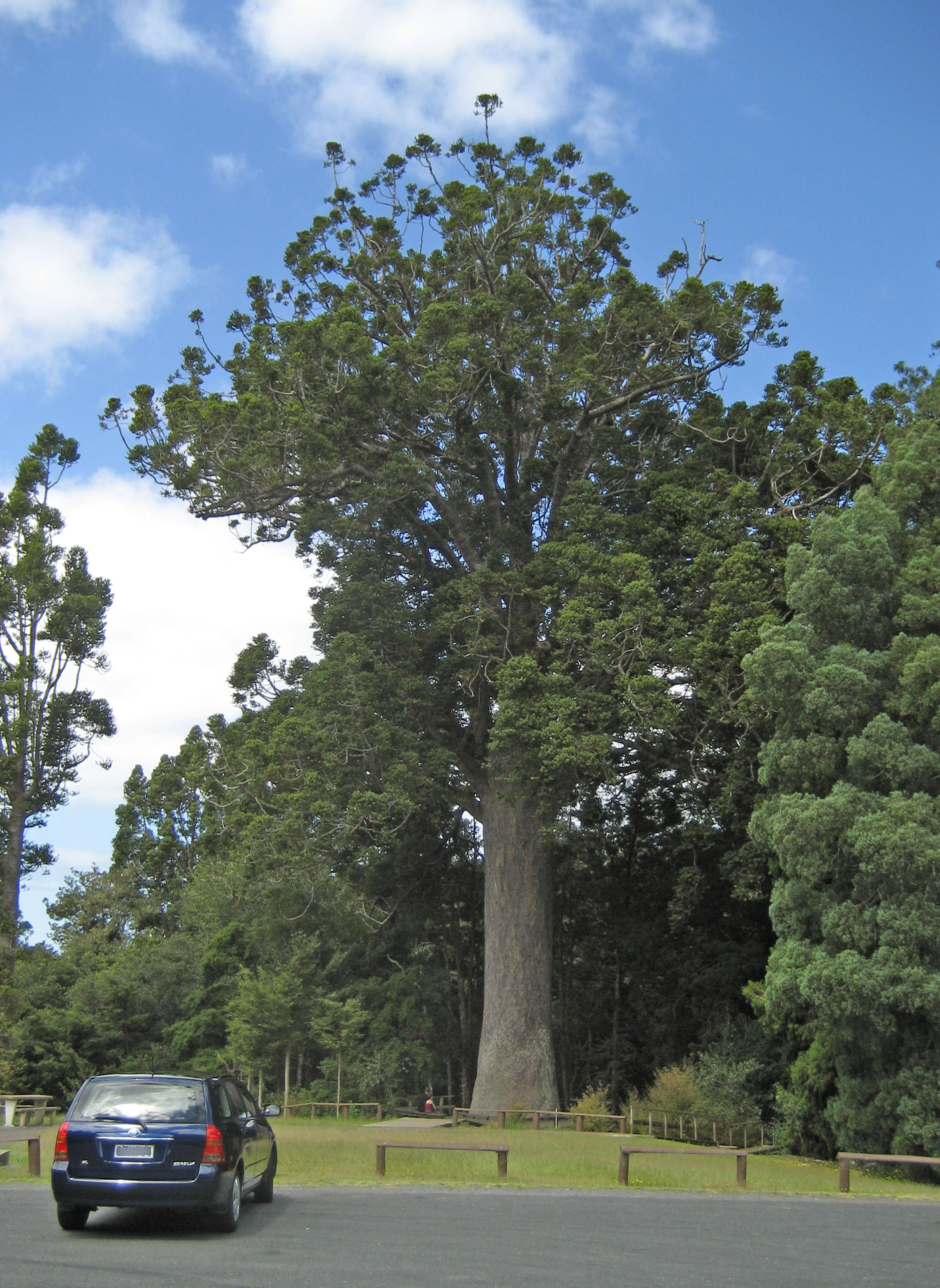
The Warkworth area was a kauri-dominated forest until the mid-19th century. Some remnant kauri trees can be found at Parry Kauri Park

The Warkworth area is at the upper navigable point of the Mahurangi River, which flows south-east towards the Mahurangi Harbour. Most of the town is located near the river, with the town centre being adjacent to the river bend. Most of Warkworth is undulating land. The wider area is predominantly uplifted Waitemata Group sandstone. Historically, the area was heavily forested until European settlement. Warkworth is a lower-lying area with mountain ranges to the north and south. The Dome, Conical Peak, Mount Tamahunga are the highest points of ranges to the north and Moirs Hill is the highest point of the range to the south.

=== Climate ===
Köppen-Geiger climate classification system classifies its climate as oceanic (Cfb), but it is rainier in winter.

Climate data for Warkworth (1991–2020 normals, extremes 1972–present)
Month	Jan	Feb	Mar	Apr	May	Jun	Jul	Aug	Sep	Oct	Nov	Dec	Year
Record high °C (°F)	29.5 (85.1)	29.5 (85.1)	28.3 (82.9)	26.5 (79.7)	22.9 (73.2)	22.2 (72.0)	19.4 (66.9)	21.8 (71.2)	23.5 (74.3)	24.6 (76.3)	26.8 (80.2)	28.4 (83.1)	29.5 (85.1)
Mean maximum °C (°F)	26.8 (80.2)	26.9 (80.4)	25.4 (77.7)	23.4 (74.1)	21.0 (69.8)	18.8 (65.8)	17.3 (63.1)	18.2 (64.8)	19.5 (67.1)	21.1 (70.0)	23.0 (73.4)	25.3 (77.5)	27.4 (81.3)
Mean daily maximum °C (°F)	23.1 (73.6)	23.6 (74.5)	22.2 (72.0)	20.0 (68.0)	17.6 (63.7)	15.3 (59.5)	14.4 (57.9)	14.9 (58.8)	16.2 (61.2)	17.6 (63.7)	19.2 (66.6)	21.4 (70.5)	18.8 (65.8)
Daily mean °C (°F)	18.5 (65.3)	18.9 (66.0)	17.5 (63.5)	15.4 (59.7)	13.4 (56.1)	11.4 (52.5)	10.4 (50.7)	10.9 (51.6)	12.2 (54.0)	13.5 (56.3)	14.9 (58.8)	17.1 (62.8)	14.5 (58.1)
Mean daily minimum °C (°F)	13.8 (56.8)	14.2 (57.6)	12.8 (55.0)	10.9 (51.6)	9.3 (48.7)	7.5 (45.5)	6.3 (43.3)	6.8 (44.2)	8.2 (46.8)	9.4 (48.9)	10.6 (51.1)	12.7 (54.9)	10.2 (50.4)
Mean minimum °C (°F)	8.2 (46.8)	9.1 (48.4)	7.5 (45.5)	4.7 (40.5)	2.8 (37.0)	0.6 (33.1)	−0.1 (31.8)	1.0 (33.8)	2.2 (36.0)	4.1 (39.4)	4.7 (40.5)	6.8 (44.2)	−0.8 (30.6)
Record low °C (°F)	5.7 (42.3)	6.6 (43.9)	4.0 (39.2)	−0.3 (31.5)	−1.4 (29.5)	−2.8 (27.0)	−2.3 (27.9)	−1.4 (29.5)	−0.5 (31.1)	1.0 (33.8)	2.7 (36.9)	3.5 (38.3)	−2.8 (27.0)
Average rainfall mm (inches)	74.2 (2.92)	85.6 (3.37)	104.9 (4.13)	112.1 (4.41)	137.9 (5.43)	156.0 (6.14)	176.2 (6.94)	149.4 (5.88)	130.3 (5.13)	95.7 (3.77)	82.5 (3.25)	102.2 (4.02)	1,407 (55.39)
Source: NIWA

== History ==
The area that became Warkworth had limited Māori occupation. The Mahurangi River was the route between the Mahurangi and Kaipara Harbours for the local tribes. This route was later used by Europeans.

=== Land sales and early colonial settlement ===
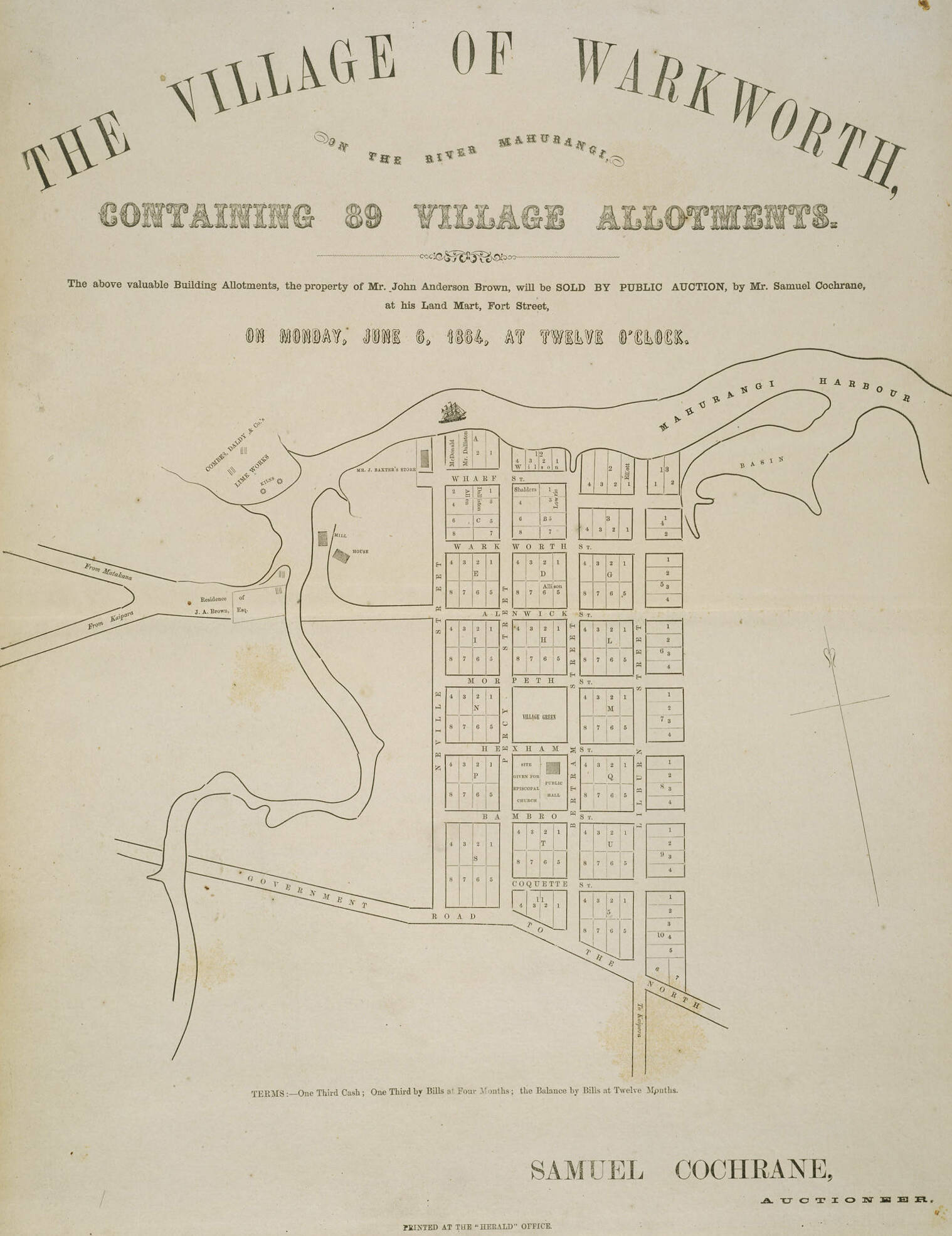
1864 advertisement for Warkworth village lots

The area that became Warkworth was part of the Mahurangi purchase made in 1841. The purchase was not finalised until 1853 and land was not subdivided nor resold until then, instead the Crown offered timber licences to settlers.

In 1843 early settler John Anderson Brown began squatting on land along the Mahurangi River, establishing a dam and timber mill on the left bank in 1844 after purchasing a timber licence. The timber industry, later joined by shipbuilding, were the two major economic activities in the area during the mid-19th century. The area of Warkworth was initially a Maori reserve but in 1853 the land was sold to the Crown for £150. In 1853 Brown was among the first land owners in the area he purchased 153 acres (62 ha) of land from the Crown. Brown subdivided part of his land on the bank of the Mahurangi river in 1854. The street layout was in a rectangular grid pattern. Growth was slow and not all lots had been sold by 1864. The town developed slowly, primarily around the Mahurangi River wharf, where settlers could supply goods and services for the Auckland market. Bridge House Lodge, established on the site of John Anderson Brown's home next door to the Warkworth Bridge, is the oldest surviving building in Warkworth.

The Mahurangi Post Office and Library were established in 1859. In the same year, the Mahurangi School opened, and by 1864 Henry Palmer had established a flour mill in the settlement. Warkworth continued to grow, becoming the largest settlement of Rodney County.

Shipbuilding declined in the area during the late 1870s, and ceased in 1880. Unlike other areas of North Auckland, kauri gum digging did not appear to play a large part in the economy of the town. Orchards were established around Warkworth, with some continuing to operate today. As forested land was cleared for shipbuilding the cleared land was developed for agriculture and orchards.

In 1864 the first public hall was constructed, remaining in use until 1911 when a replacement town hall was constructed on the corner of Alnwick and Neville Streets. In 1936 the hall was extended due to the growth of the town.

=== Lime and concrete works ===
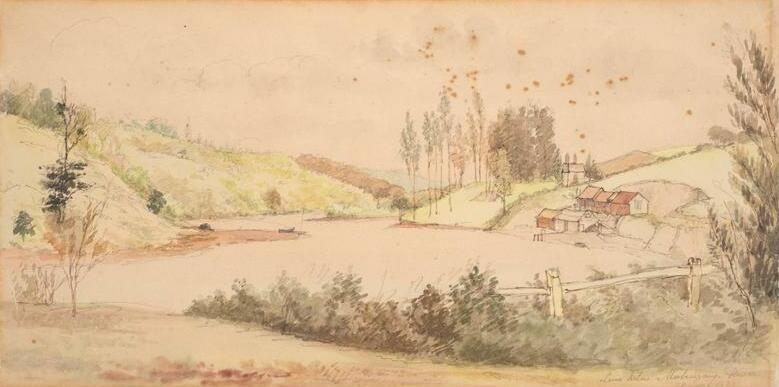
Lime Kiln, Mahurangi River (1873), watercolour by William Eastwood

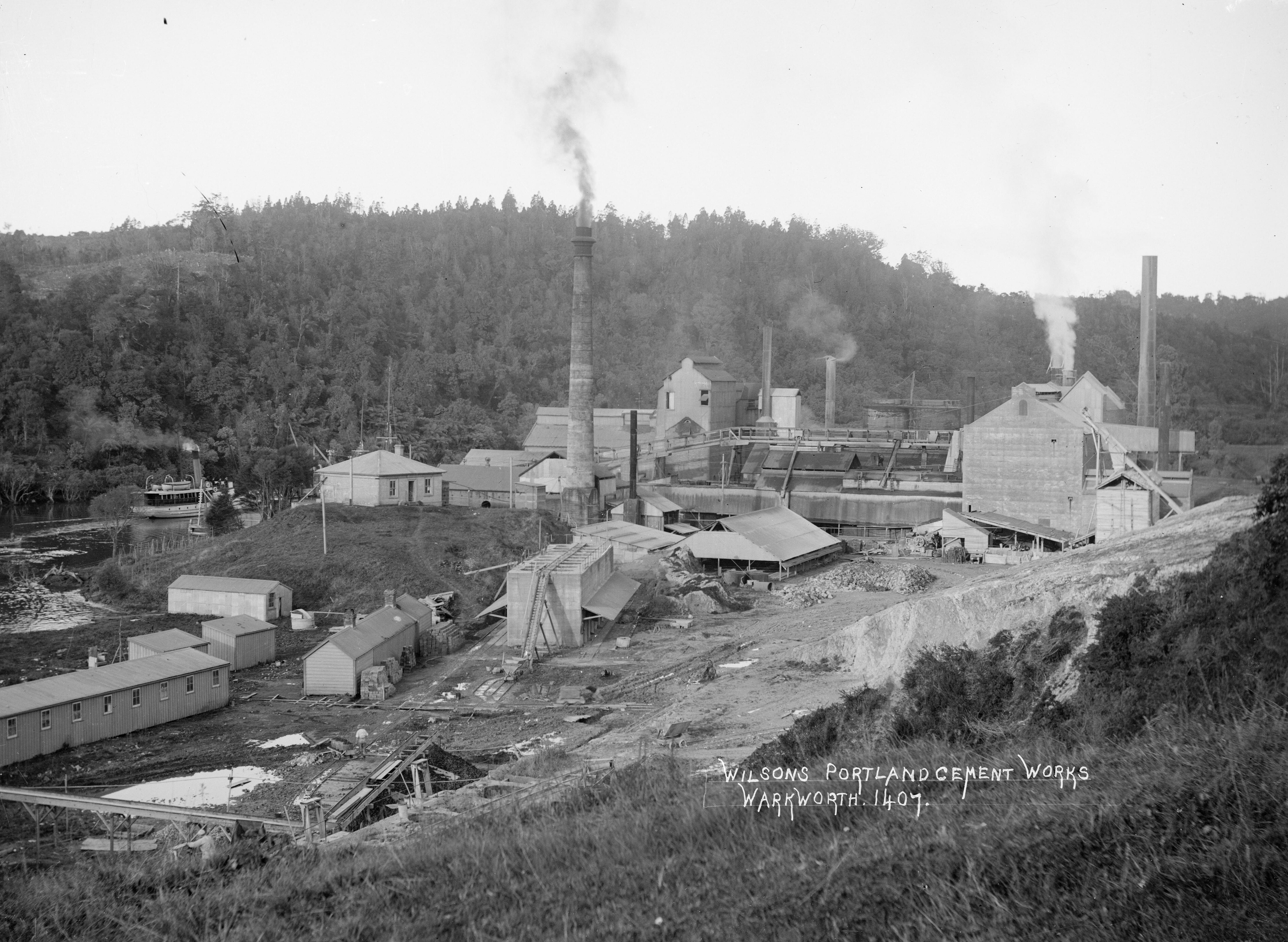
Wilson Portland Cement Works, circa 1910

John Sullivan began Warkworth's first roche lime production in 1849. Combes & Daldy were the first to produce limestone commercially, with advertisements for limestone dating back to 1850. John Southgate established a second limeworks at a site further downstream in 1857, selling it to Nathaniel Wilson in 1864.

Wilson became interested in cement in 1883 and formed the Wilsons Cement Works in 1884 with his brothers John and James. The site became the first portland cement manufacturing works in the Southern Hemisphere. The company built the Warkworth Bridge in 1899.

By 1910 the cement company had become one of the major employers in Warkworth. In 1918 it amalgamated with the New Zealand Portland Cement Company who were based in and the operation was gradually moved to Whangārei, eventually closing entirely in 1929. A separate limestone quarry to the northeast of Warkworth is still operational.

=== World War II, developing community ===
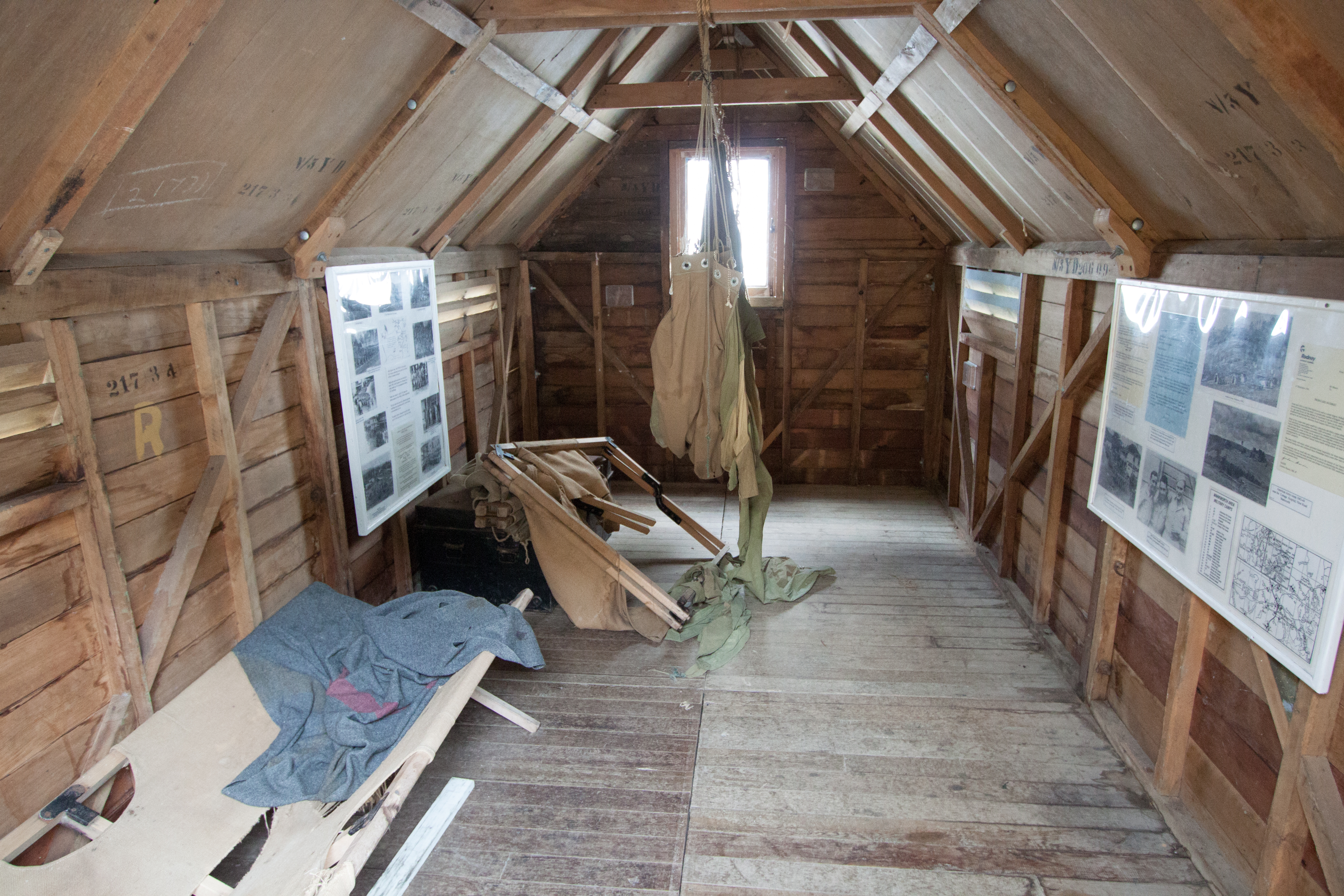
Reconstructed United States Army huts at the Warkworth Museum

In 1933 the road to Auckland had improved enough that the town no longer relied on the steamer service to transport goods, and the steamers stopped operating in 1937. After this time, Warkworth transitioned from a logging town into a commercial and service hub for the surrounding area. Logging continued at Warkworth until the 1930s.

During World War II, Warkworth and the surrounding area became home to over 40 camps for United States Army servicemen, including the 3rd Marine Division, 25th Infantry Division and the 43rd Infantry Division. The first personnel to arrive were the 43rd Infantry Division in October 1942, and camps included the modern-day Rodney Showgrounds, and a military hospital that was constructed near Hill Street. The historic cement works, which had been closed since 1928, was used as demolition practice by the servicemen. Some of the 3rd Marine Division servicemen were stationed in Warkworth. The Warkworth Town Hall was used to stage entertainment for the servicemen. By 1944 when the United States Army had left, the New Zealand Army requisitioned many of the camps.

In 1971 the Warkworth Radio Astronomical Observatory was established near the town, as the first major long-range telecommunication centre for satellite telephone circuits and television in New Zealand. By 2010, the facility had been redeveloped as an AUT radio observatory.

The Warkworth & District Museum, a local museum showcasing local history, opened in 1980.

Warkworth saw significant suburban housing growth between 2008 and 2018, with the population increasing by 61% between 2006 and 2018. In 2023, the Puhoi to Warkworth section of the Auckland Northern Motorway was opened, diverting traffic away from Warkworth. Warkworth is expected to grow from around 5,000 residents to 25,000–30,000. The town is currently zoned for 7,500 dwellings. Warkworth is the largest town between Auckland and Whangarei.

== Local government ==
The first local government for the township was the Upper Mahurangi Highway District, which was formed on 24 December 1864. It was one of the first highway districts to form north of the city of Auckland, and was formed to administer the road upkeep costs in the area. With the abolition of the provinces of New Zealand in 1876, Warkworth became part of Rodney County. The highway district was merged with the Lower Mahurangi Highway District in 1903 and it became the Warkworth Road Board. In 1908 the road board became a town board, and in 1954 it became a town council following the Municipal Corporations Act. In 1976 Warkworth became a district community council of Rodney County. From 1989 to 2010, Warkworth was part of Rodney District.

In November 2010, all city and district councils in the Auckland Region were merged into a single unitary authority, Auckland Council, with Warkworth in the Rodney Local Board area.

Warkworth has served as the seat of local governance in the area since the Upper Mahurangi Highway Board was established in 1864. The Rodney County Council offices were initially based in Warkworth. The Rodney Local Board has been based in Warkworth since 2023.

== Demographics ==
Warkworth is described by Statistics New Zealand as a small urban area. It covers 15.58 km^{2} (6.02 sq mi) and had an estimated population of 7,080 as of June 2025, with a population density of 454 people per km^{2}.

Historical population
Year	Pop.	±% p.a.
2006	3,462	—
2013	4,269	+3.04%
2018	5,586	+5.52%
2023	6,675	+3.63%

Warkworth had a population of 6,675 in the 2023 New Zealand census, an increase of 1,089 people (19.5%) since the 2018 census, and an increase of 2,406 people (56.4%) since the 2013 census. There were 3,231 males, 3,429 females and 15 people of other genders in 2,571 dwellings. 2.4% of people identified as LGBTIQ+. The median age was 43.2 years (compared with 38.1 years nationally). There were 1,233 people (18.5%) aged under 15 years, 948 (14.2%) aged 15 to 29, 2,742 (41.1%) aged 30 to 64, and 1,749 (26.2%) aged 65 or older.

People could identify as more than one ethnicity. The results were 82.9% European (Pākehā); 10.7% Māori; 7.3% Pasifika; 8.4% Asian; 1.3% Middle Eastern, Latin American and African New Zealanders (MELAA); and 2.1% other, which includes people giving their ethnicity as "New Zealander". English was spoken by 95.9%, Māori language by 1.3%, Samoan by 0.1%, and other languages by 13.7%. No language could be spoken by 2.3% (e.g. too young to talk). New Zealand Sign Language was known by 0.3%. The percentage of people born overseas was 30.7, compared with 28.8% nationally.

Religious affiliations were 37.3% Christian, 1.3% Hindu, 0.5% Islam, 0.4% Māori religious beliefs, 0.8% Buddhist, 0.5% New Age, and 1.3% other religions. People who answered that they had no religion were 51.2%, and 7.1% of people did not answer the census question.

Of those at least 15 years old, 834 (15.3%) people had a bachelor's or higher degree, 2,856 (52.5%) had a post-high school certificate or diploma, and 1,458 (26.8%) people exclusively held high school qualifications. The median income was $38,300, compared with $41,500 nationally. 630 people (11.6%) earned over $100,000 compared to 12.1% nationally. The employment status of those at least 15 was that 2,511 (46.1%) people were employed full-time, 711 (13.1%) were part-time, and 90 (1.7%) were unemployed.

Individual statistical areas
Name	Area (km^{2})	Population	Density (per km^{2})	Dwellings	Median age	Median income
Warkworth West	11.36	2,775	244	1,125	47.8 years	$35,000
Warkworth East	4.22	3,900	924	1,446	40.6 years	$40,700
New Zealand					38.1 years	$41,500

== Education ==
The first school in Warkworth was the Mahurangi School, established in 1863.

=== Mahurangi College ===
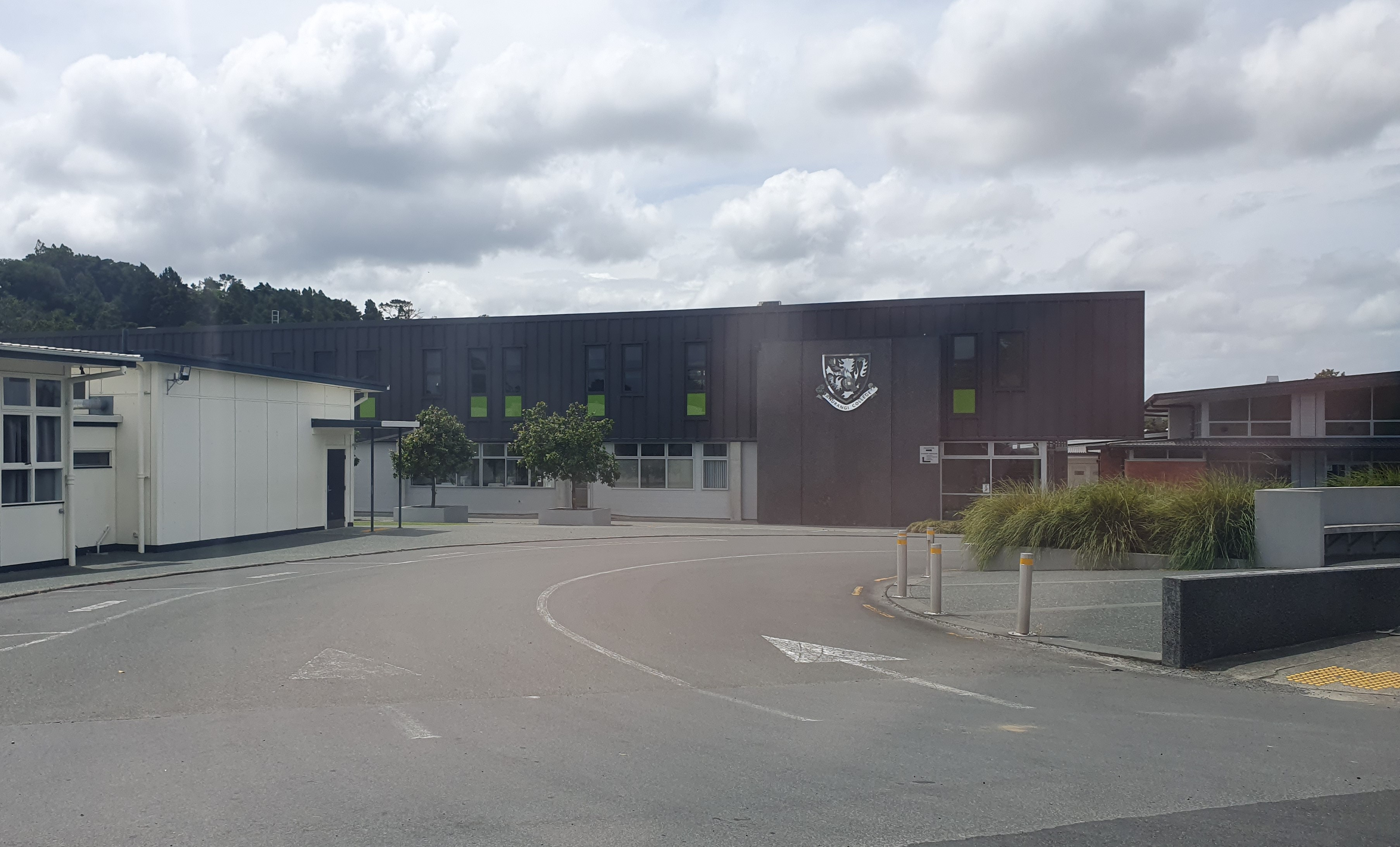
Mahurangi College

Mahurangi College is a co-educational secondary school, teaching students between years 7–13 (form 1–7, grade 6–12), with a roll of 1,581 students as of July 2026. It was first built on the current site in 1957, and was then called Warkworth District High School. It was renamed Mahurangi College in 1962, and had a roll of 210 students at the time.

=== Warkworth School ===
Warkworth School is a co-educational primary (years 1–6) school with a roll of 626 students as of July 2026.

== Economy ==
Warkworth is both a service town for the wider area and a satellite town of Auckland. The nearby surrounds are a mix of industrial, horticulture, and agricuture.

== Sports ==
Mahurangi RFC is the local rugby club, formed in 1989 as an amalgamation of three local rugby clubs: Warkworth, Kaipara Flats and Omaha.

== Morrison's Orchard ==
Edward Morrison established the Red Bluffs Orchard near Hepburn Creek in the 1870s on a 4 acre site. Morrison created new varieties and was a very successful orchadist; by 1914 Morrison had 250,000 trees covering 57 hectares (140 acres) — the largest orchard in New Zealand. Red Bluffs closed in 1919; however, the Morrison family established another orchard in 1935, Kenilworth. Kenilworth is a 40 acre orchard that is still operating. Both the Morrison family and the Warkworth public support retaining the orchard through the urbanisation and expansion of the town.

== Notable buildings ==
The Warkworth town centre has a high proportion of historic buildings including: the Warkworth Town Hall, Warkworth Post Office, Broomfield House, Warkworth Masonic Hall, St Columba's Church, and the Warkworth Hotel. Other historic places in Warkworth include the ruins of the Wilsons' cement works, Riverina, and the Wilsons' Manager's House.

== Kōwhai festival ==
Warkworth has a festival celebrated when kōwhai trees start to drop their flowers (September–October). Thousands of visitors come to see the festival which features old horse carriages, markets, and bands.

== Notable residents ==
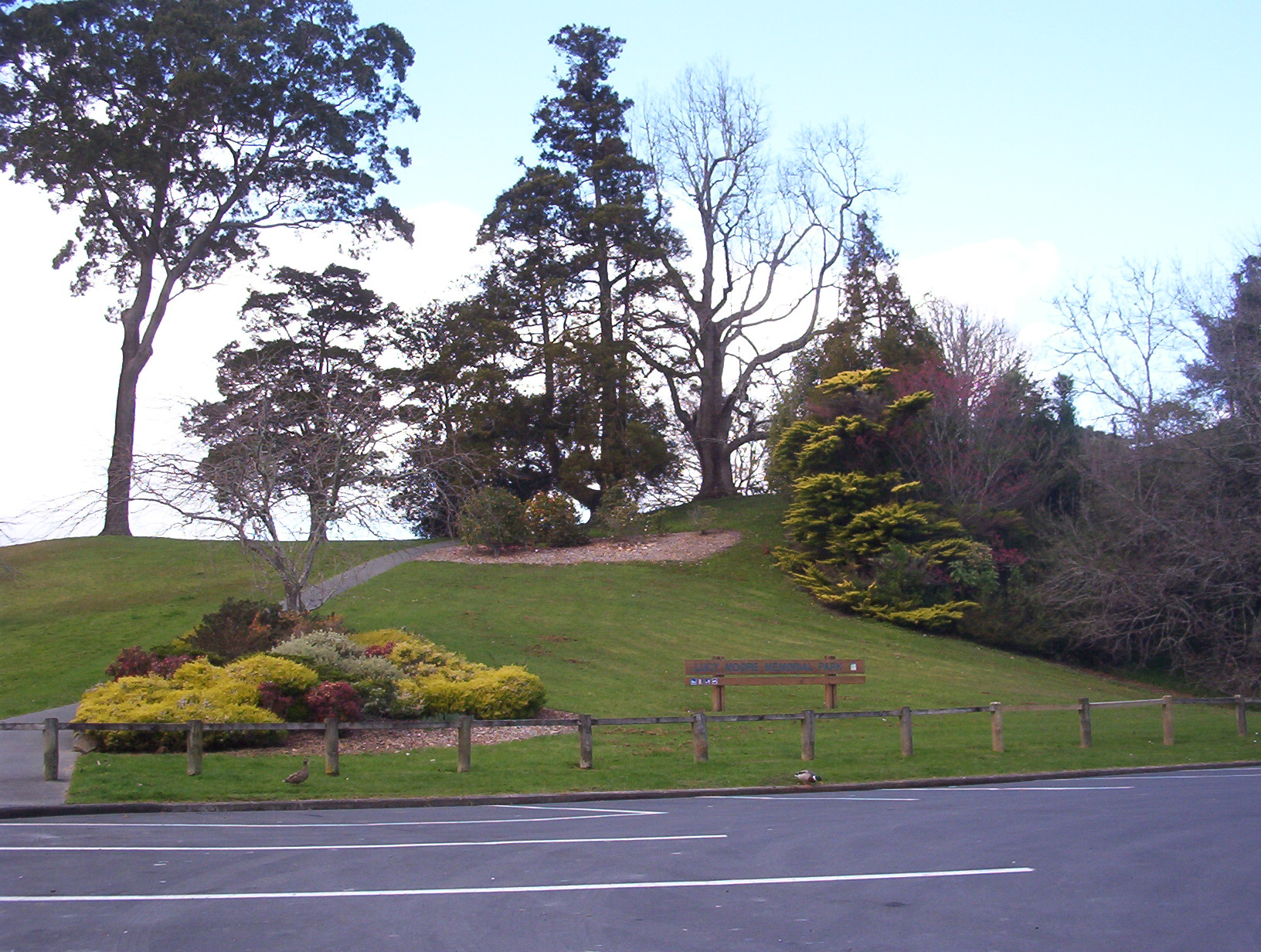
Lucy Moore Memorial Park

- Lucy Moore was a botanist and descendant of a pioneer family. The Lucy Moore Memorial Park was named in her honour.
- Harry Parry (?–1977) was a supporter of obtaining land for a park with kauri trees. The Parry Kauri Park is named in his honour.
- Serj Tankian singer and songwriter, member of System of a Down.
- Conrad Robertson olympic gold medalist.
- Bev Forrester, yarn producer and fashion designer, was born in Warkworth.

== Transportation ==
State Highway 1 passed through Warkworth until an extension of the Auckland Northern Motorway opened in July 2023. The new extension ends just north of Warkworth.

Auckland Transport operatives bus services to Snells Beach, Omaha, Wellsford, and to the Hibiscus Coast busway station. There are no local services for transport around the town itself. InterCity buses run through Warkworth from Auckland to Kerikeri and Mahu City Express twice a day to Auckland.

== Sister towns ==
Warkworth has several sister towns including:

- Warkworth, Northumberland (Town founder John Anderson Brown named Warkworth after his former home in England)
- Furudono, Fukushima (Furudono is a sister school of Mahurangi College and Warkworth Primary School located in Honshū, Japan)
- Warkworth, Ontario (This town in Canada was sistered in 2003)

== Bibliography ==
- Stone, R. C. J. (2001). From Tamaki-makau-rau to Auckland. Auckland University Press. ISBN 1869402596.
