= Nathaniel Wilson (entrepreneur) =

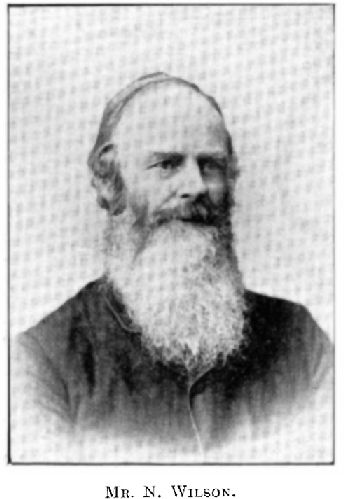
Nathaniel Wilson, circa 1902.

Nathaniel Wilson (1836–23 September 1919) was an entrepreneur considered the 'father of cement' in New Zealand. Wilson initially trained as a cobbler before heading to the Victorian goldfields. He later returned to New Zealand and moved in with his family on a farm near Warkworth. Wilson plied his trade as a cobbler before a bout of ill health led him to purchase a farm. Wilson discovered lime deposits on his farm and started a company with his brothers to supply lime. Wilson began to experiment with cement production and was the first to produce Portland cement in the Southern Hemisphere. His business grew to become the largest cement company in New Zealand. Wilson constructed many buildings with concrete, including his own retirement home, Riverina. In addition to his business adventures Wilson was a prominent local politician serving as chairman of the Rodney County Council and Warkworth Town Board.

== Early life ==
Nathaniel Wilson was born in 1836 in Glasgow, Scotland. Wilson arrived in New Zealand with his family on 9 October 1842 aboard the Duchess of Argyle. Wilson's father William was a blacksmith with the Imperial Forces and was based in Auckland. William took his family to Kawau Island where he worked as a blacksmith for a copper mining company. After the closure of the mines in the 1850s the family moved back to Auckland. Wilson apprenticed as a cobbler before moving to the Victorian goldfields.

== Warkworth ==
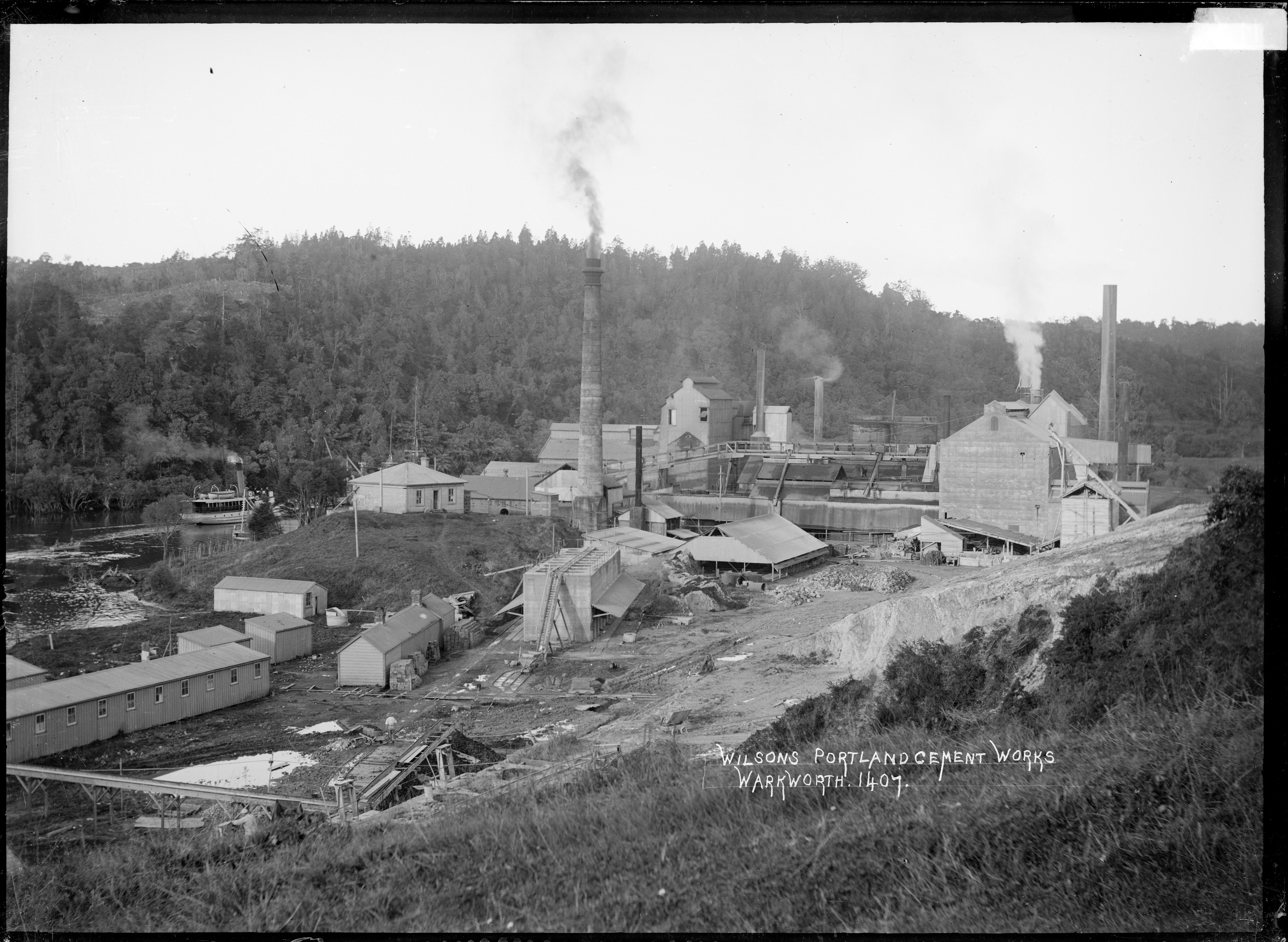
The cement works c.1910

In 1858 Wilson returned to New Zealand and moved in with his family on a 130 acres (53 ha) farm just outside Warkworth, working as a cobbler. Wilson's health declined and his doctor recommended he pursue an outdoor life; in 1864 Wilson purchased a 100 acres (40 ha) property near Waihe Creek and began farming. Wilson found lime deposits on his farm and began experimenting with his first lime kilns in 1865 or 1866. Wilson originally produced lime for use in his agricultural activities rather than seeing it as a commercial venture. Wilson established Messrs John Wilson and Company in 1870 with his brothers James and John. The establishment coincided with Julius Vogel's public works policy that created a large demand for lime. The business opened an office on Queen Street, Auckland and a store on Customs Street.

James Alexander Pond sent Wilson The Science and Art of Portland Cement Manufacture and Wilson began experimenting with cement production. In 1884 Wilson produced Portland cement at his cement works in Warkworth. Wilson was the first to produce Portland cement at a commercial level in the Southern Hemisphere, producing 1,524 tonnes in 1887. Cement was not a popular building product at the time in New Zealand (brick was preferred), although the Rangitoto Beacon was constructed with Wilson's concrete. Wilson built show homes in Ponsonby and Grey Lynn but this venture nearly bankrupted the company. The company recovered and in 1899 won the contract to provide cement for the Wellington harbour reclamation and the Waikino Battery. That same year it won a gold medal at the Auckland Industrial and Mining Exhibition. In 1903 the company became publicly traded and four years later the name was changed to Wilson's Portland Cement Company. Wilson retired from the company in 1908. The company continued to grow after Wilson's retirement with projects including the Grafton Bridge and Queen's Wharf, Auckland. In 1918 the company merged with the Portland Cement Company and the Dominion Portland Cement Company. The name was retained but the cement works moved to Portland. This company had a monopoly on cement in the North Auckland area.

== Political career ==
Wilson was a member of the Rodney County Council for 12 years, 8 of those as chairman, being elected in 1877. Wilson served as chairman of the Upper Mahurangi Road Board and the Warkworth Town Board from 1909 to 1914.

In the 1884 general election Wilson ran for parliament in the Rodney electorate but came second place.

== Riverina ==
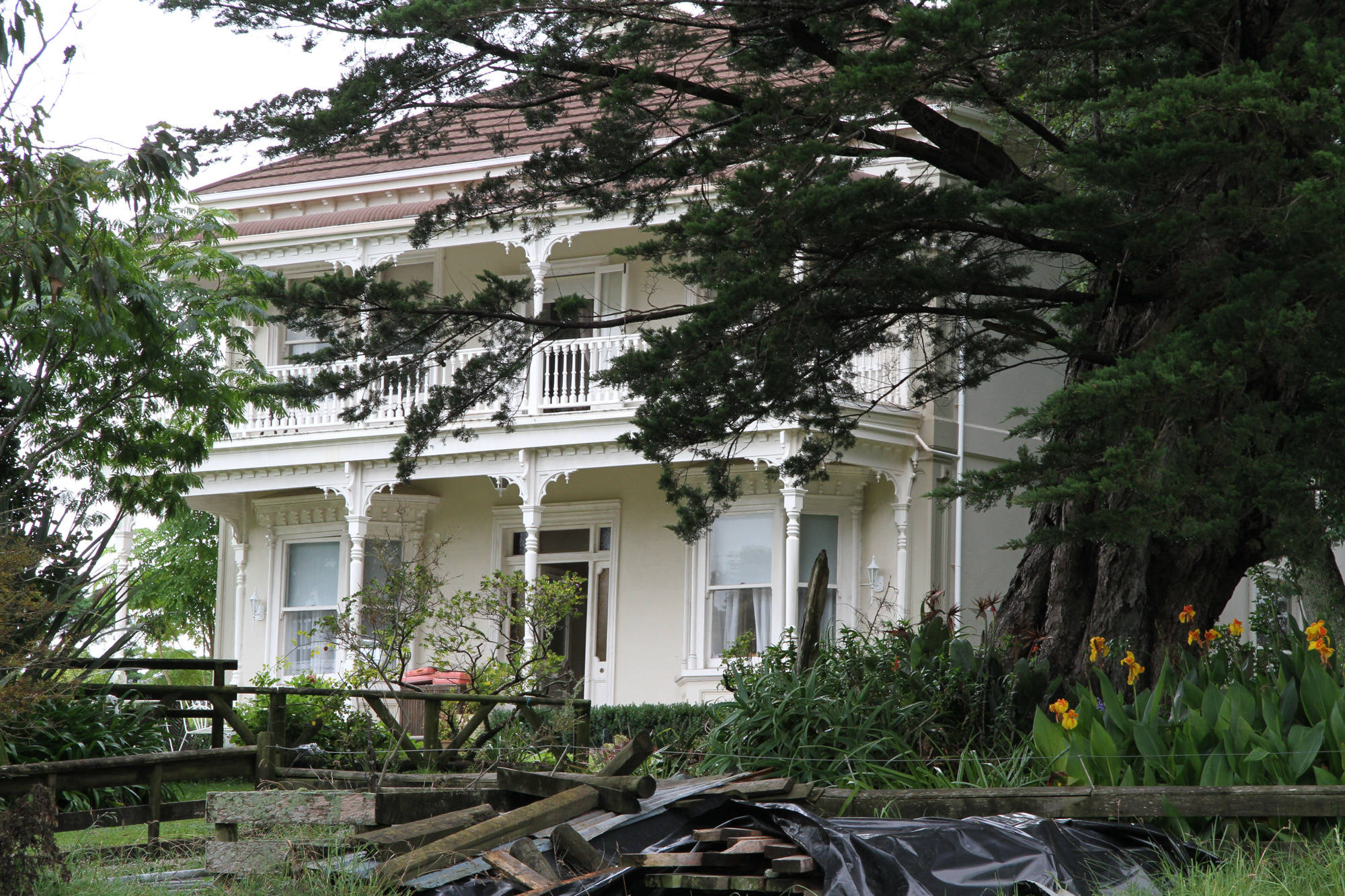
Riverina in 2011

In 1901 Riverina was constructed for Wilson as a retirement home. It was a large concrete building designed by Robert Wladislas de Montalk. It is registered as a category 2 building with Heritage New Zealand.

== Personal life ==
In 1863 Wilson married Florence Snell, and they had a family of five sons and five daughters. Four of the sons went into the cement business.

Wilson died on 23 September 1919.

== Legacy ==
Wilson's role in developing the cement industry in New Zealand and the town of Warkworth have led to him being referred to as the 'father' of the town and cement.
