= Conical Hill (disambiguation) =

A conical hill is a landform with a distinctly conical shape.

Conical hill or Conical peak may also refer to:

- Cone Hill, a hill on Hut Point Peninsula, in Ross Island, Antarctica.
- Cone Peak, the second highest mountain in the Santa Lucia Range in California, United States
- Conical Hill, Antarctica is a rock hill on the southern slopes of Mount Terror on Ross Island, Antarctica.
- Conical Hill, Sri Lanka, a mountain in the Nuwara Eliya District of Sri Lanka.
- Conical Hill, a hill on the Tapanui Branch railway line in New Zealand.
- Conical Peak, Montana, a mountain in Park County. See List of mountains in Park County, Montana
- Conical Peak, New Zealand, the highest mountain in the Horse Range (New Zealand)
- Conical Peak, Philippines, the highest point of Masbate Island
