= Adrian Rurawhe =

New Zealand politician (1961–2026)

The Right Honourable Adrian Rurawhe
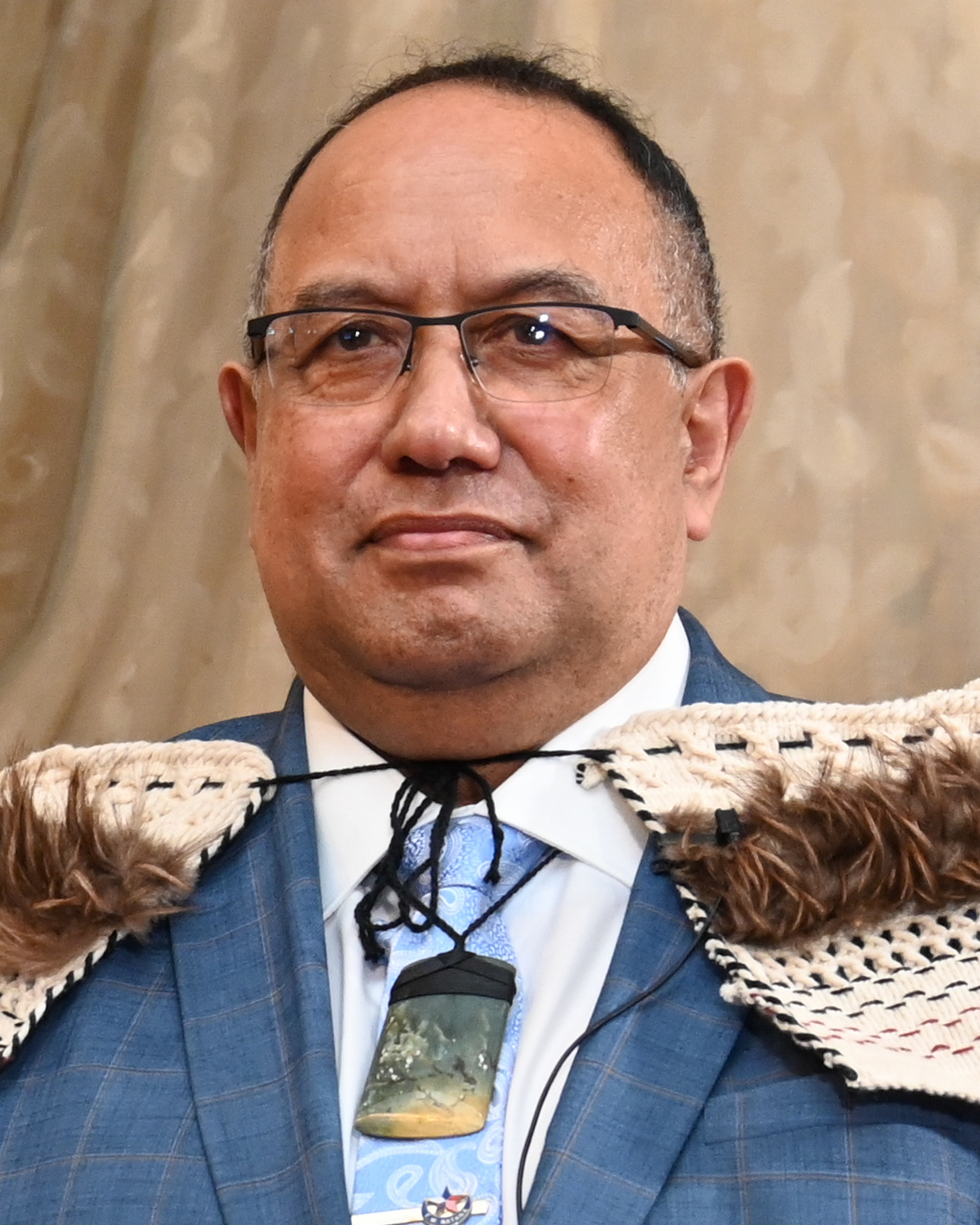
- Rurawhe in 2022

31st Speaker of the New Zealand House of Representatives
- In office 24 August 2022 – 5 December 2023
- Monarchs: Elizabeth II; Charles III
- Governor-General: Cindy Kiro
- Prime Minister: Jacinda Ardern; Chris Hipkins; Christopher Luxon
- Deputy: Greg O'Connor
- Preceded by: Trevor Mallard
- Succeeded by: Gerry Brownlee

Deputy Speaker of the House of Representatives
- In office 26 November 2020 – 24 August 2022
- Speaker: Trevor Mallard
- Preceded by: Anne Tolley
- Succeeded by: Greg O'Connor

Second Assistant Speaker of the House of Representatives
- In office 8 November 2017 – 26 November 2020
- Speaker: Trevor Mallard
- Preceded by: Trevor Mallard
- Succeeded by: Jacqui Dean

Member of the New Zealand Parliament for Labour Party list
- In office 14 October 2023 – 6 February 2026
- Succeeded by: Georgie Dansey (Note: Normally, list MPs do not have individual predecessors or successors, but Rurawhe resigned during a sitting parliament and therefore was succeeded by Dansey.)

Member of the New Zealand Parliament for Te Tai Hauāuru
- In office 20 September 2014 – 14 October 2023
- Preceded by: Tariana Turia
- Succeeded by: Debbie Ngarewa-Packer
- Majority: 1,053

Personal details
- Born: 1961 Taihape, New Zealand
- Died: 30 September 2026 (aged 65) Rātana Pā, New Zealand
- Relations: Matiu Rātana (grandfather); Iriaka Rātana (grandmother); T. W. Ratana (great-grandfather); Matt Ratana (cousin); Soraya Peke-Mason (cousin)

Adrian Paki Rurawhe (1961 – 30 September 2026) was a New Zealand Labour Party politician. He was an MP from 2014 to 2026, and the speaker of the New Zealand House of Representatives from 2022 to 2023.

Rurawhe held the seat for the Te Tai Hauāuru Māori electorate from 2014 to 2023. Citing the demands of being speaker, he did not contest the electorate in the 2023 election, but returned to Parliament at number 11 on Labour's party list.

== Background and professional career ==
Rurawhe was born in Taihape in 1961. His parents were Wereta and Mihi Rurawhe, and his paternal grandparents were Paki and Meipara Rurawhe. His maternal grandparents were Matiu and Iriaka Rātana, who were both Members of Parliament for the Western Maori electorate between 1945 and 1969. He was a great-grandson of Rātana founder T. W. Ratana. His grandfather died before he was born, and he was at secondary school before he was aware that his "Nan" had been a Member of Parliament.

He had a background in health and education. He was the chairman of the Ngāti Apa Māori iwi (tribe) for ten years and was on the team that negotiated the 2011 treaty settlement with the Crown through the Waitangi Tribunal. Koro Wētere, the former Eastern Maori MP, encouraged his early involvement in politics and was a mentor for Rurawhe.

== Political career ==
New Zealand Parliament
Years	Term	Electorate	List	Party
2014–2017	51st	Te Tai Hauāuru	none	Labour
2017–2020	52nd	Te Tai Hauāuru	none	Labour
2020–2023	53rd	Te Tai Hauāuru	24	Labour
2023–2026	54th	List	11	Labour

Rurawhe worked alongside Tariana Turia, to whom he was related, when she was still a member of the Labour Party. He was a member of the Māori Party between 2004 and 2008.

=== First term, 2014–2017 ===
At the 2014 election, after Turia had retired from politics, Rurawhe contested the Te Tai Hauāuru electorate for Labour and defeated Chris McKenzie of the Māori Party.

In his first term of Parliament, Labour was in Opposition and Rurawhe was appointed the Labour Party spokesperson for civil defence and emergency management (2014–2015), internal affairs (2015–2017) and Treaty of Waitangi negotiations (2017). He was also briefly junior whip after the election of Jacinda Ardern as Labour Party leader in 2017.

In July 2015, Rurawhe introduced the Official Information (Parliamentary Under-Secretaries) Amendment Bill. Under the provisions of the bill, information held by parliamentary under-secretaries would be classified as official information and consequently subject to Official Information Act requests. The bill was passed into law with the support of all parties except New Zealand First and received royal assent in July 2016.

=== Second term, 2017–2020 ===
Rurawhe retained Te Tai Hauāuru for Labour in the 2017 general election. Following the formation of the Sixth Labour Government in October 2017, Rurawhe was elected to the office of assistant speaker. National Party MP Simon Bridges challenged Rurawhe's election to the Chair on grounds that Rurawhe's name was still on the door of the whip's office. Party whips are not eligible to be a presiding officer. Speaker Trevor Mallard ruled that a name on a door in Parliament is not binding on the House and that the speaker's office had already been notified in writing that Rurawhe was not a whip, so the election could proceed.

=== Third term, 2020–2023 ===
Rurawhe won re-election in the 2020 general election, defeating the Māori Party's candidate, Debbie Ngarewa-Packer. When the official results were released, Rurawhe had a majority of 1,035, but after the Māori Party requested a recount in Te Tai Hauāuru, Rurawhe's majority increased slightly to 1,053. Following the election, Rurawhe was nominated as deputy speaker in the new Parliament, and was formally appointed to the role on 26 November.

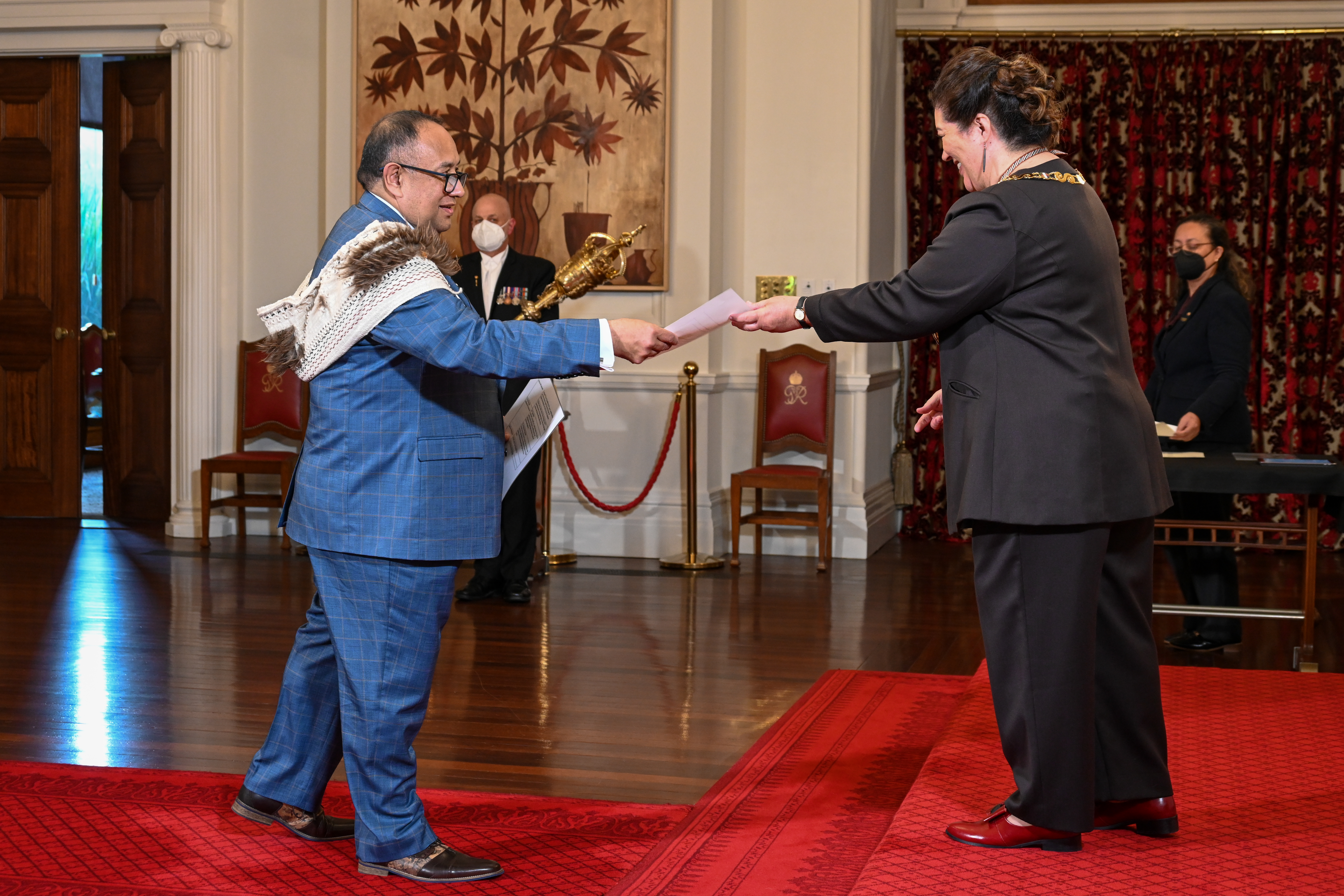
Rurawhe receives a letter from the governor-general, Dame Cindy Kiro, confirming his appointment as speaker of the House of Representatives, at Government House, Wellington, on 24 August 2022

As part of a cabinet reshuffle on 13 June 2022, Prime Minister Jacinda Ardern designated Rurawhe to replace Trevor Mallard as the next speaker of the House. It was announced that Mallard would resign in mid-August 2022 to assume a diplomatic position in Europe. On 24 August Rurawhe was elected as speaker of the House with the support of both the governing and opposition parties, becoming the second Māori to hold the position, after Peter Tapsell. As speaker, Rurawhe promised to award opposition parties more opportunities to question Government ministers if the governing Labour Party did not shorten some of its answers to its parliamentary debate questions.

=== Fourth term, 2023–2026 ===
Rurawhe did not contest the Te Tai Hauāuru electorate in the 2023 general election, but stood as a list-only candidate, as all previous incumbent speakers under MMP have done. He said that he felt the demands of being speaker meant that he could not serve the electorate fully. He was placed 11 on the Labour party list. During the 2023 general election, Rurawhe was re-elected on the party list.

Following the formation of the National-led coalition government in late November 2023, Rurawhe became spokesperson for Whānau Ora and Associate Māori Development in the Shadow Cabinet of Chris Hipkins. Following a shadow cabinet reshuffle in early March 2025, Rurawhe retained his Whānau Ora portfolio but lost his Māori Development portfolio.

On 21 January 2026, Rurawhe announced he would retire from Parliament prior to the 2026 New Zealand general election, retiring on Waitangi Day, with his position in Parliament being taken by Georgie Dansey, next on the Labour Party list.

== Political views ==
Rurawhe voted against the End of Life Choice Act 2019 and against the Abortion Legislation Act 2020.

In February 2026, Rurawhe criticised the contemporary leadership of Te Pāti Māori, comparing them unfavourably to the party's previous leaders Tariana Turia, Pita Sharples and Te Ururoa Flavell. Despite supporting the establishment of the Māori Health Authority, he attributed its dissolution to the previous Labour Government's failure to convince the broader electorate that it was needed.

== Death ==
Rurawhe died in Rātana Pā on 30 September 2026, at the age of 65.

== Notes ==
New Zealand Parliament
Preceded by Tariana Turia	Member of Parliament for Te Tai Hauāuru; 2014–2023	Succeeded by Debbie Ngarewa-Packer
Preceded by Trevor Mallard	Speaker of the House of Representatives; 2022–2023	Succeeded by Gerry Brownlee
