= Iriaka Rātana =

New Zealand politician

Iriaka Rātana OBE
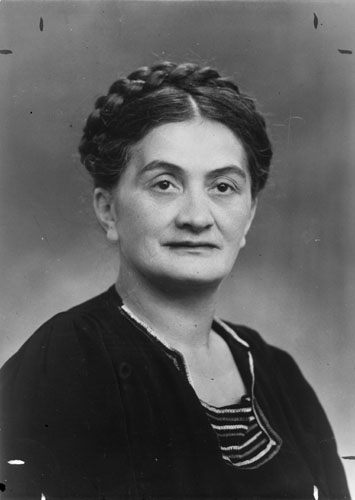
- Rātana in c. 1949

Member of the New Zealand Parliament for Western Maori
- In office 1949–1969
- Preceded by: Matiu Rātana
- Succeeded by: Koro Wētere

Personal details
- Born: Iriaka Te Rio; 25 February 1905 Hiruharama, New Zealand
- Died: 21 December 1981 (aged 76) Wanganui, New Zealand
- Party: Labour
- Spouse: Matiu Rātana
- Relatives: Adrian Rurawhe (grandson); Matt Rātana (grandson)

Iriaka Matiu Rātana OBE (née Te Rio; 25 February 1905 – 21 December 1981) was a New Zealand politician and Rātana morehu who won the Western Maori electorate for Labour in 1949. She succeeded her recently deceased husband Matiu Rātana to become the first woman to represent Māori in the New Zealand Parliament. She held the electorate until her retirement in 1969.

== Early life ==
An entertainer from an early age, she was a member of the Rātana kapa haka groups and travelled with them throughout New Zealand and overseas. In 1925, she married Tahupōtiki Wiremu Rātana to become his second wife and had two children. Hamuera, the oldest died from tuberculosis in 1934, and the second, Raniera Te Aohou Ratana later became head of the Rātana church.

Following her husband's death in 1939, Rātana married Matiu Rātana, a son of T. W. Rātana. The couple farmed until the death in 1945 of Matiu's elder brother, Toko Rātana who was Member of Parliament (MP) for the Māori electorate of Western Maori. Matiu Rātana was elected in the 1945 election and held the seat until his accidental death in 1949.

== Political career ==
New Zealand Parliament
Years	Term	Electorate	Party
1949–1951	29th	Western Maori	Labour
1951–1954	30th	Western Maori	Labour
1954–1957	31st	Western Maori	Labour
1957–1960	32nd	Western Maori	Labour
1960–1963	33rd	Western Maori	Labour
1963–1966	34th	Western Maori	Labour
1966–1969	35th	Western Maori	Labour

Iriaka Rātana's decision to stand for parliament was opposed by those supporting traditional leadership roles, with Te Puea Hērangi speaking out against her claim to "captain the Tainui canoe". Only the strong backing of the Rātana church and her threat to stand as a Rātana Independent secured her the Labour Party nomination.

She won the Western Maori electorate for Labour in the 1949 general election. She succeeded her husband Matiu Ratana to become the first woman to represent Māori in the New Zealand parliament. She got a similar majority (6317) to her husband in 1946 (his majority was 6491), but no fewer than seven independent candidates stood against her; they got 116 to 326 votes each.

In 1953, Rātana was awarded the Queen Elizabeth II Coronation Medal.

In May 1959 she was injured in a three-car accident near Sanson in which three people were killed. Among those killed were her farm manager, Charles Larkin, and Larkin's adopted seven-year-old son, Rangi. Rātana and the others injured in the crash were taken to Palmerston North Hospital. One of the others injured was Pat Curran, a Labour member of the Auckland City Council. She was initially on the seriously ill list, but stabilised.

As an MP, Rātana was concerned with welfare issues for Māori. She worked hard to improve living standards, particularly at the church settlement of Rātana Pā. She held the electorate until her retirement in 1969.

Rātana was appointed an Officer of the Order of the British Empire, for services to the Māori people, in the 1971 New Year Honours. She died on 21 December 1981 in Wanganui Hospital and was buried at Aramoho Cemetery.

New Zealand Parliament
Preceded by Matiu Rātana	Member of Parliament for Western Maori; 1949–1969	Succeeded by Koro Wētere
