= 1945 Western Maori by-election =

New Zealand by-election

- 10 February 1945
- Turnout: 9,335
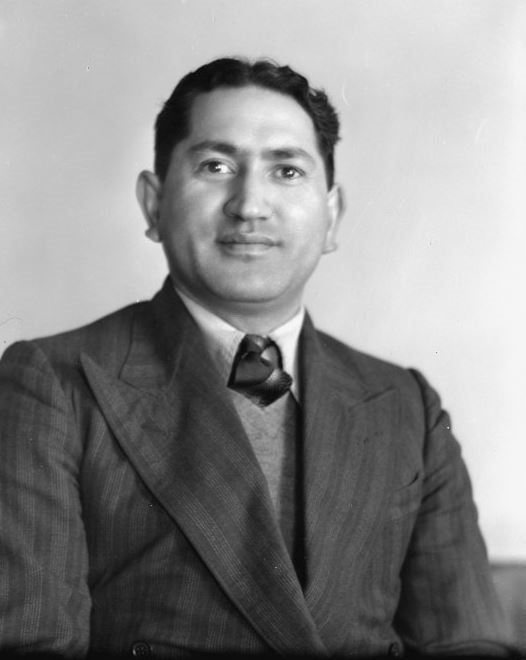

Candidate	Matiu Ratana	Pei te Hurinui Jones
Party	Labour	National
Popular vote	4,697	2,908
Percentage	53.63	33.20
Member before election
Toko Ratana
Labour
Elected Member
Matiu Ratana
Labour

The Western Maori by-election 1945 was a by-election held in the Western Maori electorate during the 28th New Zealand Parliament, on 10 February 1945.

== Background ==
The by-election was caused by the death of incumbent MP Toko Ratana on 30 October 1944. He had been the MP since 1935.

The by-election was won by his younger brother Matiu Ratana who also succeeded him as head of the Ratana Church. They were sons of the church founder T W Ratana. Ratana had an electoral alliance with Labour.

The challenger Pei te Hurinui Jones was supported by National and Kingitanga, the Maori King Movement.

Kaponga Erueti who had initially announced his intention to contest the election as an Independent Labour candidate later decided to withdraw from the contest, his withdrawal came late enough that his name still appeared on the ballot paper.

The other six challengers all lost their deposits, although one motorist complainant was aggrieved that all the candidates got a petrol allocation of 250 gallons when the usual personal allocation was ten or fifteen gallons!

== Results ==
The following table gives the election results (the results included some "servicemens votes" from overseas):

1945 Western Maori by-election
Party	Candidate	Votes	%	±%
Labour	Matiu Ratana	4,697	53.63	
National	Pei Te Hurinui Jones	2,908	33.20	
Independent	Winiata Piahana	452	5.16	
Independent	Takumaru Roetana Tupaea	371	4.24	
Independent	Rehe Parene Rewi Maniapoto Amohanga	111	1.27	
Independent	Pepiriri Reweti	108	1.23	
Independent Labour	Kaponga Erueti	93	1.06	
Independent	Reha Kau Hou	41	0.47	
Majority		1,789	19.16	
Informal votes		554		
Turnout		9,335		
