= Maata "Te Reo" Hura =

Maata "Te Reo" Hura (also known as Maata Tawhirimatea) (16 January 1904 – 25 September 1991) was the fifth President of the Ratana Church of New Zealand.

One of seven children of the founder of the church Tahupotiki Wiremu Ratana and his wife Te Urumanao Ngapaki, she was born in the family homestead, later to become part of the church settlement, and was with her parents in 1918 when her father started having the visions that would later cause him to found the church.

She accompanied her father on his missions around the country and overseas, and in 1925 was married whilst in Japan to Huia Whenuaroa, another member of the Ratana concert group. She later remarried twice, having two children from her second marriage, and six from her third.

In 1966, following the death of her aunt Puhi o Aotea Ratahi, Hura succeeded her as head of the church. She succeeded in building a good relationship with Te Atairangikaahu, the then Maori Queen, and raising funds to repair many of the church buildings. Hura continued to take an active role in the church right up to her death in 1991, survived by seven of her children.

On Monday 15 August 1983, a handful of followers and herself sanctioned the Ratana Church of Australia. As of 2008, there has been a reported membership of 20,000 Ratana faithful residing in various parts of Australia.
