= Harerangi Meihana =

New Zealand clergyman (1934–2022)

- 7th Tumuaki of the Rātana Church
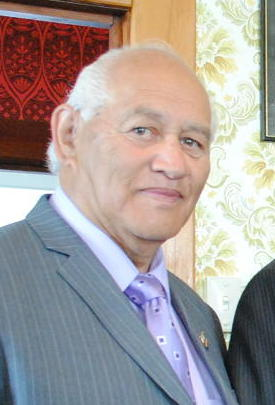
- Meihana in 2012
- Church: Rātana Church
- Installed: 5 April 1999
- Term ended: 11 May 2022
- Predecessor: Rāniera Rātana
- Successor: Manuao Te Kohamutunga Tamou

Personal details
- Born: Rehimana Harerangi Meihana; 31 March 1934 New Zealand
- Died: 11 May 2022 (aged 88) Rātana Pā, New Zealand
- Other name: Harry Lang Mason

Rehimana Harerangi Meihana (31 March 1934 – 11 May 2022), also known as Harry Lang Mason, was the seventh tumuaki or president of the Rātana Established Church of New Zealand. His mother was Rāwinia Rātana, a daughter of the founder of the faith, Tahupōtiki Wiremu Rātana. He served as tumuaki from his election on 5 April 1999 until his death on 11 May 2022, at Rātana Pā, aged 88 years. He was succeeded as tumuaki by Manuao Te Kohamutunga Tamou.
