= 1930 Western Maori by-election =

New Zealand by-election

- 8 October 1930
- Turnout: 7,358
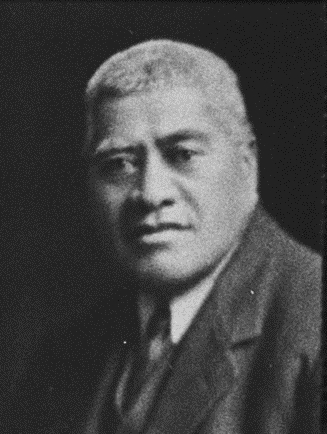

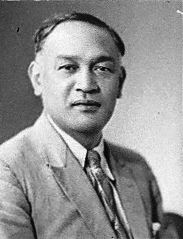
Candidate	Taite Te Tomo	Toko Ratana
Party	Reform	Ratana
Popular vote	3,921	3,101
Percentage	53.29	42.14
Member before election
Sir Maui Pomare
Reform
Elected Member
Taite Te Tomo
Reform

The 1930 Western Maori by-election was a by-election during the 23rd New Zealand Parliament. The election was held on 8 October 1930. It was held on the same day as another by-election in Waipawa.

The seat of Western Maori became vacant following the death of the sitting member Sir Maui Pomare on 27 June. The by-election was won by Taite Te Tomo.

== Candidates ==
Both Pomare and Te Tomo were members of the Reform Party, then in opposition. Haanui Tokauru Ratana is described as Independent or Ratana. Pei Te Hurinui Jones is described as Independent or Young Maori Party. He later supported National.

== Results ==
The following table gives the election results:

1930 Western Maori by-election
Party	Candidate	Votes	%	±%
Reform	Taite Te Tomo	3,921	53.29	
Ratana	Toko Ratana	3,101	42.14	
Independent	Pei Te Hurinui Jones	336	4.57	
Majority		820	11.14	
Turnout		7,358		
