= Pepene Eketone =

New Zealand politician (1856–1933)

Pepene Eketone (ca. 1856 – 9 November 1933) was a New Zealand interpreter, native agent, assessor and politician. Of Māori descent, he identified with the Ngāti Maniapoto iwi. He was born in Taranaki, New Zealand in circa 1856.

He sometimes used an English name, which was based on missionaries, and was thus known as Fairburn Eggleston or Fairburn Eccleston. The official return for the 1931 election lists him as Pepene Tango Eketone; the middle name is not mentioned in his Dictionary of New Zealand Biography.

Eketone was politically active and contested his first general election in 1887, when he stood in the Western Maori electorate; he came third out of five candidates. In the 1890 election, he came second after the incumbent, Hoani Taipua. In the 1896 election, he was one of 13 candidates in the Western Maori electorate and came seventh.

He had one last (unsuccessful) attempt of getting elected in the Western Maori electorate in the 1931 general election; of the six candidates, he came fourth.
