= Puhi o Aotea Ratahi =

Puhi o Aotea Ratahi (1898 or 1899 – 1966) was the fourth president of the Rātana Established Church of New Zealand and younger sister of the church's founder T. W. Ratana, the Mangai. She succeeded her nephew Matiu Ratana, the son of the Mangai in 1950 and served as president of the church till her sudden death in 1966.
