= Christian Maramatanga Society =

The Christian Maramatanga Society is a small Christian-based denomination originating in New Zealand in mid-1920s.

== History ==
Following a theological debate in the Rātana Established Church of New Zealand, Ngapiki Hakaraia left the church to form her own movement at Kai Iwi, a settlement in New Zealand to the west of Wanganui. It is said that when Tahupotiki Wiremu Rātana, Mangai, founder of the Rātana Established Church of New Zealand (commonly known as Rātana Church) "closed the Bible", many thought that he implied that the members of the church should not read the Bible as well. This influenced Mrs. Hakaraia into forming her own church to ensure that the Bible "remained open". However, Rātana did not imply this but rather that the Bible be closed in order to stop fanciful prophecies being heralded from the Book of Revelation in the future.

Following the Rātana church, the Society actively engaged in politics.

== Today ==
The church continues today with a small membership.
