= Taite Te Tomo =

Māori politician (died 1939)

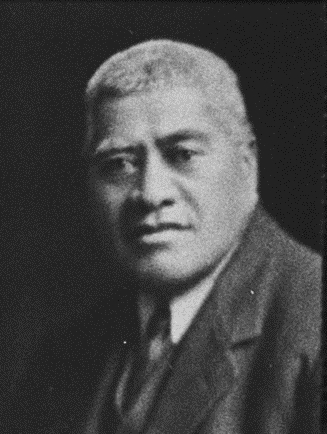
Taite Te Tomo in circa 1930

New Zealand Parliament
| Years | Term | Electorate | Party |
|---|---|---|---|
| 1930–1931 | 23rd | Western Maori | Reform |
| 1931–1935 | 24th | Western Maori | Reform |

Taite Te Tomo (1871 or 1872 – 22 May 1939) was a Māori and Reform Party Member of Parliament in New Zealand.

Te Tomo was probably born in 1871 or 1872 near Ōtaki.

He won the Western Maori electorate in a 1930 by-election after the death of Māui Pōmare, but lost it in 1935 to the Ratana candidate Toko Ratana.

In 1935, he was awarded the King George V Silver Jubilee Medal.

He was a member of the Ngāti Tūwharetoa tribe, and of the Board of Ethnological Research. He died at Kākāriki Pā on 22 May 1939.

New Zealand Parliament
| Preceded by Māui Pōmare | Member of Parliament for Western Maori; 1930–1935 | Succeeded by Toko Ratana |
