= 1886 Western Maori by-election =

New Zealand by-election

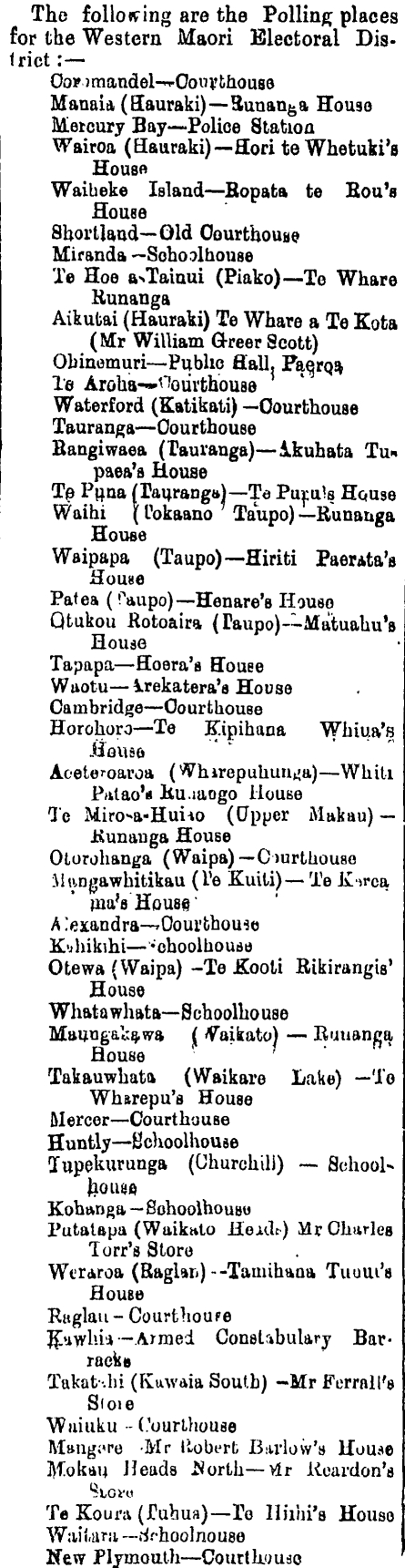
Polling places for the 1886 Western Maori by-election

The 1886 Western Maori by-election was a by-election held in the Western Maori electorate during the 9th New Zealand Parliament, on 23 December 1886. The by-election was caused by the death of the incumbent, Te Puke Te Ao, and was won by Hoani Taipua.

== Background ==
Te Ao had won the Western Maori electorate in the 1884 election; it had been the first time that he had stood in a general election. Te Ao died in October 1886. This triggered the by-election, which was held on 23 December 1886.

== The election ==
The nomination meeting was held on 2 December 1868 at the court house in Wanganui, with George Thomas Wilkinson presiding as the returning officer. The candidates were nominated in the following order: Hoani Taipua, Ngawaka Taurua, Henare Kaihau of Waiuku, Wiremu Te Wheoro, and Sydney Taiwhanga. The show of hands was strongly in favour of Hoani Taipua, and Te Wheoro demanded a poll, for which 23 December was set.

The by-election was a decisive win for Hoani Taipua, who gained an absolute majority of the votes, and had a 33% lead over the second-placed candidate, Wiremu Te Wheoro. Te Wheoro had previously represented the electorate, from 1879 until his defeat in the 1884 election. Taipua went on to represent the electorate until his retirement at the 1893 election.

== Election results ==
=== 1884 election ===
The 1884 general election was contested by eight candidates in the Western Maori electorate.

=== 1886 by-election ===
1886 Western Maori by-election
Party	Candidate	Votes	%	±%
Independent	Hoani Taipua	1,258	56.67	
Independent	Wiremu Te Wheoro	519	23.38	+12.40
Independent	Henare Kaihau	225	10.14	+0.43
Independent	Sydney Taiwhanga	148	6.67	+1.14
Independent	Ngawaka Taurua	70	3.15	
Majority		739	33.29	+28.19
Turnout		2,220		
