= John Ormsby =

John Ormsby may refer to:

- John Ormsby (negotiator) (1854–1927), negotiator for the Ngāti Maniapoto iwi (tribe)
- John Ormsby (settler) (1720–1805), American soldier from Ireland and early Pittsburgh-area settler
- John Ormsby (translator) (1829–1895), nineteenth-century British translator
- John William Ormsby (1881–1952), English recipient of the Victoria Cross
