= Pita Moko =

New Zealand land agent (1885–1943)

Pita Te Turuki Tamati Moko (9 May 1885 – 8 June 1943) was a New Zealand land agent, and as an early adherent of T. W. Ratana's Rātana movement, Moko served as a secretary or executive officer for T. W., being later described as his "mouthpiece".

Moko was born in Rotorua, New Zealand on 9 May 1885. Of Māori descent, he was of the Ngati Whakaue and Te Arawa tribes.

He stood in Eastern Maori in the 1928 and 1931 general elections, coming second to Āpirana Ngata.
