= Waata (given name) =

Waata is a given name. Notable people with the name include:

- Waata Pihikete Kukutai (died 1867), New Zealand Māori tribal leader
- Waata Roore Erueti (1868–1952), Tainui historian
- Colleen Waata Urlich (1939–2015), New Zealand ceramicist
