= Wiremu Te Wheoro =

Wiremu Te Wheoro MP
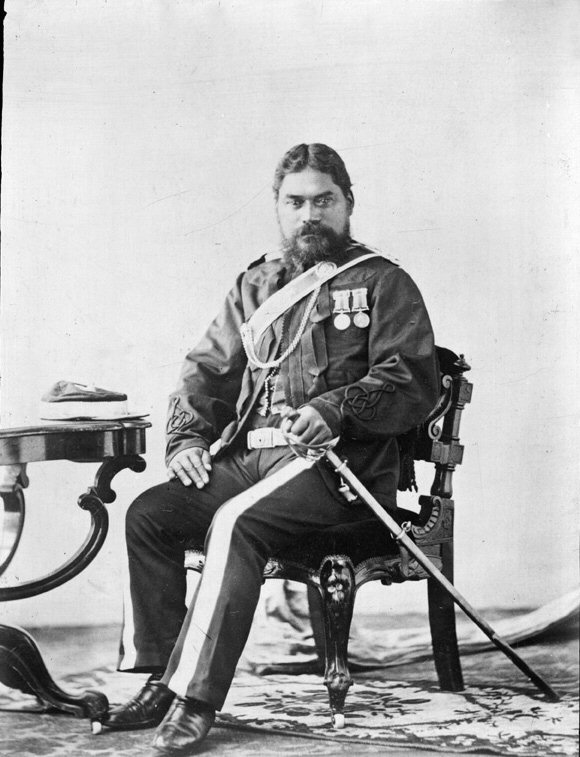

Personal details
- Born: 1826 Waikato, New Zealand
- Died: 1895 (aged 68–69) New Zealand
- Occupation: Politician

Wiremu Te Morehu Maipapa Te Wheoro (1826–1895), also known as Major Te Wheoro and later as Wiremu Te Morehu or William Morris, was a 19th-century Māori member of the House of Representatives.

Te Wheoro was born in the Waikato. His father was Te Kanawa, a chief of the Ngāti Mahuta and Ngāti Naho iwi. He was a strong supporter of Pakeha economic concepts and institutions; at a great meeting at Paetai, near Rangiriri, in May 1857, he spoke against a proposal to install Te Wherowhero of Ngati Mahuta as Maori King arguing that the title of "King" appeared to place Te Wherowhero above the Governor. In 1862 he was appointed the chief assessor, who acted as local magistrate and chief of police, in charge of the official runanga at Te Kohekohe, south of Meremere. He asked that a wooden courthouse be built there for magistrate John Gorst, and suggested that Maori youths be drilled to keep order. Timbers for the courthouse were thrown into the river in March 1863 as tensions between Kingites and the government grew. Lieutenant General Duncan Cameron appointed him a captain in the colonial militia and Te Wheoro joined Waata Kukutai in ferrying supplies from steamers at the Waikato Heads to the Camerontown redoubt, until the supply line was severed by a Ngati Maniapoto attack in September 1863.

From late 1863 Te Wheoro began to act as intermediary between the Government and the King movement and in 1865 became an assessor in the Native Land Court. In 1873 he was appointed major in the colonial forces and two years later was appointed a native commissioner, continuing to assist in negotiations between the King movement and the Government.

Te Wheoro resigned as a native commissioner in 1879, disenchanted with his role and believing his people were treated unfairly. On 8 September 1879 he was elected to Parliament as the representative for Western Maori, defeating Hoani Taipua after Hoani Nahe's retirement. In 1879 there were doubts about his election, and the Elections Validation Act, 1879 validated the election of Te Wheoro and two other MHRs, William Henry Colbeck and Honi Mohi Tawhai.

In the 1881 election, he had three challengers, but received 69 percent of the vote. In the 1884 election, he was one of eight candidates and came third.

New Zealand Parliament
Years	Term	Electorate	Party
1879–1881	7th	Western Maori	Independent
1881–1884	8th	Western Maori	Independent

He was defeated by Te Puke Te Ao, with Te Keepa Te Rangihiwinui in second place. In the 1886 by-election, he came second out of five candidates.

In the 1887 election, he came second out of five candidates.

== Notes ==
New Zealand Parliament
Preceded by Hoani Nahe	Member of Parliament for Western Maori; 1879–1884	Succeeded by Te Puke Te Ao
