= Wiremu Parata =

Māori chief and politician

The Honourable Wiremu Te Kākākura Parata
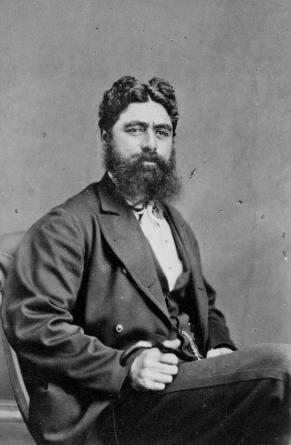
- Wiremu Parata circa 1876

Minister without portfolio
- In office Dec 1872 – Feb 1876
- Prime Minister: George Waterhouse; Sir William Fox; Sir Julius Vogel; Daniel Pollen

Member of the New Zealand Parliament for Western Maori
- In office 1871–1875
- Preceded by: Mete Kīngi Paetahi
- Succeeded by: Hoani Nahe

Personal details
- Born: c. 1830s Kapiti Island
- Died: 29 September 1906 Waikanae
- Resting place: Waikanae
- Party: None
- Relations: Huria Matenga (sister-in-law); Te Pēhi Kupe (great-uncle)
- Father: George Stubbs
- Mother: Metapere Waipunahau

Te Kākākura Waipunaahau (c. 1835 – 29 September 1906), more widely known as Wiremu Parata, was a New Zealand politician of Māori and Pākehā descent. During the 1870s, he was a member of the House of Representatives and a Minister of the Crown.

== Early years, and farming ==
Te Kākākura was the son of Metapere Waipunaahau, a Māori woman of high status, and George Stubbs, a whaler and trader from Australia. His grandfather Te Rangi Hīroa and his great-uncle Te Pēhi Kupe were leading rangatira amongst the Te Āti Awa and Ngāti Toa iwi who had settled along the Kāpiti Coast.

After Stubbs drowned in a boating accident off Kapiti Island in 1838, Te Kākākura and his brother were taken by their mother to the pā at Kenakena, where he was raised. It was about this time that a missionary gave him the name "Brother William" (transliterated to "Wiremu Parata" or the short form "Wi Parata").

In 1852, Parata married his second wife, Unaiki; little is known of his first marriage. Parata and Unaiki are thought to have had eleven children.

In the late 1860s, Parata became a farmer and owned about 1,600 sheep by the mid-1870s. By then, he was relatively wealthy and owned the largest farm in the area of Waikanae, a town initially named after him ("Parata Township"). He hosted the Waikanae Hack Racing Club on his land, a practice that his son and grandson subsequently maintained until 1914.

== Political career ==
New Zealand Parliament
| Years | Term | Electorate | Party |
|---|---|---|---|
| 1871–1875 | 5th | Western Maori | Independent |

Parata entered politics in the 1860s. In 1871, he was elected to the House of Representatives as the member for the Western Maori constituency, defeating the incumbent Mete Kīngi Paetahi. He remained the sitting member of parliament for the duration of the 5th New Zealand Parliament.

In December 1872, Parata became just the second Māori to be appointed to the Executive Council (thus becoming a Minister of the Crown) joining Wi Katene who had been appointed just a month earlier.

Parata is described by the Dictionary of New Zealand Biography as having been "an astute politician and skilled orator and debater". In Parliament, he expressed the view that Pākehā were not qualified to make informed decisions regarding Māori, and pressed for Māori and Pākehā MPs to work together on laws for the benefit of both peoples. He also called for the appointment of a commission to look into Māori grievances related to land confiscations.

In the 1876 election, he was one of three candidates in the Western Maori electorate and came last, beaten by Hoani Nahe and Te Keepa Te Rangihiwinui.

== Wi Parata v Bishop of Wellington (1877) ==
Parata is perhaps best remembered for the court case which bears his name. In 1877, he took Octavius Hadfield, the Bishop of Wellington, to the Supreme Court, over a breach of oral contract between the Anglican Church and the Ngāti Toa, and a breach of the principles of the Treaty of Waitangi. The Ngāti Toa had provided land to the church in 1848 in exchange for a promise that a school for young Ngāti Toa people would be built by the church. No school was built, and, in 1850, the church obtained a Crown grant to the land, without the consent of the iwi. The case (Wi Parata v the Bishop of Wellington) was a failure for Parata; Chief Justice James Prendergast ruled that the Treaty of Waitangi was a "simply nullity", having been signed by "primitive barbarians". The ruling had far-reaching consequences, as it was invoked as precedent during subsequent claims brought for breaches of the Treaty, well into the twentieth century.

== Later life ==
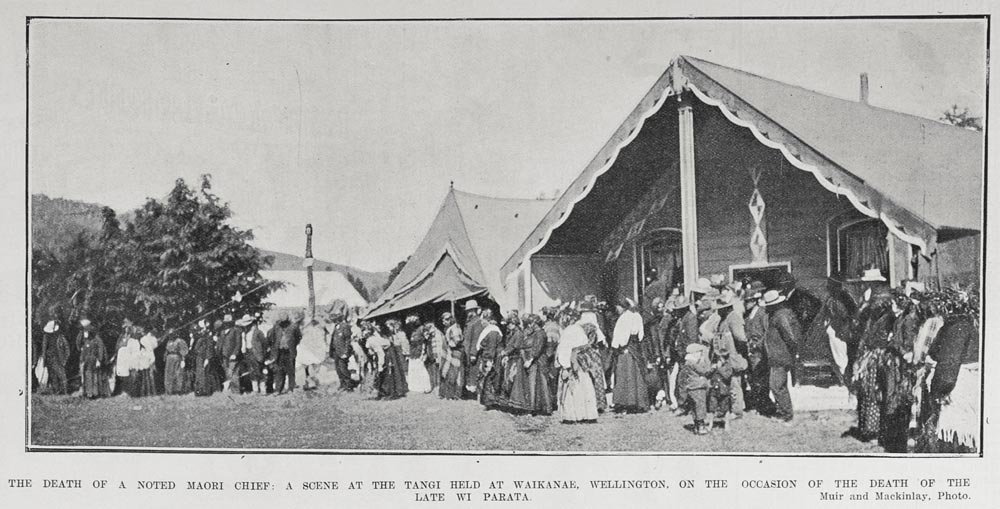
The tangi for Wi Parata

In the late 1870s, Parata openly supported pacifist leader Te Whiti-o-Rongomai, providing him and his Parihaka community with financial support.

In 1884, Parata granted the Wellington and Manawatu Railway Company the right to build their railway across 7 miles (11 km) of tribal land at Waikanae, but said that the owners would not subdivide their land for sale.

On 29 September 1906, Parata died at Waikanae from injuries sustained after falling from a horse.

== Notes ==
New Zealand Parliament
| Preceded by Mete Kīngi Paetahi | Member of Parliament for Western Maori; 1871–1875 | Succeeded by Hoani Nahe |
