= Lake Waipu =

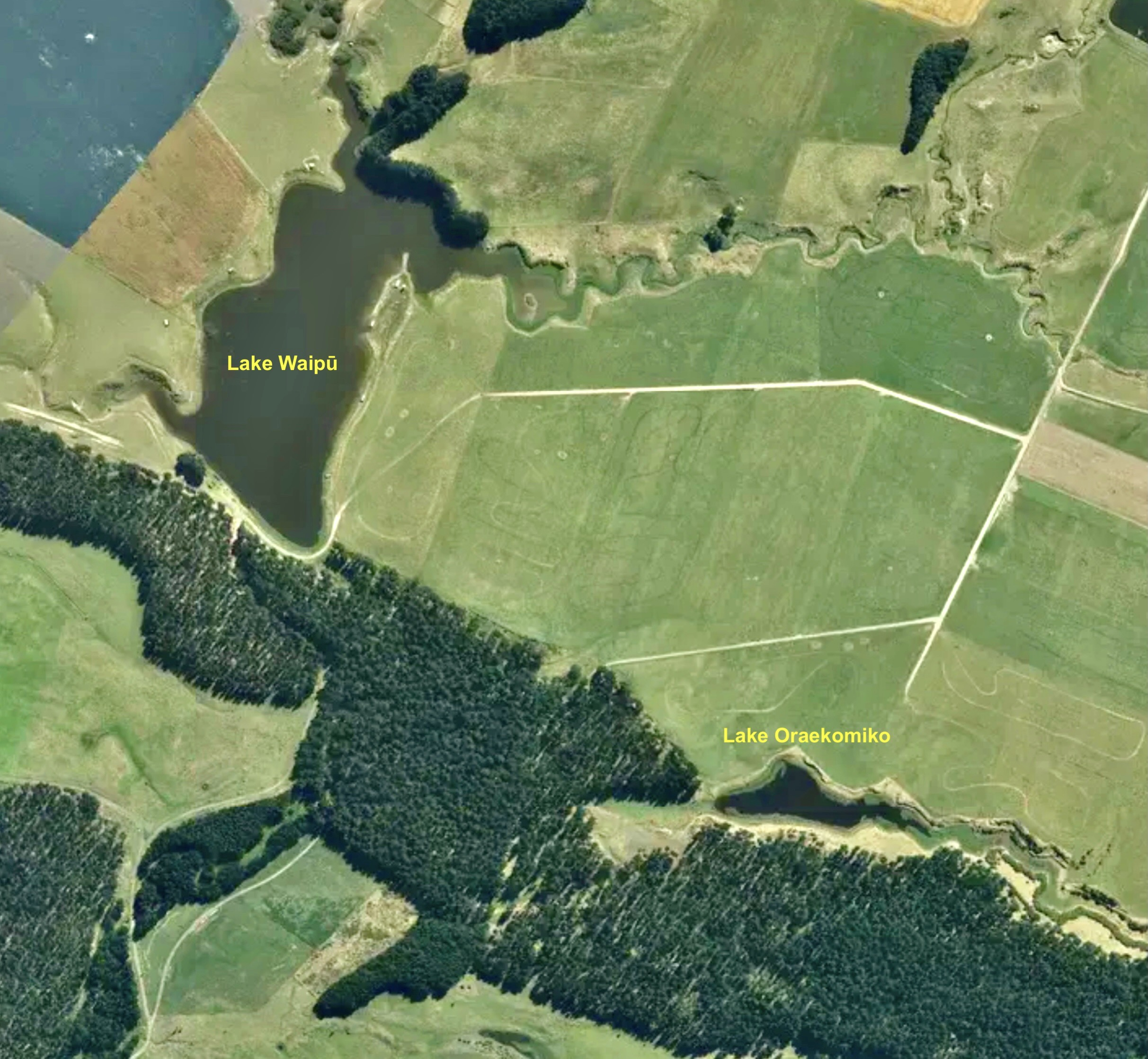
- Aerial view of Lakes Waipu and Oraekomiko 2021-22

- Location within North Island
- Interactive map of Lake Waipu
- Location: North Island
- Coordinates: 40.045°S 175.158°E
- Type: dune lake
- Catchment area: 527 ha (1,300 acres)
- Basin countries: New Zealand
- Max. length: 700 m (2,300 ft)
- Surface area: 7 hectares (17 acres) (open water)
- Max. depth: 4.7 metres (15 ft)
- Settlements: Rātana Pā

Lake Waipu, just south of Rātana Pā, is a 7 ha (17 acres) shallow coastal aeolian, or dune-dammed, lake. Horizons Regional Council has monitored water quality in the lake since 2015. The lake's catchment is mainly pasture and Rātana's treated sewage runs into a tributary of the lake, accounting for the trophic level index being eutrophic at 6.9. However, the submerged plant indicator of 34.3% is better and kākahi (native freshwater mussels) live in the lake.

A $1.75 million project with the Ministry for the Environment, Rangitīkei District Council, Ngā Wairiki Ngāti Apa, Rātana Community Board, and the Department of Conservation, will pipe the wastewater to land near Whangaehu beach. Planting and other improvements it is planned to improve the lake's pollution.

Lake Waipu usually drains through the sand, as does nearby Lake Oraekomiko, though in places, especially in wet weather, a stream runs 2.2 km (1.4 mi) to the Turakina River.
