= Ngapiki Hakaraia =

New Zealand religious founder

Ngapiki Hakaraia (4 May 1888 – 9 November 1969) was a New Zealand religious founder. Of Māori descent, she identified with the Ngā Rauru and Ngāti Apa iwi. She was born in Kai Iwi, Wanganui, New Zealand on 4 May 1888. She founded Te Māramatanga Christian Society.
