= Te Kanawa =

There are at least four different people called Te Kanawa.

== Te Kanawa of Ngāti Maniapoto ==
Another was a chief of the Ngāti Maniapoto, another Tainui iwi. Te Kanawa was a warlord of Maniapoto; he settled disputes with a taiaha within Tainui or outside Tainui. Some of these disputes were boundary disputes, hence the Ngāti Hari connection. The boundary line between Tūwharetoa and Maniapoto and the marae Hia Kaitupeka by Taumarunui. He is represented by an amo on their carved meeting house.

== Te Kanawa, ancestor of Ngāti Te Kanawa ==
One is the ancestor of the Ngāti Te Kanawa hapū of the Tainui confederation of iwi and is closely tied to Ngāti Tamainupō. He is referred to as Te Kanawa II, and is the grandson of the first Te Kanawa (Te Kanawa Pango) of Ngāti Maniapoto.

== Te Kanawa ==
He was killed in the campaign known as Putu-karekare or Patu-karekare, which was fought at Kawhia in the time before Te Rauparaha had left Kawhia around 1820.

== Te Kanawa of Ngāti Mahuta and Ngāti Naho ==
He was also known as Te Kanawa Ikatu of the Ngāti Mahuta and Ngāti Naho hapū, and was one of the principal chiefs of the Waikato Māori. He was a close confederate of Pōtatau Te Wherowhero, the first Māori King, and lived from c. 1770 to c. 1860. He was signatory to the treaty signing at Kawhia. His wife was Te Rahuruake (according to Pei Te Hurunui in his book King Potatau, p. 120) and their son was Kihirini Te Kanawa. Te Kanawa Ikatu had a sister, Parekohu. Whose great grandson was Wiremu Te Wheoro.

== Sources ==
- Whakapapa Forum Post
