= Ropata Te Ao =

New Zealand politician (died 1908)

New Zealand Parliament
| Years | Term | Electorate | Party |
|---|---|---|---|
| 1893–1896 | 12th | Western Maori | Independent |

Ropata Te Ao (died 23 April 1908) was a nineteenth-century Māori member of the House of Representatives.

His father was Te Aotuta-hanga and his mother was Te Raute. Te Ao was an elder of the Ngāti Raukawa tribe and lived in Ōtaki on the Kāpiti Coast.

He represented the Western Maori electorate from 1893 after the retirement of Hoani Taipua, to 1896 when he was defeated by Henare Kaihau. He was related to Te Puke Te Ao, who had represented the Western Maori electorate from 1884 until his death in 1886.

Te Ao died on 23 April 1908.

New Zealand Parliament
| Preceded by Hoani Taipua | Member of Parliament for Western Maori; 1893–1896 | Succeeded by Henare Kaihau |
