= Hoani Nahe =

Māori historian and author (c. 1833 – 1894)

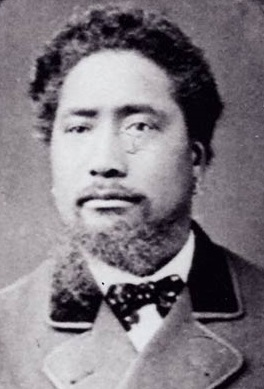
Hoani Nahe

Hoani Nahe (c. 1833 – 18 May 1894) was a Māori historian and author, and a member of the House of Representatives from 1876 to 1879. His surname was spelt Nahi in some reports.

== Early life and career ==
Nahe was born near Thames in 1833 or 1834. His father was Pātara Te Rangiteapake of Ngāti Maru and his mother was Riripeti or Rohu of Ngāti Whanaunga. Nahe's primary tribe was Ngāti Maru.

He was a student at St John's College, Auckland in 1852. His life work, which he began in the late 1850s, was recording Māori history and tradition, particularly of Tainui and Hauraki. The ethnographer John White published a translated and altered version of some of Nahe's manuscript work on history in volume 4 of his The Ancient History of the Maori. Nahe later complained to Percy Smith about White's faulty alterations.

He was involved in contemporary affairs affecting Māori. He acted in Native Land Court cases, both on his own behalf and for others. He was on a committee at Thames whose aim was to support the Māori newspaper Te Wananga, published in Hawke's Bay.

== Member of Parliament ==
New Zealand Parliament
Years	Term	Electorate	Party
1876–1879	6th	Western Maori	Independent

He was the MP for Western Maori from 1876, when he defeated the incumbent Wiremu Parata and fellow challenger Te Keepa Te Rangihiwinui. He was the third MP to hold the seat. He was a minister without portfolio, the only Māori minister, and on the Executive Council of the Grey Ministry (17 November 1877 – 8 October 1879). He faced difficulties in Parliament due to his lack of English. He retired after one term at the 1879 election.

== Later career ==
Nahe continued with the recording of Māori history and tradition. He was made a corresponding member of the Polynesian Society in 1893, a year after it formed. In 1893 and 1894 he wrote a new and expanded version of his account of Māori history. In 1894 Nahe went to Paeroa to assist in a land dispute between two tribal groups. He contracted a cold following long discussions outdoors, then a lung inflammation, and died at the home of his cousin Wīrope Hōterini Taipari near Thames on 18 May 1894.

Percy Smith, editor of the Journal of the Polynesian Society, published some of Nahe's work posthumously. This included his work on Māori history and on the etymology of the terms Māori, Pākehā and kaipuke (ship).

== Notes ==
New Zealand Parliament
Preceded by Wiremu Parata	Member of Parliament for Western Maori; 1876–1879	Succeeded by Wiremu Te Wheoro
