= Henare Kaihau =

New Zealand politician

New Zealand Parliament
Years	Term	Electorate	Party
1896–1899	13th	Western Maori	Independent
1899–1902	14th	Western Maori	Independent
1902–1905	15th	Western Maori	Independent
1905–1908	16th	Western Maori	Independent
1908–1909	17th	Western Maori	Independent
1909–1911	Changed allegiance to:		Reform

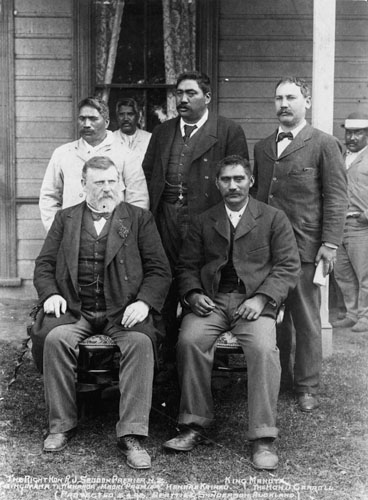
Henare Kaihau (second row, middle). Front row from left: Richard Seddon, Premier; Mahuta Tāwhiao, Maori King. Second row from left: Tupu Taingakawa Te Waharoa, Maori Kingmaker; Henare Kaihau; James Carroll, MP. Taken at Huntly, New Zealand in 1898

Henare Kaihau (1854/1860? – 20 May 1920) was a New Zealand Māori politician, serving as Member of the House of Representatives for the Western Maori electorate.

His birth year is uncertain. The Dictionary of New Zealand Biography gives a range from 1854 to 1860, whereas Wilson gives 1855.

He unsuccessfully contested the Western Maori electorate in the 1884 election. Of eight candidates, he came fifth with 9.7% of the vote. In the 1886 by-election, he came third out of five candidates. In the 1896 election, he defeated Ropata Te Ao, and he held the Western Maori electorate to 1911 when he was defeated by Māui Pōmare.

Wilson notes him as a Reform Party supporter. Kaihau does, however, appear on a poster of the Liberal Party in 1910. The New Zealand Herald, in its 1905 election reporting, also lists him as a government supporter, i.e. a Liberal. Those newspapers that listed political affiliation for Maori candidates for the 1908 election, The Star (Christchurch) and The Tuapeka Times, also show him as a supporter of the Ward Ministry.

New Zealand Parliament
Preceded by Ropata Te Ao	Member of Parliament for Western Maori; 1896–1911	Succeeded by Māui Pōmare
