= Kahe Te Rau-o-te-rangi =

Ngāti Toa leader, trader and innkeeper (died c.1871)

Kahe Te Rau-o-te-rangi (died c. 1871), also known as Betty Nicoll, was a New Zealand leader, trader and innkeeper. She descended from the iwi (tribes) of Ngāti Toa, Ngāti Mutunga and Te Āti Awa. She is known for swimming 11km (7 miles), with her baby daughter strapped to her back, to raise the alarm after a war party from the south attacked her tribe. She was one of only five women to sign the Treaty of Waitangi, and was known as a woman of great mana. In later life, she and her husband kept an inn at Paekākāriki.

== Early life ==
Te Rau-o-te-rangi was the daughter of Te Matoha, Ngāti Toa chief, and Te Hautonga, of Ngāti Mutunga and Te Āti Awa. Her birthplace and date of birth are unknown, but she is thought to have been born either at Kaweka, her mother's village near Urenui, or Tutaerere, south of Kawhia Harbour. In the early 1820s, she took part in Te Rauparaha's migration, a long expedition from Kāwhia to Kapiti Island, and her father fought against the Waikato Tainui iwi.

== Life and legacy ==
Te Rau-o-te-rangi is known for an 11km (7 mile) swim in 1824 from Kapiti Island to Te Uruhi on the mainland, 3km (2 miles) south of Waikanae, with her baby daughter strapped to her back, to raise the alarm after a war party from the south attacked Ngāti Toa. This stretch of water is sometimes named Te Rau-o-te-rangi or Rauoterangi Channel in her honour. She is reported to have said:

I shall go to the mainland ... but I shall not take a canoe, for it would be seen, even the smallest canoe. I shall swim the strait—I shall take my little daughter with me; and I shall rouse the people to save Kapiti.

From around 1832 or 1833 Te Rau-o-te-rangi lived on Kapiti Island with her Pākehā husband, John Nicoll, who was a former whaler. He may have been her second husband. She worked with him as a trader, and the two of them often travelled between the Marlborough Sounds and Kapiti or the mainland. She was described by her daughter around this time as a "strong well proportioned woman of great muscular strength and endurance". In 1834, Te Rau-o-te-rangi and her husband went on a 13-month trip along the Whanganui River to trade with local Māori, a route no European trader had ever taken before.

On 29 April 1840 she signed the Treaty of Waitangi at Port Nicholson. She was one of only five women to sign the treaty, and was regarded by both Māori and Pākehā as being a leader with mana.

On 10 November 1841 she and her husband were formally married on a ship off Kapiti Island by the Rev. John Macfarlane, the Presbyterian minister at Wellington. She was baptised in 1844 by the Rev. Octavius Hadfield and became a supporter of the Anglican mission. From 1845 onwards she and her husband kept an inn at Paekākāriki. One of their frequent guests was Governor George Grey and he took two of their children away to be educated, although both died young. Although she was said to have had as many as twenty children, only three of her children lived to adulthood. One of them, Mere Hautonga, married Wiremu Naera Pōmare, and their eldest child was Māui Pōmare, a doctor and politician.

In 2019, community artist Rachel Benefield worked with children from Paekākāriki School to develop a mural depicting Te Rau-o-te-rangi's story at Paekakariki railway station. The mural was unveiled in September 2019. New Zealand composer Michael Norris wrote a solo piece for piano called Rauoterangi, intended to evoke "the dance of light" on the stretch of sea named for Te Rau-o-te-rangi, which was premiered by pianist Emma Sayers at the New Zealand School of Music in December 2019.
