= Raniera Te Aohou Ratana =

Maōri religious leader

Raniera Te Aohou Rātana was the fifth president of the Rātana Established Church of New Zealand and the last surviving child of its founder Tahupōtiki Wiremu Rātana. He served the presidency from 1995 to 1998. He was succeeded by Harerangi Meihana (Harry Mason), a grandson of T. W. Rātana, in 1999.
