= Toko Ratana =

New Zealand politician and Rātana president (1894–1944)

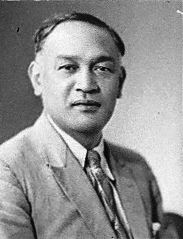
- Ratana in 1935

Member of the New Zealand Parliament for Western Maori
- In office 1935–1944
- Preceded by: Taite Te Tomo
- Succeeded by: Matiu Rātana

Personal details
- Born: Haami Tokouru Ratana; 21 July 1894 Parewanui, New Zealand
- Died: 30 October 1944 (aged 50) Ratana Pa, New Zealand
- Party: Rātana (1922–36); Labour (1936–44)

Haami Tokouru Ratana (21 July 1894 – 30 October 1944) was a New Zealand politician and president of the Rātana Church. He joined Eruera Tirikatene in parliament as the second Rātana Independent Member of Parliament (MP), elected for the Western Maori electorate in 1935. Following the death of his father Tahupotiki Wiremu Ratana in 1939, Toko Ratana became the second Ratana movement president. He held both positions until his death in 1944.

== Early life ==
The eldest son of the founder of the Ratana Church, Toko Ratana was educated at Whangaehu School and was bilingual in English and Māori. After enlisting in the New Zealand Pioneer Battalion during World War I, he served in Gallipoli and later in France, where he suffered the effects of a gas attack. This caused him ill health for the rest of his life.

== Political career ==
New Zealand Parliament
Years	Term	Electorate	Party
1935–1936	25th	Western Maori	Ratana
1936–1938	Changed allegiance to:		Labour
1938–1943	26th	Western Maori	Labour
1943–1944	27th	Western Maori	Labour

Toko Ratana stood unsuccessfully for parliament multiple times. First as an independent candidate for the Western Maori seat against Maui Pomare in 1922. As a Ratana Independent candidate and one of the "first cut of the body of the mangai", he stood against Pomare again in 1928, against Taite Te Tomo in the 1930 by-election after Pomare’s death and again in the 1931 general election.

He was elected in 1935, joining fellow Ratana MP Eruera Tirikatene. In 1936, he joined the Labour Party as the Ratana Movement and Labour formed a political alliance. He was re-elected in 1938 and 1943.

In his maiden speech in October 1937, Toko Ratana raised the principal political issue of Ratana – land grievances and the Treaty of Waitangi. He was to speak in the house only four more times. As the designated leader of the Ratana spiritual movement, the debates were left to Tirikatene and the other Ratana members. H. T. Ratana was frequently ill, and spent long periods in hospital.

== War efforts ==
During the Second World War, Toko Ratana was opposed to conscription but wished to have a home guard manned by Māori to defend their lands. As Kai-Arahi or leader of the Ratana Church, he made a public declaration of the church's support for the war, and supported Māori control over Māori contributions to the war.

== Death ==
Haami Tokouru Ratana died on 30 October 1944 after months of illness. He was succeeded both as MP for Western Maori and Ratana Church President by his younger brother, Matiu Rātana.

== Notes ==
New Zealand Parliament
Preceded by Taite Te Tomo	Member of Parliament for Western Maori; 1935–1944	Succeeded by Matiu Rātana
