= Ngawaka Taurua =

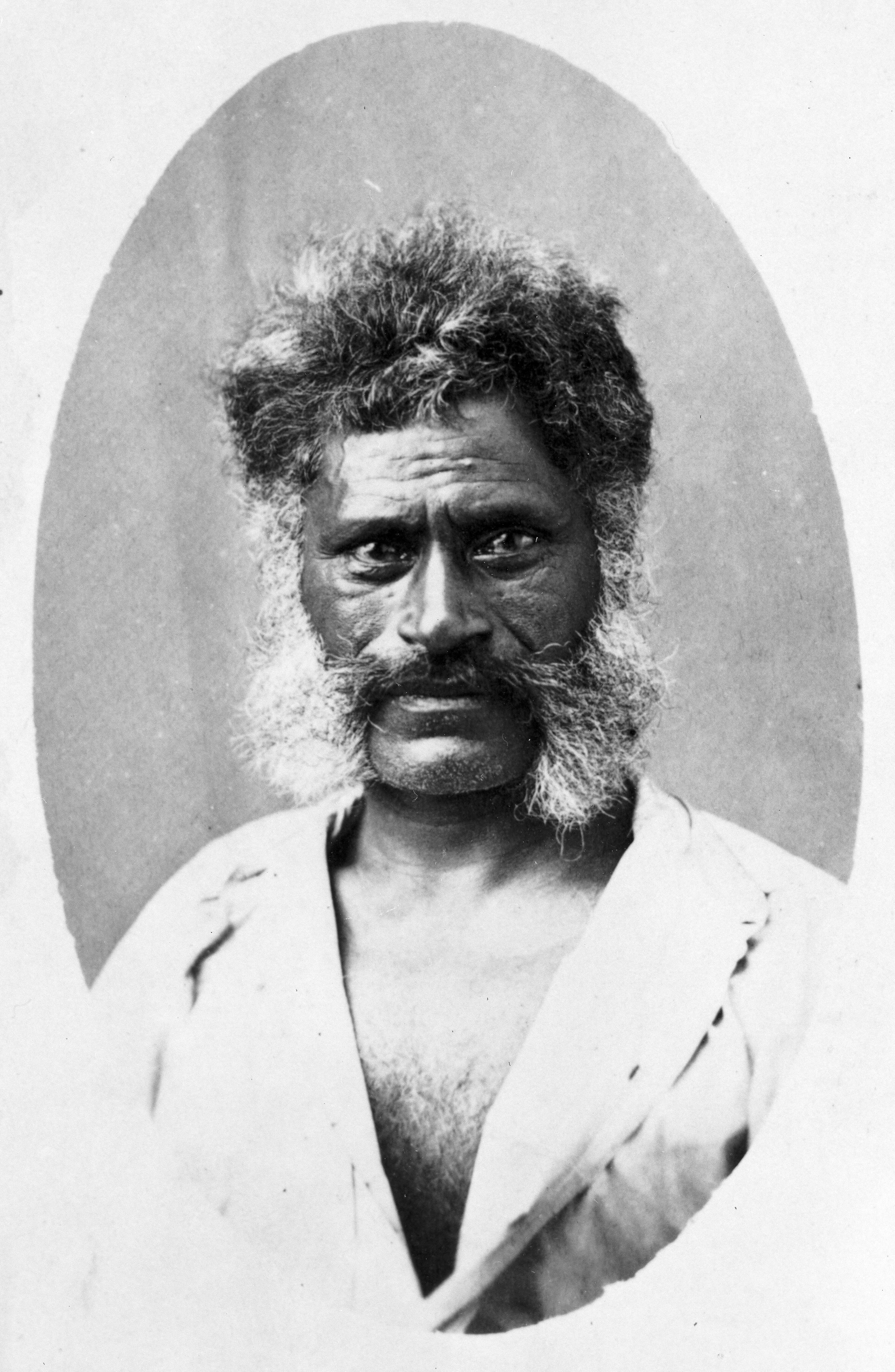
Ngāwaka Taurua, about 1870

Ngawaka Taurua (died 28 April 1888) was leader of Ngāti Hine, a sub-tribe (hapū) of Ngāti Ruanui, a New Zealand Māori tribe (iwi) in the area south of Mount Taranaki.

Taurua taught at Pātea under the Wesleyan catechist William Hough in the 1840s. He would later petition the Wesleyan Church for a minister, and was ultimately responsible for the erection of three churches: Tūtahi, south of Whenuakura, in 1883; Te Takerei-o-Aotea, at Manutahi, in 1888; and Te Kapenga, at Hukatere, in 1889.

In the 1886 by-election in the Western Maori electorate, Taurua came last out of five candidates.

Taurua died 28 April 1888 and was buried at Hukatere.
