= John Ormsby (negotiator) =

New Zealand negotiator (1854–1927)

John Ormsby (6 November 1854 – 11 June 1927), also known under his Māori name Hone Omipi, was a negotiator for the Ngāti Maniapoto iwi, a local politician, farmer, and businessman.

He first stood for the Western Maori electorate in the 1887, when he came fourth out of five candidates. He was one of 13 candidates who contested the Western Maori electorate in the 1896 election.
