= Te Puke Te Ao =

New Zealand politician (1834–1886)

New Zealand Parliament
Years	Term	Electorate	Party
1884–1886	9th	Western Maori	Independent

Te Puke Te Ao (1834 – 28 October 1886) was a 19th-century Māori member of the House of Representatives.

Te Ao was a chief of the Ngāti Raukawa tribe. Early in his life, he was converted by missionaries. Te Ao was a sheep farmer at Ōtaki on the Kāpiti Coast.

He represented the Western Maori electorate from 1884 when he defeated Wiremu Te Wheoro, to 1886 when he died. He was related to Ropata Te Ao, who represented the Western Maori electorate from 1893 to 1896.

New Zealand Parliament
Preceded by Wiremu Te Wheoro	Member of Parliament for Western Maori; 1884–1886	Succeeded by Hoani Taipua
