= Matiu Rātana =

New Zealand politician

Matiu Ratana
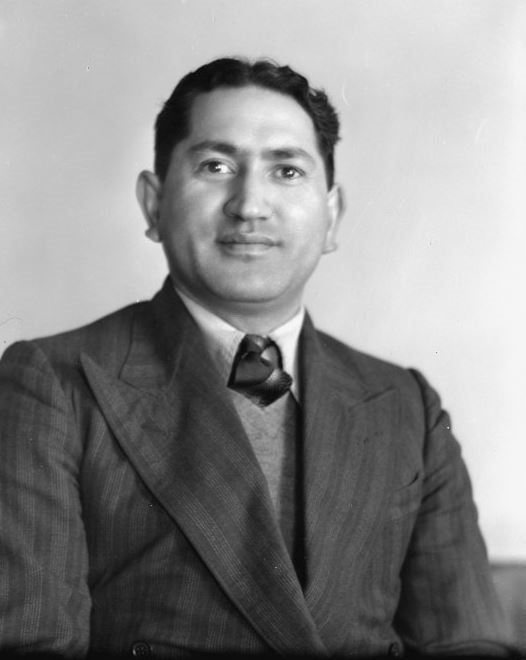

Member of the New Zealand Parliament for Western Maori
- In office 10 February 1945 – 7 October 1949
- Preceded by: Toko Ratana
- Succeeded by: Iriaka Rātana

Personal details
- Born: 16 December 1912 Parewanui, New Zealand
- Died: 7 October 1949 (aged 36) Wanganui, New Zealand
- Party: Labour

Matiu Rātana (16 December 1912 – 7 October 1949), son of Tahupotiki Wiremu Rātana, was a New Zealand politician and president of the Rātana Church.

== Political career ==
New Zealand Parliament
Years	Term	Electorate	Party
1945–1946	27th	Western Maori	Labour
1946–1949	28th	Western Maori	Labour

A son of Tahupōtiki Wiremu Rātana, the founder of the Rātana religion, Matiu Rātana was a younger brother to Haami Tokouru Rātana, whom he succeeded to the Church Presidency, and to the Western Maori electorate (from 10 February 1945, after a by-election) after his brother's death in 1944.

Matiu Rātana died on 7 October 1949 in Wanganui Hospital after a car accident. He was succeeded by his wife Iriaka Rātana as MP. She was the first female Māori MP.

== Sources ==
- Henderson, James Mcleod (1963). Ratana The Man, The Church, The Movement (1st ed.) A.H & A.W. Reed Ltd ISBN 0-589-00619-3.

New Zealand Parliament
Preceded by Haami Tokouru Rātana	Member of Parliament for Western Maori; 1945–1949	Succeeded by Iriaka Rātana
