= Western Maori =

Western Maori was one of New Zealand's four original parliamentary Māori electorates established in 1868, along with Northern Maori, Eastern Maori and Southern Maori. In 1996, with the introduction of MMP, the Maori electorates were updated, and Western Maori was replaced with the Te Tai Hauāuru and Te Puku O Te Whenua electorates.

== Tribal areas ==
The Western Maori electorate extended from South Auckland and the Waikato to Taranaki and the Manawatu. The seat originally went to Wellington. With MMP it was replaced by the Te Tai Hauāuru and Te Puku O Te Whenua electorates in 1996.

The electorate included the following tribal areas: Tainui, Taranaki

== History ==
The first member of parliament for Western Maori from 1868 was Mete Kīngi Paetahi. At the nomination meeting in Wanganui, held at the Courthouse, Paetahi was the only candidate proposed. He was thus elected unopposed. He represented the electorate of Western Maori from 1868 to 1870. He contested the electorate again at the 1871 general election, but of the three candidates, he came last. He was defeated by Wiremu Parata, with Te Keepa Te Rangihiwinui in second place.

In the 1879 election there was some doubt about the validity of the election result, and a law was passed to confirm the result in Western Maori and two other electorates.

From the 1890s to the 1930s the seat was held by various Reform Party MPs. In 1935, Toko Ratana the eldest son of the founder of the Ratana Church won the seat and became the second Ratana MP; he became a Labour MP following the Labour-Ratana pact. From this point until the abolition of the seat prior to the 1996 election the seat was held by Labour MPs.

Toko Ratana died in 1944 and was succeeded by his younger brother, Matiu Rātana. He died in 1949 shortly before the 1949 general election. His wife Iriaka Rātana stood in his stead, despite significant opposition from those supporting traditional leadership roles, with Te Puea Herangi speaking out against her claim to "captain the Tainui canoe". Only the strong backing of the Rātana church and her threat to stand as a Rātana Independent secured her the Labour Party nomination. She became the first woman Maori MP, getting a similar majority (6317) to her husband in 1946 (his majority then was 6491), but no less than seven independent candidates (and one Kauhananui candidate, K Nutana) stood against her; they got 116 to 326 votes each.

Candidates for the National Party (who usually came second) included Hoeroa Marumaru (1946, 1949 & 1951) and Pei Te Hurinui Jones (1957, 1960 and 1963; also earlier).

=== Members of Parliament ===
Western Maori was represented by 15 Members of Parliament:

Key

Independent Reform Ratana Labour

Election	Winner
1868 Māori election	Mete Kīngi Paetahi
1871 election	Wiremu Parata
1876 election	Hoani Nahe
1879 election	Wiremu Te Wheoro
1881 election	Wiremu Te Wheoro
1884 election	Te Puke Te Ao
1886 by-election	Hoani Taipua
1887 election	Hoani Taipua
1890 election	Hoani Taipua
1893 election	Ropata Te Ao
1896 election	Henare Kaihau
1899 election	Henare Kaihau
1902 election	Henare Kaihau
1905 election	Henare Kaihau
1908 election	Henare Kaihau
1911 election	Māui Pōmare
1914 election	Māui Pōmare
1919 election	Māui Pōmare
1922 election	Māui Pōmare
1925 election	Māui Pōmare
1928 election	Māui Pōmare
1930 by-election	Taite Te Tomo
1931 election	Taite Te Tomo
1935 election	Toko Ratana
1938 election	Toko Ratana
1943 election	Toko Ratana
1945 by-election	Matiu Ratana (Note: Matiu Ratana died on 7 October 1949, shortly before the 1949 election. His wife stood for election instead.)
1946 election	Matiu Ratana
1949 election	Iriaka Rātana
1951 election	Iriaka Rātana
1954 election	Iriaka Rātana
1957 election	Iriaka Rātana
1960 election	Iriaka Rātana
1963 election	Iriaka Rātana
1966 election	Iriaka Rātana
1969 election	Koro Wētere
1972 election	Koro Wētere
1975 election	Koro Wētere
1978 election	Koro Wētere
1981 election	Koro Wētere
1984 election	Koro Wētere
1987 election	Koro Wētere
1990 election	Koro Wētere
1993 election	Koro Wētere

== Election results ==
Note that the affiliation of many early candidates is not known. There is contradictory information about the affiliation of Henare Kaihau. In Wilson's New Zealand Parliamentary Record, 1840–1984, the authoritative work covering parliamentary history, Kaihau is listed as a Reform Party supporter from the party's inception in 1908. Kaihau does, however, appear on a poster of the Liberal Party in 1910. The New Zealand Herald, in its 1905 election reporting, also lists him as a government supporter, i.e. a Liberal.

Another example of contradictory reporting is for the 1911 election. Three newspapers, The Marlborough Express, The New Zealand Herald, and the Auckland Star reported political affiliations. Two papers have Māui Pōmare as an independent, whilst the third has him as a Labour supporter. Henare Kaihau is given three different affiliations: independent, Liberal, and Reform. Pepene Eketone is categorised as Labour by two of the papers, whilst the third has him as a Liberal supporter. The Auckland Star lists another Labour supporter, but the name is a composite of first and last names of two of the candidates.

=== 1868 election ===
1868 Māori election: Western Maori
Party	Candidate	Votes	%	±%
Independent	Mete Kīngi Paetahi	Unopposed		

=== 1871 election ===
1871 general election: Western Maori
Party	Candidate	Votes	%	±%
Independent	Wiremu Parata	258	43.07	
Independent	Te Keepa Te Rangihiwinui	186	31.05	
Independent	Mete Kīngi Paetahi	155	25.88	
Majority		72	12.02	
Turnout		599		

=== 1876 election ===
1876 general election: Western Maori
Party	Candidate	Votes	%	±%
Independent	Hoani Nahe	671	46.24	
Independent	Te Keepa Te Rangihiwinui	490	33.77	+2.72
Independent	Wiremu Parata	290	19.99	−23.09
Majority		181	12.47	+0.45
Turnout		1,451		

=== 1879 election ===
1879 general election: Western Maori
Party	Candidate	Votes	%	±%
Independent	Wiremu Te Wheoro	1,053	70.48	
Independent	Hoani Taipua	441	29.52	
Majority		612	40.96	+31.05
Turnout		1,494		

=== 1881 election ===
1881 general election: Western Maori
Party	Candidate	Votes	%	±%
Independent	Wiremu Te Wheoro	991	69.20	−1.28
Independent	Hāmiora Mangakāhia	223	15.57	
Independent	Mita Karaka	143	9.99	
Independent	William Hughes	75	5.24	
Majority		768	53.63	+12.67
Turnout		1,432		

=== 1884 election ===
1884 general election: Western Maori
Party	Candidate	Votes	%	±%
Independent	Te Puke Te Ao	356	25.21	
Independent	Te Keepa Te Rangihiwinui	284	20.11	
Independent	Wiremu Te Wheoro	155	10.98	
Independent	Wetere Te Rerenga	141	9.99	
Independent	Henare Kaihau	137	9.70	
Independent	Mita Karaka	136	9.63	−0.35
Independent	Hāmiora Mangakāhia	125	8.85	−6.72
Independent	Sydney Taiwhanga	78	5.52	
Majority		72	5.10	−48.53
Turnout		1,412		

=== 1886 by-election ===
1886 Western Maori by-election
Party	Candidate	Votes	%	±%
Independent	Hoani Taipua	1,258	56.67	
Independent	Wiremu Te Wheoro	519	23.38	+12.40
Independent	Henare Kaihau	225	10.14	+0.43
Independent	Sydney Taiwhanga	148	6.67	+1.14
Independent	Ngawaka Taurua	70	3.15	
Majority		739	33.29	+28.19
Turnout		2,220		

=== 1887 election ===
1887 general election: Western Maori
Party	Candidate	Votes	%	±%
Independent	Hoani Taipua	1,691	53.68	−2.98
Independent	Wiremu Te Wheoro	1,067	33.87	+10.49
Independent	Pepene Eketone	198	6.29	
Independent	John Ormsby	153	4.86	
Independent	Takarangi Mete Kingi	41	1.30	
Majority		624	19.81	−13.48
Turnout		3,150		

=== 1890 election ===
1890 general election: Western Maori
Party	Candidate	Votes	%	±%
Conservative	Hoani Taipua (Note: Final results were not reported in contemporary media)			
	Pepene Eketone			
	Kipa Te Whatanui (Note: Rankings from the third place down are based on preliminary results only)			
	Te Kahui Kararahe			
	Tatana Te Whataupoko			
Majority				
Turnout		1,916		

=== 1893 election ===
1893 general election: Western Maori
Party	Candidate	Votes	%	±%
Liberal	Ropata Te Ao	817	42.64	
	Pepene Eketone	727	37.94	
	Te Wirihana Hunia	365	19.05	
	Ngarangi Katitia	334	17.43	
	Reha Aperahama	274	14.30	
	Eruera Whakaahu	224	11.69	
Majority		90	4.70	
Turnout		1,916		

=== 1896 election ===
1896 general election: Western Maori
Party	Candidate	Votes	%	±%
	Henare Kaihau	1,605	26.70	
Liberal	Ropata Te Ao	874	14.54	−28.10
	Te Keepa Te Rangihiwinui	854	14.20	
	Ngarangi Katitia	655	10.89	−6.54
	John Ormsby	575	9.56	
	Te Aohau Nikitini	431	7.17	
	Pepene Eketone	351	5.84	−32.11
	Wiremu Ngapaki	261	4.34	
	Reha Aperahama	186	3.09	−11.21
	Te Remana Nutana	158	2.63	
	Te Wirihana Hunia	37	0.62	−18.43
	Hohepa Horomona	8	0.13	
Majority		731	12.16	+7.46
Turnout		6,012 (Note: The source says 6,022, but the votes add up to 6,012. Whilst the source states the count was final, McRobie states the number of votes cast as 6,072.)		

=== 1899 election ===
1899 general election: Western Maori
Party	Candidate	Votes	%	±%
	Henare Kaihau	2,685	52.69	+25.99
	Tureiti Te Heuheu Tukino V	873	17.13	
	Te Aohau Nikitini	581	11.40	+4.23
	Waata Hipango	440	8.63	
	Hone Patene	199	3.91	
	Takarangi Mete Kingi	173	3.39	
	Wiremu Ngapaki	145	2.85	−1.50
Majority		1,812	35.56	+23.40
Turnout		5,096		

=== 1902 election ===
1902 general election: Western Maori
Party	Candidate	Votes	%	±%
	Henare Kaihau	3,324	53.05	+0.36
	Ngarangi Katitia	954	15.23	
	Tureiti Te Heuheu Tukino V	840	13.41	−3.73
	Eruera te Kahu	673	10.74	
	Te One Teehi	399	6.37	
	Te Weraro Kingi	76	1.21	
Majority		2,370	37.82	+2.27
Turnout		6,266		

=== 1905 election ===
1905 general election: Western Maori
Party	Candidate	Votes	%	±%
	Henare Kaihau	3,026	50.14	−2.91
Independent	Tureiti Te Heuheu Tukino V	1,338	22.17	+8.76
Liberal	Eruera te Kahu	991	16.42	
Independent	Pitiera Taipua	394	6.53	
Independent	Te Weraro Kingi	162	2.68	+1.47
Independent	Hare Teimana	124	2.05	
Majority		1,688	27.97	−9.85
Turnout		6,035		

=== 1908 election ===
1908 general election: Western Maori
Party	Candidate	Votes	%	±%
	Henare Kaihau	2,375	32.65	−17.49
	Pepene Eketone	1,618	22.24	
	Tureiti Te Heuheu Tukino V	1,375	18.90	−3.27
	Hema Te Ao	1,178	16.19	
	Eruera te Kahu	728	10.01	−6.41
Majority		757	10.41	−17.56
Turnout		7,274		

=== 1911 election ===
1911 general election: Western Maori
Party	Candidate	Votes	%	±%
Independent	Māui Pōmare	2,464	35.24	
	Henare Kaihau	1,899	27.16	−5.49
	Pepene Eketone	1,470	21.02	−1.22
	Tarapipipi Taingakawa	581	8.31	
	Ngarangi Katitia	560	8.01	
	Pomare Hetaraka	19	0.27	
Majority		565	8.08	−2.33
Turnout		6,993		

=== 1914 election ===
1914 general election: Western Maori
Party	Candidate	Votes	%	±%
Reform	Māui Pōmare	3,416	50.29	+15.05
Liberal	Hema Ropata te Ao (Note: Some sources have Hema Ropata te Ao as an independent)	1,309	19.27	
Liberal	Pepene Eketone	1,074	15.81	−5.21
Liberal–Labour	Rangi Mawhete	703	10.35	
Independent	Hori Tiro Paora	166	2.44	
Reform	Tuwhakaririka Patena (Note: Some sources have Tuwhakaririka Patena as an independent)	125	1.84	
Majority		2,107	31.02	+22.94
Turnout		6,793		

=== 1930 by-election ===
1930 Western Maori by-election
Party	Candidate	Votes	%	±%
Reform	Taite Te Tomo	3,921	53.29	
Ratana	Toko Ratana	3,101	42.14	
Independent	Pei Te Hurinui Jones	336	4.57	
Majority		820	11.14	
Turnout		7,358		

=== 1931 election ===
1931 general election: Western Maori
Party	Candidate	Votes	%	±%
Reform	Taite Te Tomo	4,172	53.54	
Ratana	Toko Ratana	2,736	35.11	
Independent	Rima Wakarua	394	5.06	
	Pepene Eketone	293	3.76	
	Hane Henare Piahana	103	1.32	
United	Timi Takirihi (James Douglas)	95	1.22	
Majority		1,436	18.43	
Turnout		7,793		

=== 1945 by-election ===
1945 Western Maori by-election
Party	Candidate	Votes	%	±%
Labour	Matiu Ratana	4,697	53.63	
National	Pei Te Hurinui Jones	2,908	33.20	
Independent	Winiata Piahana	452	5.16	
Independent	Takumaru Roetana Tupaea	371	4.24	
Independent	Rehe Parene Rewi Maniapoto Amohanga	111	1.27	
Independent	Pepiriri Reweti	108	1.23	
Independent Labour	Kaponga Erueti	93	1.06	
Independent	Reha Kau Hou	41	0.47	
Majority		1,789	19.16	
Informal votes		554		
Turnout		9,335		
