= Waata Pihikete Kukutai =

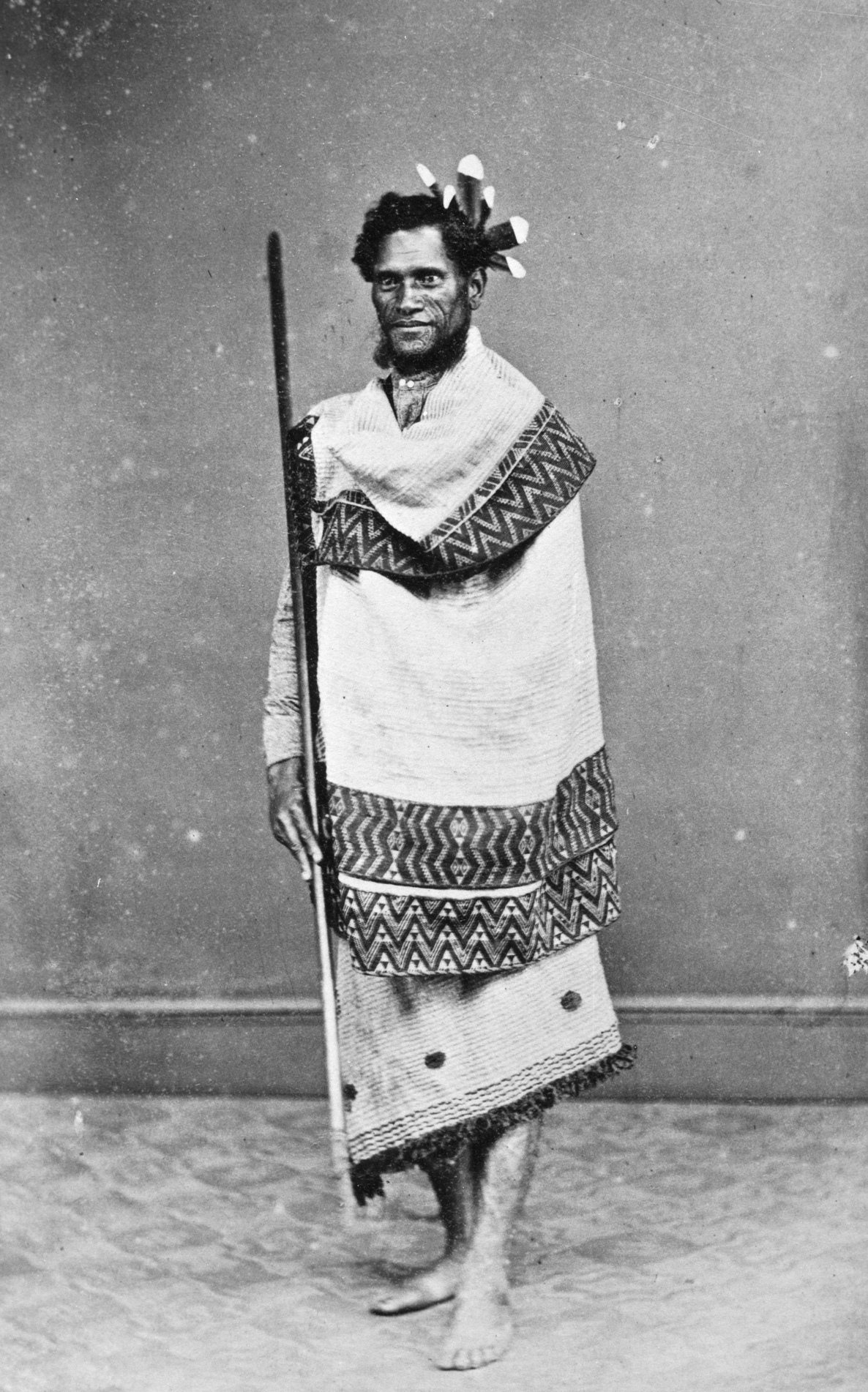
Waata Pihikete Kūkūtai. Ngāti Tīpā. From 'Sir George Grey Special Collections, Auckland Libraries.

Waata Pihikete Kukutai (died 8 January 1867) was a New Zealand Māori tribal leader, farmer and assessor. He identified with the Ngāti Tipa and Waikato iwi.

Waata Kukutai's parents were Kukutai I and Oiroa Muriwhenua, of Ngati Hourua. He was interviewed by government officials in 1857 while the government was considering what action to take over a rising demand by Waikato Māori for law and order in the district to replace ancient tikanga which had fallen into disuse. At an 1857 meeting at Paetai, near Rangiriri, to discuss proposals for a Māori kingship, Kukutai led a contingent that paraded under the Union Jack. Although opposed to land-selling, he spoke against the establishment of the kingship and supported the appointment of magistrates, laws and a form of rūnanga or council.

Governor George Grey agreed to meet those demands. The Government introduced written laws, magistrates and courts, built a printing press to inform Māori of government decisions and helped establish a trade school in the Te Awamutu area where Christianity was popular among Maori. In 1861 Grey appointed Kukutai as a head Māori magistrate and government adviser.

Kukutai and Wiremu Te Wheoro assisted British forces in the military invasion of the Waikato in July 1863, building and occupying a pa at Te Ia, (near Mercer) and transporting supplies for the British from steamers at Waikato Heads upriver to the Camerontown redoubt, until the supply line was severed by a Ngati Maniapoto attack in September. Kukutai fought with the Kingitanga forces at Rangiriri in November 1863. He was appointed as a major in the New Zealand militia.

In December 1866 Kukutai poisoned himself following his wife's death; he died a month later aged 45.
