= Hoani Taipua =

New Zealand politician (?-1896)

New Zealand Parliament
Years	Term	Electorate	Party
1886–1887	9th	Western Maori	Independent
1887–1890	10th	Western Maori	Independent
1890–1893	11th	Western Maori	Independent

Hoani Te Puna i Rangiriri Taipua (1839 or 1840 – 29/30 September 1896) was a 19th-century Māori member of the New Zealand House of Representatives.

He was born at Rangiuru Pa, Ōtaki to his parents Te Puna I Rangiriri and Te Ria Haukoraki. Both his parents were also a part of the Ngāti Raukawa migration to Ōtaki from Maungatautari. He is of Ngati Pare descent, and is also kin to Ngati Huia and Ngāti Toa. He was born of a very high chiefly status.

He represented the Western Maori electorate from the 1886 by-election after the death of Te Puke Te Ao to 1893 when he retired.

He was married to Hiria Te Mahauariki a.k.a. Amokura, whom he had numerous children with. Today his descendants still live in the Ōtaki area.

New Zealand Parliament
Preceded by Te Puke Te Ao	Member of Parliament for Western Maori; 1886–1893	Succeeded by Ropata Te Ao
