= Rātana Pā =

Settlement in Manawatū-Whanganui Region, New Zealand

Ratana Community Rātana Pā
- Town
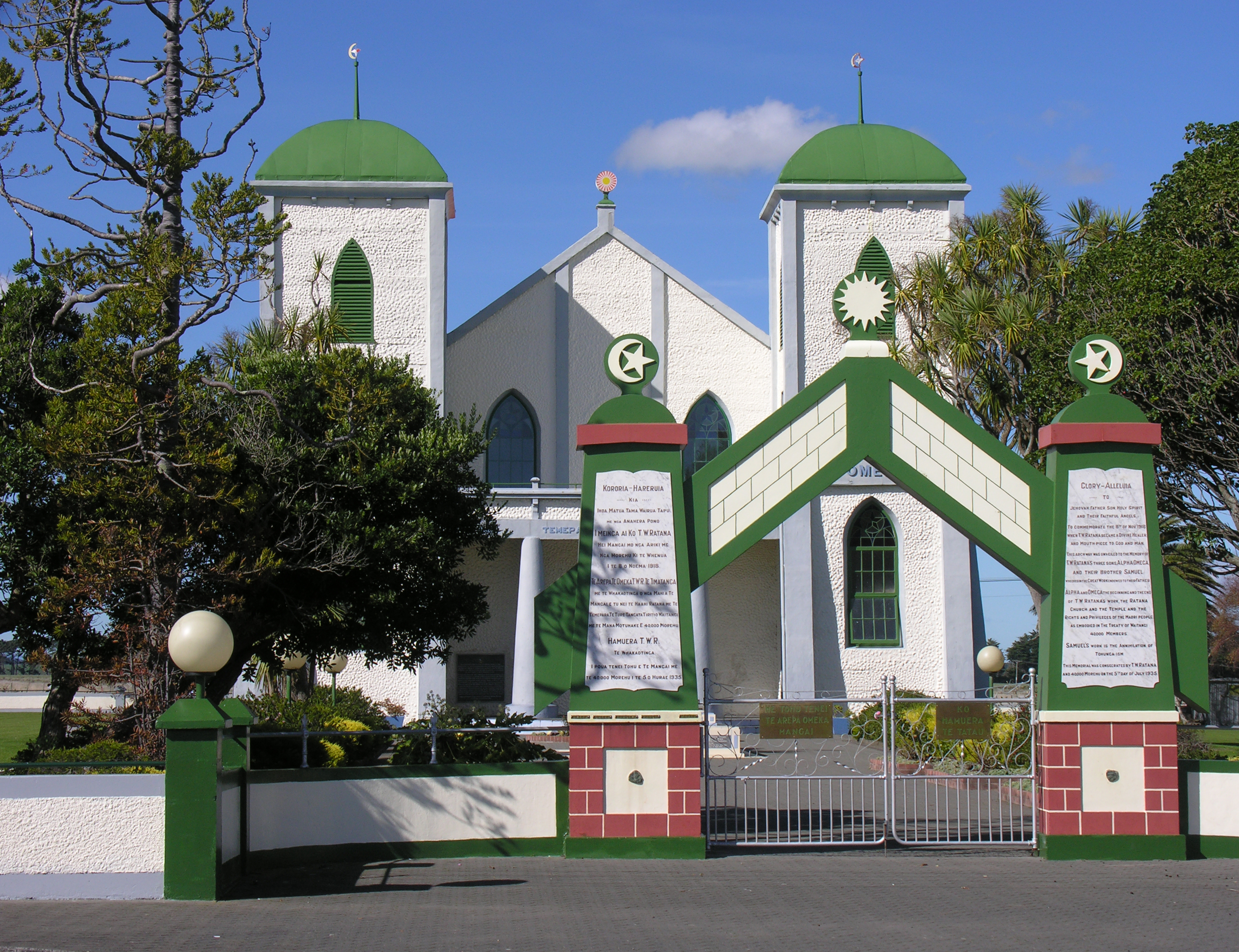
- The temple at Rātana Pā
- Interactive map of Ratana Community
- Coordinates: 40°02′24″S 175°10′40″E
- Country: New Zealand
- Region: Manawatū-Whanganui
- District: Rangitikei District
- Wards: Southern General Ward; Tiikeitia ki Uta (Inland) Māori Ward
- Electorates: Rangitīkei; Te Tai Hauāuru (Māori)

Government
  - Territorial Authority: Rangitikei District Council
  - Regional council: Horizons Regional Council
  - Mayor of Rangitikei: Andy Watson
  - Rangitīkei MP: Suze Redmayne
  - Te Tai Hauāuru MP: Debbie Ngarewa-Packer

Area
  - Total: 0.29 km^{2} (0.11 sq mi)

Population (June 2025)
  - Total: 370
  - Density: 1,300/km^{2} (3,300/sq mi)

Rātana Pā, or Ratana Community, (Note: As defined by Statistics New Zealand.) is a town in the North Island of New Zealand, near Whanganui and Marton in the Manawatū-Whanganui region. The locality was the farm of Tahupōtiki Wiremu Rātana, the founder of a Māori religious and political movement, and the settlement developed in the 1920s as followers came to see Rātana. Pilgrims flocked there in the interwar years to seek healing from Rātana, and after his death continued to visit on religious and political pilgrimages. It continues as the centre of the Rātana Church. Due to the importance of the Rātana movement in New Zealand politics, leading New Zealand politicians often attend annual gatherings at Rātana Pā.

== Location ==
Rātana Pā is 20 km south-east of Whanganui, 5 km west of Turakina and 19 km west of Marton. It lies between State Highway 3 and the coast.

== History ==
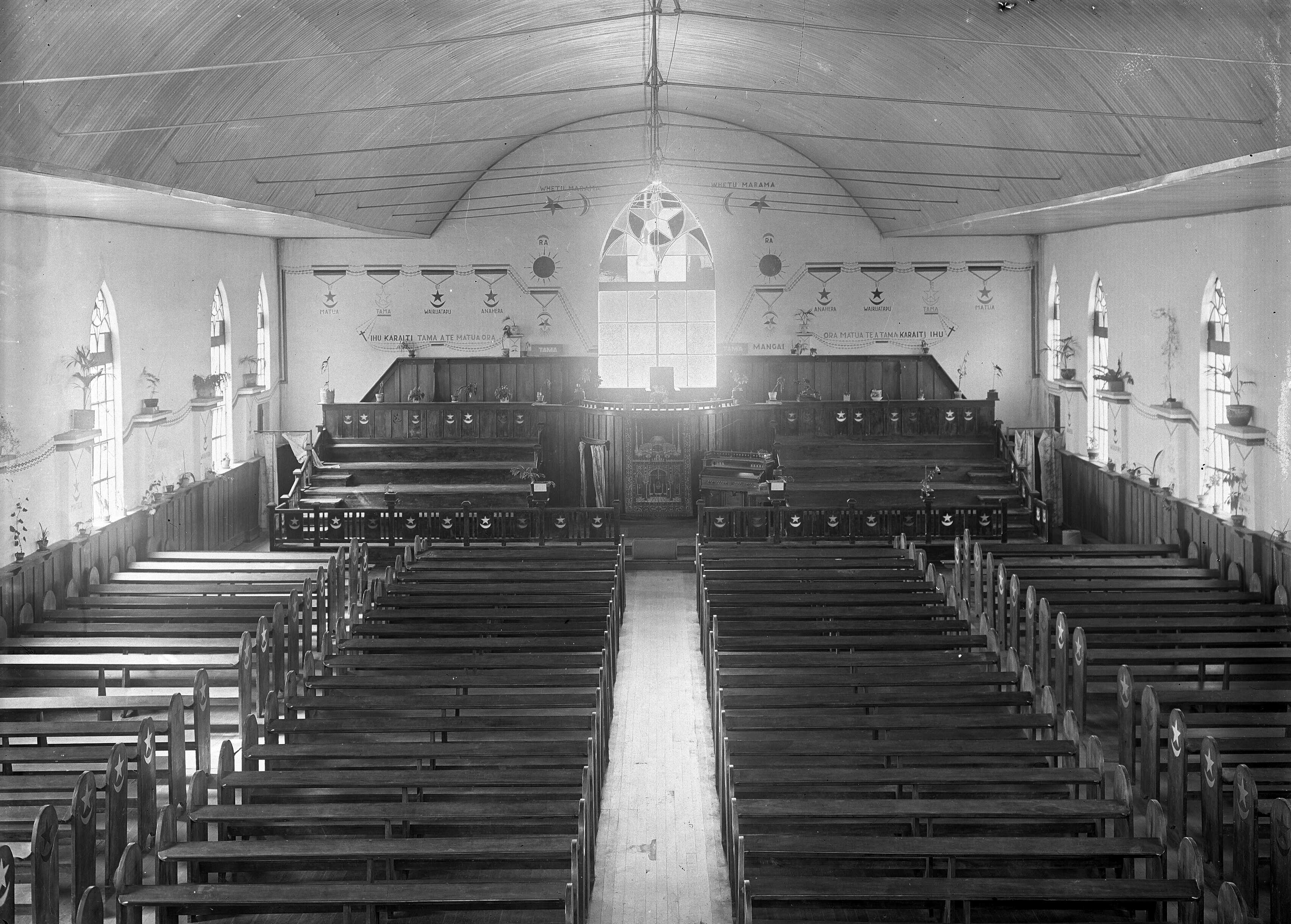
Temple interior

Rātana Pā is on what was the farm of Tahupōtiki Wiremu Rātana, the founder of the Rātana religious and political movement and the Rātana Church. The locality became a settlement of Rātana followers in the 1920s.

Facilities at Rātana Pā include the 1,000-seat Temepara Tapu o Ihoa (Holy Temple of Jehovah), the Manuao (an accommodation facility and head office of the church), the Whare Māori (which contains crutches and wheelchairs from followers who were healed by Rātana in the 1920s and 1930s) and the Ratana Archives Centre, which contains artefacts and stories from the history of the Rātana Church.

25 January and 8 November are anniversary days of the Rātana Church. On these days thousands of members of the church converge on Rātana Pā for the special anniversary services commemorating the birth of Rātana (25 January 1873) and his first spiritual vision (8 November 1918). The gathering for the birth anniversary lasts for a week, with the highlight being the Temple Service on 25 January. Usually, Members of Parliament (MPs) visit on 24 January to talk and seek the votes of Māori.

On 10 November 2024, the Sixth National Government allocated NZ$10.1 million from the Regional Infrastructure Fund to building upgrades and repairs at Rātana Pā.

== Government and politics ==
=== Local government ===
Rātana Pā is in the Southern ward of Rangitikei District, which elects two of the eleven members of the Rangitikei District Council. There is also a Rātana Community Board, one of two community boards in the District (the other being for Taihape). The Board has four elected members and one appointed councillor from the Southern ward.

=== National government ===
Rātana Pā, like the rest of the Rangitikei District, is located in the general electorate of Rangitīkei and in the Māori electorate of Te Tai Hauāuru. Rangitīkei is a safe National Party seat since the 1938 election with the exception of 1978–1984 when it was held by Bruce Beetham of the Social Credit Party. Since 2023 it has been held by Suze Redmayne.

Te Tai Hauāuru is a more volatile seat, having been held by three different parties since 1996, i.e. New Zealand First, Te Pāti Māori and the Labour Party. Since 2023 it has been held by Debbie Ngarewa-Packer of the Māori Party.

== Demographics ==
Rātana is described by Statistics New Zealand as a rural settlement. It covers 0.29 km^{2} (0.11 sq mi) and had an estimated population of 370 as of June 2025, with a population density of 1,276 people per km^{2}. It is part of the larger Turakina statistical area.

Historical population
| Year | Pop. | ±% p.a. |
|---|---|---|
| 2001 | 423 | — |
| 2006 | 369 | −2.69% |
| 2013 | 330 | −1.58% |
| 2018 | 348 | +1.07% |
| 2023 | 351 | +0.17% |
The 2006 population is for a smaller area of 0.21 km^{2}. The 2001 area may have been the same as in 2006. Source:

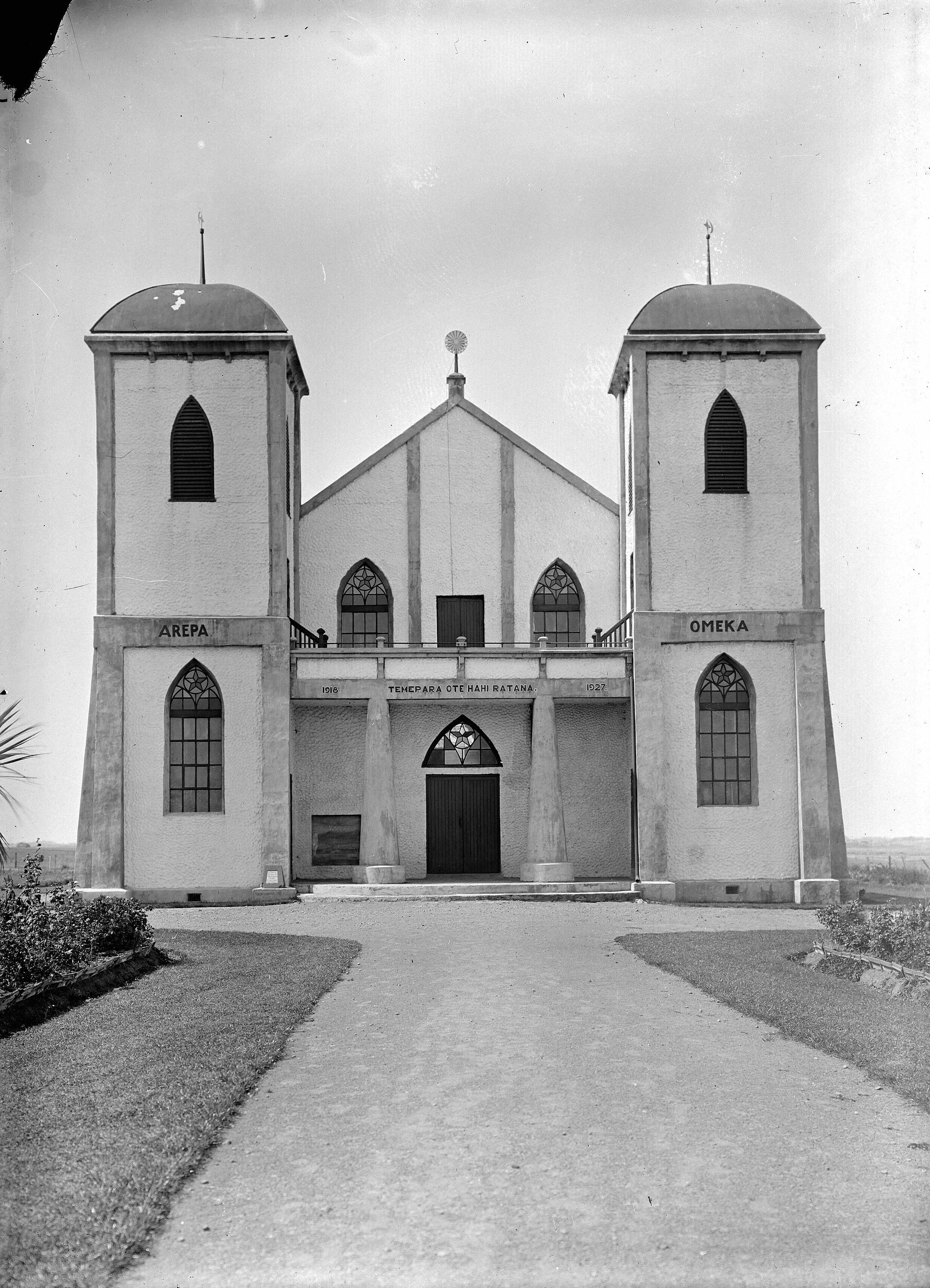
The temple circa 1930

Rātana had a population of 351 in the 2023 New Zealand census, an increase of 3 people (0.9%) since the 2018 census, and an increase of 21 people (6.4%) since the 2013 census. There were 156 males and 195 females in 108 dwellings. 2.6% of people identified as LGBTIQ+. The median age was 39.4 years (compared with 38.1 years nationally). There were 66 people (18.8%) aged under 15 years, 72 (20.5%) aged 15 to 29, 162 (46.2%) aged 30 to 64, and 51 (14.5%) aged 65 or older.

People could identify as more than one ethnicity. The results were 12.0% European (Pākehā), 95.7% Māori, 3.4% Pasifika, 0.9% Asian, and 1.7% other, which includes people giving their ethnicity as "New Zealander". English was spoken by 94.0%, Māori by 41.0%, Samoan by 1.7%, and other languages by 0.9%. No language could be spoken by 2.6% (e.g. too young to talk). The percentage of people born overseas was 1.7, compared with 28.8% nationally.

Religious affiliations were 6.0% Christian, and 86.3% Māori religious beliefs. People who answered that they had no religion were 6.0%, and 2.6% of people did not answer the census question.

Of those at least 15 years old, 42 (14.7%) people had a bachelor's or higher degree, 153 (53.7%) had a post-high school certificate or diploma, and 90 (31.6%) people exclusively held high school qualifications. The median income was $34,000, compared with $41,500 nationally. 9 people (3.2%) earned over $100,000 compared to 12.1% nationally. The employment status of those at least 15 was 150 (52.6%) full-time, 27 (9.5%) part-time, and 15 (5.3%) unemployed.

== Transport ==
State Highway 3 is located 2 km (1.2 mi) to the northeast of Rātana Pā. This national state highway connects Woodville (25 km (16 mi) east of Palmerston North) and Hamilton via New Plymouth.

InterCity runs three daily and six non-daily services at the Ratana Turn Off stop. These include Palmerston North–Auckland, Wellington–New Plymouth and Auckland–Palmerston North.

The nearest airport is Whanganui Airport, located 22 km (14 mi) to the northwest of the town.

Rātana had a railway station on the Marton–New Plymouth line from 27 April 1898, for goods, and 23 May for passengers. It had a shelter shed, platform, loading bank and a small passing loop. The station closed on 7 December 1947, when the Turakina Deviation diverted the railway away from Rātana. Seven died due to a crash on 26 March 1938, 1 mi 15 ch (1.9 km) from the station, to the north of Lake Waipu.

== Education ==
Te Kura o Ratana is a state-integrated co-educational Rātana Church primary school for Year 1 to 8 students, with a roll of 61 as of July 2026.

The nearest secondary schools are in Whanganui and Marton.
