= Māui Pōmare =

New Zealand politician, doctor and health reformer (1875 or 1876 – 1930)

The Honourable Sir Māui Pōmare KBE CMG
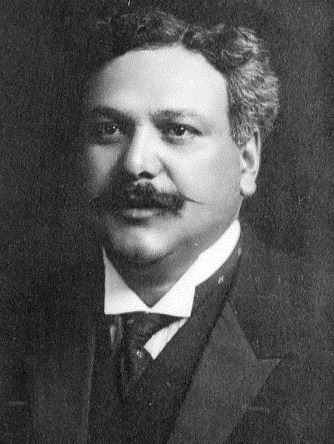
- Pōmare c. 1919

9th Minister of Internal Affairs
- In office 25 August 1927 – 10 December 1928
- Prime Minister: Gordon Coates
- Preceded by: James Parr
- Succeeded by: Alexander Young

3rd Minister of Statistics
- In office 25 August 1927 – 10 December 1928
- Prime Minister: Gordon Coates
- Preceded by: Richard Bollard
- Succeeded by: Philip De La Perrelle

8th Minister of Health
- In office 7 June 1923 – 18 January 1926
- Prime Minister: William Massey; Francis Bell; Gordon Coates
- Preceded by: James Parr
- Succeeded by: Alexander Young

Minister without portfolio
- In office 10 July 1912 – 3 May 1916
- Prime Minister: William Massey

Member of the New Zealand Parliament for Western Maori
- In office 7 December 1911 – 27 June 1930
- Preceded by: Henare Kaihau
- Succeeded by: Taite Te Tomo

Personal details
- Born: 1875 or 1876 Urenui, New Zealand
- Died: 27 June 1930 (aged 54) Glendale, California, United States
- Party: Reform
- Spouse: Mira Woodbine Johnston
- Children: Rakaherea Woodbine Pomare
- Father: Wiremu Naera Pōmare
- Mother: Mere Hautonga Nicoll
- Grandmother: Kahe Te Rau-o-te-rangi

Sir Māui Wiremu Piti Naera Pōmare KBE CMG (1875 or 1876 – 27 June 1930) was a New Zealand medical doctor and politician, being counted among the more prominent Māori political figures. He is particularly known for his efforts to improve Māori health and living conditions. His career was not without controversy: he negotiated the effective removal of the last of Taranaki Māori land from its native inhabitants – some 18,000 acres – in a move that has been described as the "final disaster" for his people. He was a member of the Ngāti Mutunga iwi, which was originally from North Taranaki, migrated to Wellington, and then invaded and settled the Chatham Islands in 1835.

== Early life ==
The date of Pōmare's birth is unclear—school records give 24 August 1875 but most other sources give 13 January 1876. He was born at Pāhau pā at Onaero in northern Taranaki. His father Wiremu Naera Pōmare was of Ngāti Mutunga and was the adopted son of Wiremu Piti Pōmare. His mother Mere Hautonga Nicoll was the daughter of Kahe Te Rau-o-te-rangi of Ngāti Toa, a signatory of the Treaty of Waitangi, and John Nicoll, a Pākehā sailor, whaler and trader.

Pōmare attended schools at Waitara, the Chathams Islands and Auckland. His parents were followers of Te Whiti and sometimes lived at Parihaka, and Pōmare lost a toe there as a boy when a horse trod on his foot. His father died in 1885 and his mother when he was in his early teens, leaving him in the guardianship of his aunt, Hēni Te Rau Nicoll.

== Education ==
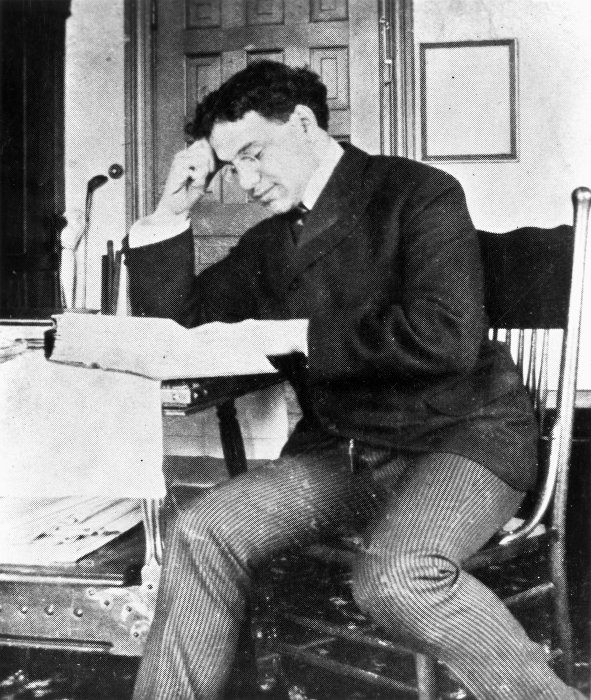
Pomare in 1899

Pōmare attended primary schools at Waitara and the Chatham Islands, St Stephen's Native Boys' School in Parnell, Auckland, Christchurch Boys' High School and then Te Aute College. Although his family wanted him to study law Pōmare decided to become a doctor and, in 1895, he began study at a Seventh-day Adventist Church medical college at Battle Creek in the US state of Michigan. He remained in the United States until 1900 and travelled extensively.

== Department of Health ==
At the time of Pōmare's return to New Zealand there was considerable concern about public health, with the quality of housing and sanitation being a major political issue. The problem was particularly pressing in Māori communities and Pōmare, as one of a small number of trained Māori doctors, was selected to serve as Māori Health Officer in the Department of Health. In this role he undertook a number of major campaigns to improve Māori health and met with considerable success. Pōmare was highly active in the everyday work of his office, often walking to remote villages to give public speeches. His frequent lectures on health matters gave him considerable skill in oratory.

In contrast to some of his friends, notably Āpirana Ngata, Pōmare was not particularly concerned about the loss of Māori cultural identity. While Pōmare and Ngata agreed on the need to modernise Māori living conditions, Pōmare did not share Ngata's drive to preserve and protect traditional Māori culture and arts—instead Pōmare believed that, eventually, Pākehā and Māori would merge to form a single culture incorporating the best aspects of both (a common ideal of his iwi).

== Member of Parliament ==
New Zealand Parliament
Years	Term	Electorate	Party
1911–1914	18th	Western Maori	Independent
1914–1919	19th	Western Maori	Reform
1919–1922	20th	Western Maori	Reform
1922–1925	21st	Western Maori	Reform
1925–1928	22nd	Western Maori	Reform
1928–1930	23rd	Western Maori	Reform

In the 1911 election, Pōmare stood for the House of Representatives as an independent in the Western Maori electorate that covered the western part of the North Island from Wellington to just south of Auckland, plus the east coast from Tauranga north. Aided by support from the Māori King, Mahuta Tāwhiao, he was successful, displacing the incumbent Henare Kaihau. He was aligned with the new Reform Party that had won the largest number of seats. When the party formed a government, Pōmare was appointed in July 1912 to Cabinet as a minister without portfolio, a largely symbolic position. Pōmare was quite popular with his party—in part this is likely because he did not promote an independent Māori cultural identity and that fitted well with the Reform Party's generally conservative views. (Meanwhile, Pōmare's old friend, Āpirana Ngata, was serving as an MP for the opposition Liberal Party.)

== Taranaki land negotiation ==
In 1881 the Crown had set aside 187,000 acres for Taranaki Māori "absolutely and for all time". By 1911 only 18,000 acres remained and it was being leased to settlers on the behalf of Māori, although in an act of defiance of land confiscation, local Māori never claimed the rent. Both Waikato and Taranaki elected Māui Pōmare as the member for Western Maori to ensure this 18,000 acres would not become freehold settler property in perpetuity. In 1913 Pōmare attempted to appease both his people and Pākehā settlers by extending the lease settlers had for a further 10 years after which it would revert to Māori ownership – provided they pay compensation to settlers for appreciation in value. In 1923 Māori reclaimed their 18,000 acres, but Pōmare had converted the land from leasehold to freehold, something his people were woefully unprepared to deal with. Overwhelmed by a system they did not understand, the Māori sold back to the Pākehā settlers, who now had this last 18,000 acres in perpetuity.

== World War I ==
During World War I Pōmare and Ngata joined forces to encourage Māori to join the armed forces. They both believed that by participating strongly in the war and fighting to defend the country, Māori would demonstrate to Pākehā that they were full citizens. However, some tribes in Pōmare's own electorate were reluctant. Taranaki was only mildly in support and Waikato was quite opposed, having not forgotten their fate in the New Zealand Wars and consequent land confiscations. Pōmare angered many of his constituents by extending conscription to Māori under the Military Service Act 1916.

When Pōmare went to Waahi Pa late in the war to try to change the minds of Waikato Māori, he was greeted in this manner: "He was met at the station by a hostile crowd and escorted to the riverside where he was a spectator of an event never before recorded in European times. When the old-time Maoris wished to demonstrate their most extreme measure of contempt for any person they danced a haka standing naked and waist high in a river and at appropriate times in the dance turned their posteriors towards the unwelcome visitor. There were no greater depths of ignominy in the Maori repertoire of insults – it was the absolute in loathing and contumely. Such was the spectacle confronting the Member for Western Maori ...".

== Ministerial career ==
In April 1916, Pōmare was given ministerial responsibility for the Cook Islands, then a New Zealand territory. He lobbied strongly for more funding to be given to the islands and was responsible for considerable infrastructural improvement. He opposed, however, the idea of self-governance for the islands, saying that they were not yet ready for it. On a number of occasions he overrode laws passed by the islands' own council, causing a certain amount of complaint. On the whole, however, he was well regarded in the Cook Islands, being presented with a silver cup at the end of his service.

Later, in May 1925, Pōmare was appointed Minister of Health, his highest office. Due to economic problems the Health Department's budget was low, making it difficult for him to effect any important reforms. Nevertheless, he managed to make gains in some areas, particularly maternity care and equipment sterilisation.

Pōmare was appointed Companion of the Order of St Michael and St George (CMG) in the 1920 New Year Honours, and Knight Commander of the Order of the British Empire (KBE) in the 1922 King's Birthday Honours.

== Later life ==
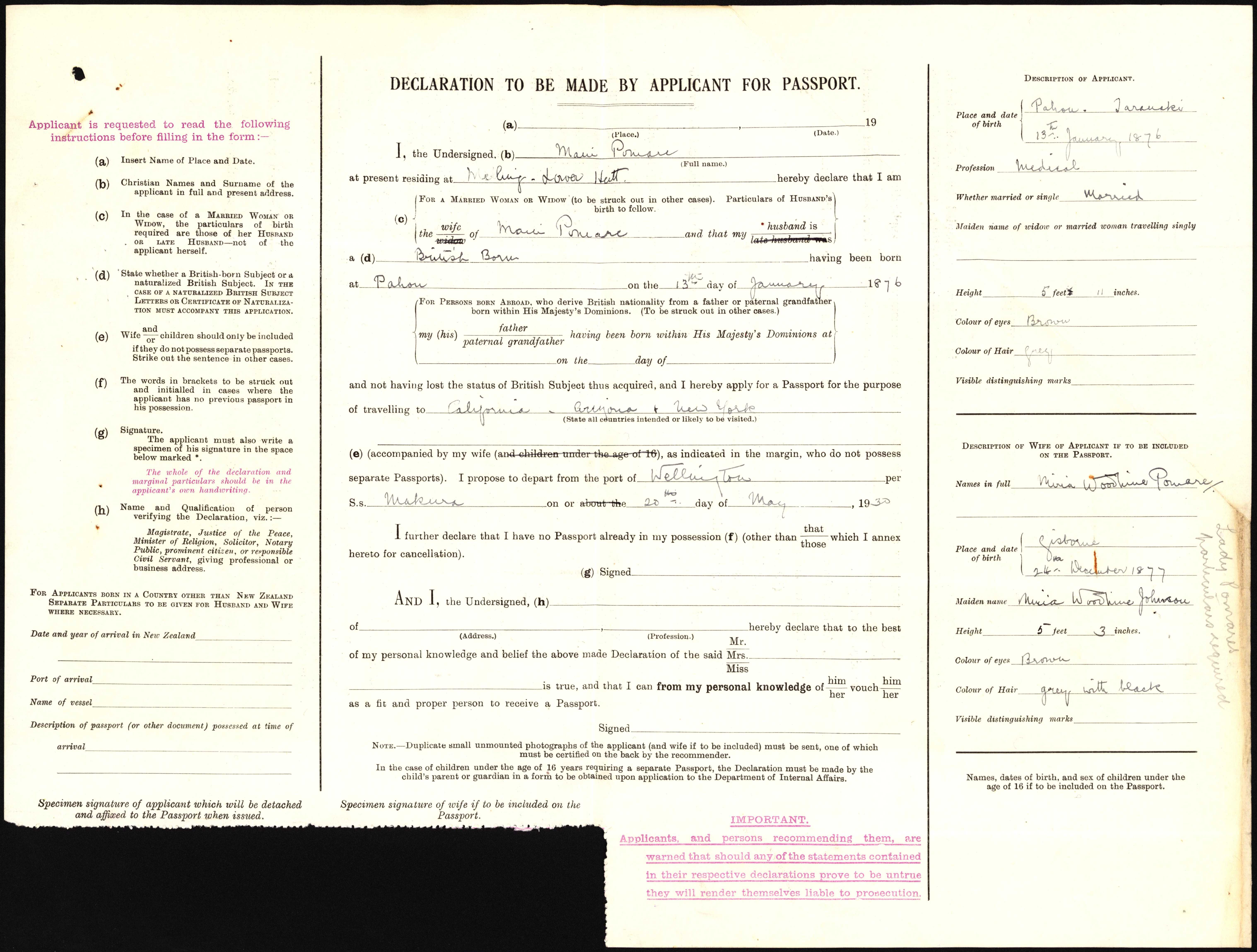
Māui and Miria Pōmare passport application (1930)

In 1928 Pōmare contracted tuberculosis. In the 1928 election Āpirana Ngata conducted Pōmare's campaign on his behalf, despite belonging to the opposition party. Pōmare was re-elected. Later he travelled to California in the hope that the climate would be good for his health. He died on 27 June 1930 in Glendale, California, in Los Angeles County. (Note: The Journal of Polynesian Society incorrectly records his death place as San Francisco.) Pōmare was cremated in San Francisco, which caused much controversy among Māori, as cremation was against protocol and unprecedented.

== Legacy ==
Māui Pōmare day (Te Ra o Māui Pōmare) is celebrated every year at Owae Marae in Waitara, Taranaki, on the Saturday closest to the anniversary of his death. The day recognises his work in health reforms, politics and especially his investigation of Māori land confiscations.

Māui Pōmare day is also of significance to Samoa. In 1927 Pōmare spoke out in Parliament speeches against New Zealand's methods in dealing with Samoa's resistance movement, and this was recognised at the 2013 Māui Pōmare day.

In celebrating 150 years of The New Zealand Herald, the newspaper named him New Zealander of the year for 1926, for his work on Māori land grievances. The Herald gave him the same award again for 1927, for his work as Health Minister that led to fewer deaths of women at childbirth.

== Notes ==
New Zealand Parliament
Preceded by Henare Kaihau	Member of Parliament for Western Maori; 1911–1930	Succeeded by Taite Te Tomo
Political offices
Preceded by James Parr	Minister of Health; 1923–1926	Succeeded by Alexander Young
Preceded by Richard Bollard	Minister of Statistics; 1927–1928	Succeeded by Philip De La Perrelle
Preceded by Richard Bollard	Minister of Internal Affairs; 1927–1928	Succeeded by Philip De La Perrelle
