= Rātana =

New Zealand church and political movement

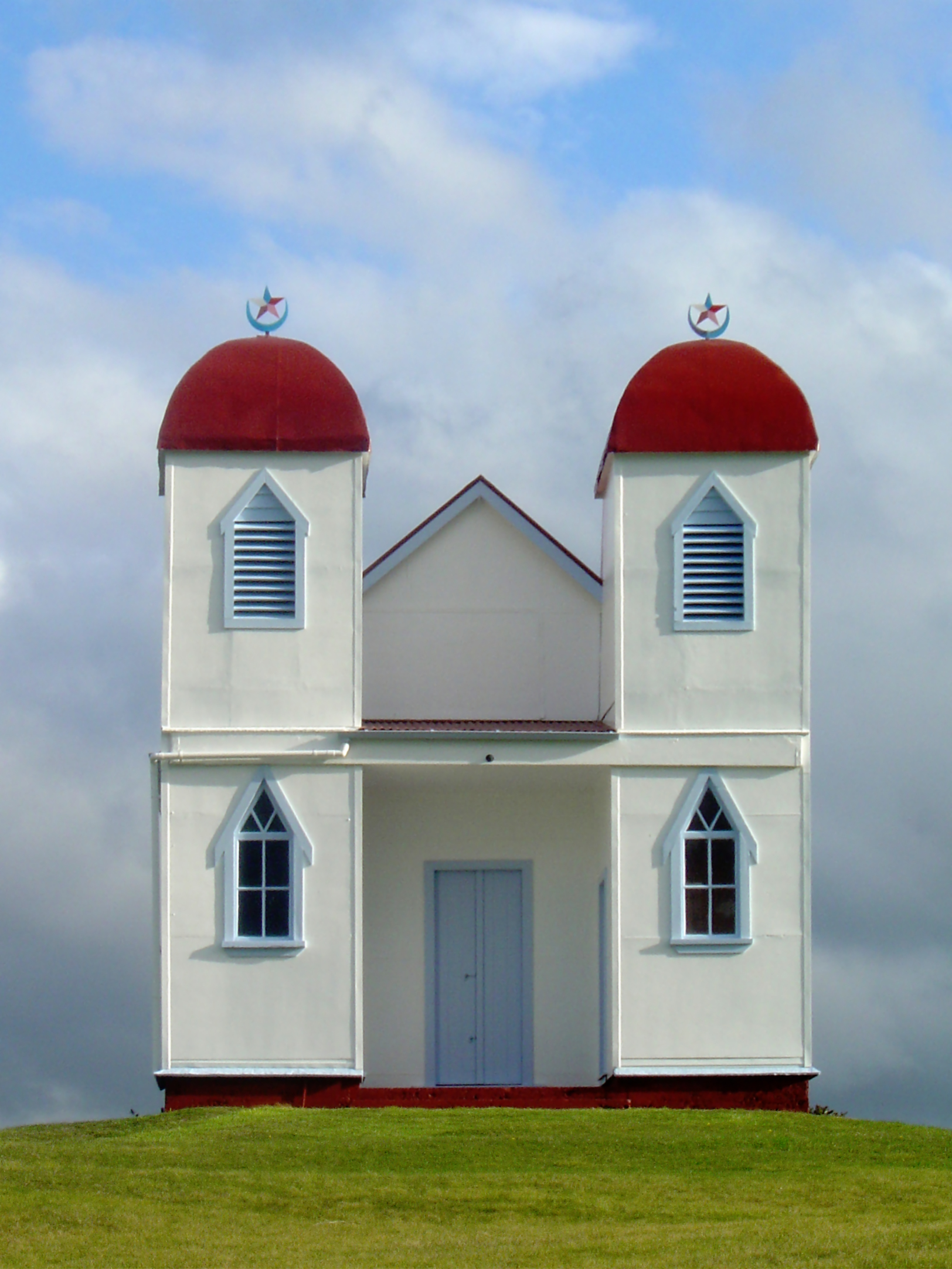
Rātana church near Raetihi

Rātana (Māori: Te Haahi Rātana) is a Māori Christian church and movement, headquartered at Rātana Pā near Whanganui, New Zealand. The Rātana movement began in 1918, when Tahupōtiki Wiremu (T. W.) Ratana claimed to experience visions, and began a mission of faith healing. In 1925 the Ratana Church was formed, and on 25 January 1928—T. W.'s 55th birthday, and "Rātana Day"—the church's iconic temple, Te Temepara Tapu o Ihoa ('the holy temple of Jehovah') was opened. From its beginning and through to the 20th century, the church has pursued political goals, and still welcomes political leaders to the Rātana Pā annually on Ratana's birthday. In the 2018 New Zealand census, 43,821 people identified with the religion.

Initially performing his healing from his family farm, Ratana did not regard his movement as a distinct church, and encouraged his followers to remain with their churches. He received mixed opinions from other Christian leaders, some of whom disliked that he was referred to as the mangai, or the 'mouthpiece' of God, while others were pleased at his renouncement of traditional Māori religion and tohunga.

Ratana and his followers were interested in a political movement alongside a spiritual one, and Ratana was known to talk of the Bible in his right hand, and the Treaty of Waitangi in his left. This political attitude was made clear by 1924, when Ratana led a delegation to Europe to present a petition to King George V on the topic of Māori land confiscations and the treaty. From 1928, and the opening of the church's temple, T. W. had suggested that his own attention would turn away from the church, and his focus would be more fully on politics. This coincided with controversy around Ratana himself, but he was largely unable to extricate himself from the matters of the church, and without a suitable replacement, he remained as the church's leader.

In a 1932 by-election, Rātana had its first candidate, Eruera Tirikatene, elected to parliament for the Southern Maori electorate, and by 1943 had captured all four of the Māori seats—a monopoly it would hold until 1963. By 1931, Rātana had established an alliance with the Labour Party, and Rātana members of parliament consistently backed Labour. In 1936 this alliance was formalised, and Rātana members joined Labour. In the early 2000s, members of other parties began attending Rātana Day, which is now seen as the beginning of New Zealand's political year.

== History ==
T. W. Ratana's grandfather Ngahina was a signatory of the Treaty of Waitangi for the tribes of Ngā Wairiki and Ngāti Apa. Ngahina was a sheep and cattle station owner, Anglican and pro-government loyalist. Rātana's mother was Methodist.

Impacts on Māori in 1918 included land loss, World War I and the Spanish flu epidemic. After the epidemic Rātana was the only surviving male heir of his grandfather. On 8 November 1918 Rātana saw a vision, which he regarded as divinely inspired, asking him to preach the gospel to the Māori people and to cure the spirits and bodies of his people.

Mere Rikiriki had an influence on Rātana and the Rātana movement. Rikiriki taught Rātana and he often consulted her. She had been at Parihaka with Te Whiti o Rongomai and Tohu Kākahi, had established her own church in Parewanui and was a faith healer and rongoā practitioner. Rikiriki foretold the coming of a new prophet in 1912 that she confirmed was Rātana.

Te Urumanao Ngāpaki Baker was a Māori chief and supported the Rātana movement and was Rātana's wife.

=== Ture Wairua (spiritual mission) ===
The church's spiritual laws are itemised as the Trinity (the Father, the Son and the Holy Spirit) as well as adding Ngā Anahera Pono, 'the Holy and Faithful Angels' and Te Māngai (God's Word and Wisdom) to prayers. As well as the Bible, the church relies on their "Blue Book" for church services, which includes hymns and prayers written by T. W. Ratana.

Until 1924 Ratana preached to increasingly large numbers of Māori and established a name for himself as the "Māori Miracle Man". At first, the movement was seen as a Christian revival, but it soon moved away from mainstream churches. On 31 May 1925, Te Haahi Rātana, the Rātana Church, was established, and its founder was acknowledged in the Church's doctrine as the bearer of Te Mangai or God's Word and Wisdom. On 21 July 1925, the constitution of the Rātana Church was accepted by the Registrar-General and a list of "apostles" (ministers) who were authorised to conduct marriages was published in the New Zealand Gazette.

=== Ture Tangata (secular movement) ===
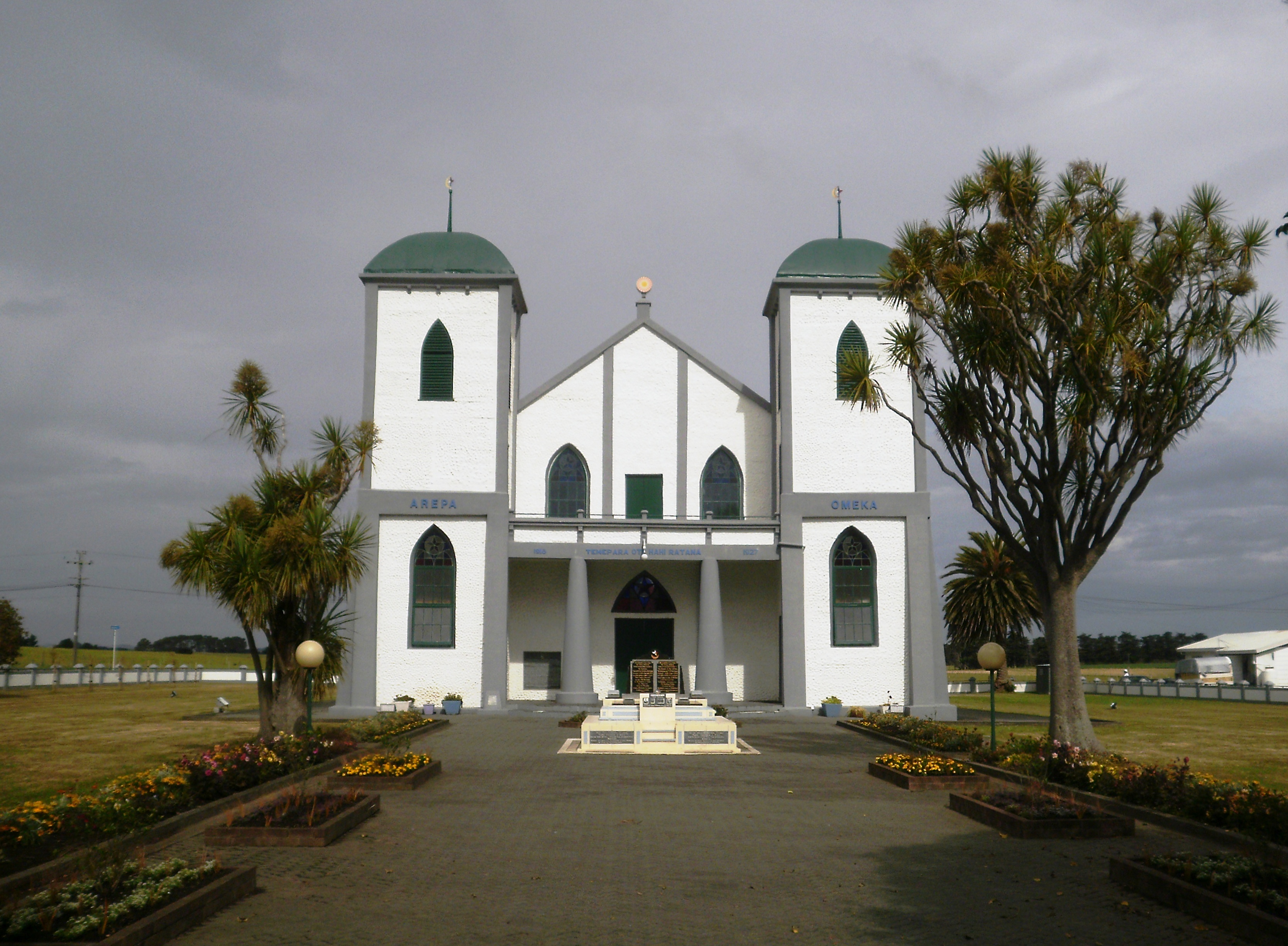
Te Temepara Tapu o Ihoa at Rātana Pā, 2012

In 1924 a group of 38 people including Rātana and his wife Te Urumanao Ngāpaki Baker and spokesperson Pita Moko journeyed to Europe to unsuccessfully present a petition to George V and the League of Nations on land confiscations and the Treaty of Waitangi. Later trips were made to the United States and Canada. These trips were not without controversy. The New Zealand Government acted to prevent the petition being presented to the monarch, and the visit to Japan on the way back from Europe created allegations of disloyalty and of flying the Japanese flag over the church settlement of Rātana Pā.

When the Rātana temple Te Temepara Tapu o Ihoa ('the holy temple of Jehovah') which Rātana saw as embodying in its architecture deep Biblical truths (especially the two magnificent bell towers) was opened on 25 January 1928 by Japanese Bishop Juji Nakada (with whom Ratana and party had stayed in 1924), Ratana declared his spiritual work was complete and church apostles and officers would take on the work. He now turned more to political work for Māori in New Zealand.

=== Koata (political movement) ===
As early as 1923, Rātana had declared an interest in party politics, and his eldest son Haami Tokouru Ratana had stood for the Western Maori electorate as an independent candidate. Now Rātana was determined to capture the Māori electorates to give a voice for his movement.

In January 1928, Rātana called himself Piri Wiri Tua and called on four followers to be the quarters of his body and rule the land. The "first cut" was Paraire Karaka Paikea in the north, Haami Tokouru Ratana in the west, Pita Moko in the east, and Eruera Tirikatene in the south. Moko was later replaced by Tiaki Omana, in the "second cut". The covenant signed by the men promised they would not rest, and their wives separately agreed that they would go barefoot and in rags to represent the Rātana movement. All four went on to capture the Maori seats between 1932 and 1943.

Rātana candidates stood in the 1928 and 1931 general elections and in the 1930 by-election in Western Maori following the death of Māui Pomare, but they did not succeed. The first Rātana movement MP was Eruera Tirikatene, elected in a by-election for Southern Maori in June 1932. He was followed by Haami Tokouru Ratana (known as Toko) in Western Maori in the 1935 general election. In the 1938 election, the third Māori electorate of Northern Maori was captured by Paraire Karaka Paikea, and the last (Eastern Maori) was won by Tiaki Omana in the 1943 election.

The Rātana Independent Members of Parliament were the first to represent a political party in which most party members were Māori. Major aims of the movement were statutory recognition of the Treaty of Waitangi, righting the confiscation grievances of the Māori people, and equality in social welfare for Māori.

Politicians usually attend the Rātana marae to take part in celebrations marking T.W. Ratana's birthday and in January 2023 it was the 150th anniversary. The political party leaders who attended on this occasion were Labour, National, Māori Party, New Zealand First and one co-leader of Greens. Commentator Merepeka Raukawa-Tait stated the message from Māori speakers to the politicians were: "They want to have relationships that are more than transactional and they are not interested in politics and politicians that stir up fear."

==== Alliance with the Labour Party ====
Following the formation of the First Labour Government in 1935, the two Rātana MPs agreed to vote with Labour. This alliance was formalised with the Rātana movement joining the Labour Party in a meeting between Rātana and Prime Minister Michael Savage on 22 April 1936. The Prime Minister was given four symbolic gifts: a potato, a broken gold watch, a pounamu hei-tiki, and a huia feather. The potato represented loss of Māori land and means of sustenance, the broken watch represented the broken promises of the Treaty of Waitangi, and the pounamu represented the mana of the Māori people. If Savage could restore these three, he would earn the right to wear the huia feather to signify his chiefly status. The gifts were regarded as so precious they were buried with Savage at his state funeral in 1940.

The four Māori electorates were held by Rātana-affiliated members of Labour for decades: until 1963 for the Eastern Maori electorate, 1980 for Northern Maori, and 1996 for Western and Southern Maori electorates. Not all Labour Party Māori MPs have been members of the Rātana Church, but all Māori electorates were held by Labour MPs who had at least been endorsed by the church until Tau Henare won Northern Maori in the 1993 New Zealand general election. In both the parliaments of 1946–1948 and 1957–1960, the formation of a Labour Government depended on the votes of the Rātana Movement members.

Rātana movement Members of Parliament have included Tāpihana Paraire Paikea, Haami Tokouru Ratana, Matiu Rātana, Iriaka Rātana, Koro Wētere, Paraone Reweti, Matiu Rata, and Whetu Tirikatene-Sullivan. Mita Ririnui, who held the Māori seat of Waiariki from 1999 to 2005 and was a List MP from 2005 to 2011, is a Rātana minister.

== Symbols ==
Rātana Star

The main symbol (tohu) of the church is a five-pointed star and crescent moon, the whetū mārama (which means "shining star"), which is worn on the lapels of mōrehu (the scattered remnant, Rātana followers) and at pivotal points on church buildings. The golden or blue crescent moon (symbolising enlightenment) can face different parts of the coloured star: blue represents Te Matua (The Father), white is Te Tama (The Son), red is Te Wairua Tapu (The Holy Spirit), purple is Ngā Anahera Pono (The Faithful Angels) and gold/yellow is Te Māngai (The Mouthpiece (of Jehovah), Ture Wairua), although this colour is sometimes replaced with pink, representing PiriWiriTua (The Campaigner (of Political Matters), Ture Tangata). Te Whetū Mārama represents the kingdom of light or Māramatanga, standing firm against the forces of darkness (mākutu).

== Membership ==
Church adherents are known as mōrehu, the 'remnants'. In the 2001 census, 48,975 New Zealand residents were affiliated with the Rātana church. In the 2018 New Zealand census, 43,821 people identified with the religion.

=== Church leaders ===
- Tahupotiki Wiremu Ratana (1925–1939)
- Haami Tokouru Ratana (1939–1944)
- Matiu Rātana (1944–1950)
- Puhi o Aotea Ratahi (1950–1966)
- Maata "Te Reo" Hura (1966–1991)
- Raniera Te Aohou Ratana (1991–1998)
- Harerangi Meihana (1998–2022)
- Andre Lang Meihana (2023-2024)
- Manuao Te Kohamutunga Tamou (2024-present)

== See also ==
- Ringatū, another Māori Christian denomination, established by Te Kooti in the 19th century
