= T. W. Ratana =

Māori prophet, Rātana religion founder

Tahupōtiki Wiremu Rātana
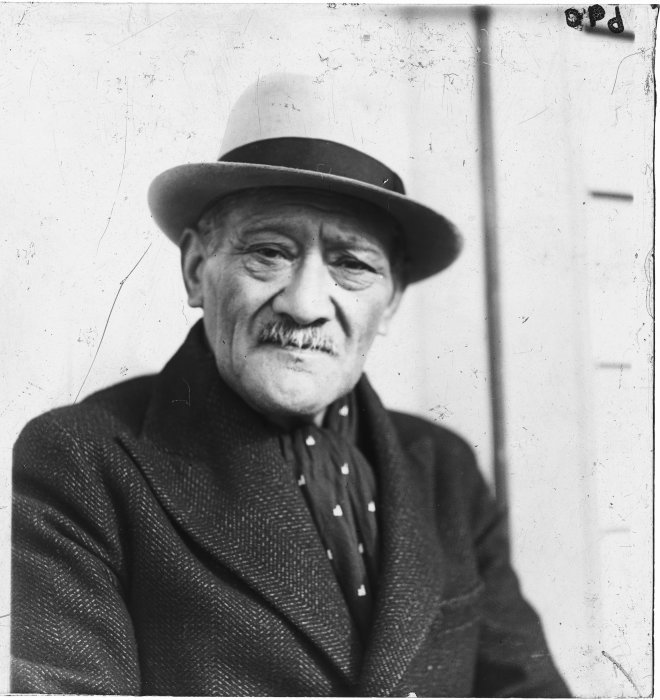
- Born: 25 January 1873? Te Kawau, New Zealand
- Died: 18 September 1939 (aged 66); Rātana Pā, New Zealand
- Occupations: Faith healer, church leader, farmer
- Notable work: The Blue Book (te pukapuka whakamoemiti)

Tahupōtiki Wiremu Rātana (25 January 1873? – 18 September 1939) was the founder of the Rātana religion in the early 20th century in New Zealand. He rose to prominence as a faith healer.

== Beginnings ==
Rātana was of the Ngāti Apa and Ngā Wairiki Māori iwi (tribe). His subtribes were Ngā Ariki, Ngāti Hikapirau, Ngāti Rangiwaho, Ngāti Kiriwheke and Ngati Kauae. On his mother's side he was of Ngā Rauru Kiitahi, his mother belonging to the Rangitaawhi Hapū.

He married Te Urumanao Ngāpaki Baker, who had whakapapa links to the Ngāti Ruanui, and possibly Te Āti Awa also.

Rātana began his spiritual mission during the 1918 influenza epidemic. He claimed that while standing on the veranda of his home at 2pm, on 8 November 1918, three days before the end of the First World War, he saw a small cloud coming in from the sea toward his house. When the cloud 'broke open' he was overwhelmed by a presence and he rushed into the house declaring 'Peace be unto you all, for I am the Holy Spirit that speaks to you all. Straighten yourselves. Repent.' He was told the Holy Spirit was looking for people through whom God could be truly known and accepted. The Māori people had not forgotten Jehovah and so they had been chosen to become an example to the world if only they would turn from their dependence on tohungaism (particularly the manipulative forms of witchcraft) and Māori gods. Rātana was told to unite the Māori and turn them to Ihoa o ngā Mano (Jehovah of the Multitudes).

He continued his study of the Bible and began one of the most powerful faith healing ministries in New Zealand history. He gained a large following among Māori, becoming known as "Mangai" (a mouthpiece of God). A splinter group, called the Christian Maramatanga Society, formed in the mid-1920s when they misinterpreted Rātana's call to 'close the Bible' in order to stop fanciful prophecies.

Variants of his name include Tahupōtiki Wiremu Rātana, Tahu Pōtiki Wiremu Rātana and T. W. Rātana.

== Politics ==
From 1922 onwards the Rātana movement became increasingly occupied with politics. The movement campaigned for ratification of the Treaty of Waitangi as a "cure-all" for Māori problems and collected 30,000 signatures on a petition calling for this. In 1928 Rātana proclaimed that Rātana candidates would win the four Māori electorates in the New Zealand Parliament, likening them to the four parts of his body, or the Four Quarters, as the seats became known. Eruera Tirikatene arranged a meeting with Michael J. Savage in Parliament on 4 February 1936 at which an alliance with the Labour Party was agreed. Savage's predecessor Harry Holland had been reluctant, because of the animosity between Rātana and the Māori King Movement, especially Princess Te Puea. By 1943, the seats had been won, although Rātana had died in 1939.

== Legacy ==
The Rātana Church remains one of the largest churches in Māoridom. The political links with the Labour Party remained strong for over 40 years, but were effectively divided by the rise of the Māori Party, which was founded in 2004 and came to power in a confidence and supply agreement (with the National Party, Labour's traditional rival) after the 2008 election.
