= Taiaroa =

Taiaroa may refer to:

== Places ==
- Taiaroa Head, New Zealand

== People with the surname ==
- Archie Taiaroa (1937–2010), prominent New Zealand Māori
- Dick Taiaroa (c. 1866–1954), New Zealand rugby union player
- Hōri Kerei Taiaroa (c. 1835–1905), New Zealand politician and Māori leader
- John Taiaroa (1862–1907), New Zealand sportsman
- Te Mātenga Taiaroa (c. 1795–1863), New Zealand Māori leader
- Tini Kerei Taiaroa, (1846–1934), New Zealand community worker

== Other ==
- SS Taiaroa, ship name
- HMS Taiaroa, a torpedo boat assigned to the defense of Port Chalmers, New Zealand
- Taiaroa (coral), a genus of corals
