= Parata (surname) =

Parata is a Māori surname. It is a transliteration of the English word "brother" or "brothers".

Notable people with the surname Parata include:

- Campbell Parata, rugby union player
- Dean Parata, Italy international rugby league footballer
- Gail Parata (born 1967), netball coach and player
- Heke Parata, pseudonym of artist Shona Moller
- Hekia Parata, politician
- Katherine Te Rongokahira Parata, tribal leader
- Ned Parata, New Zealand rugby union administrator
- Reihana Parata, weaver
- Rory Parata, Australian-born Irish rugby union player
- Selwyn Parata, Māori leader
- Taare Parata, politician
- Tame Parata, politician
- Wiremu Parata, politician

== See also ==
- Ari Parata, a fictional character in the soap opera Home and Away
- Wi Parata v. the Bishop of Wellington, New Zealand legal precedent
