= Kerei (disambiguation) =

The Kerei were a Kazakh tribe, originating in the Altay region.

Kerei may also refer to:

== People ==
Kerei is a surname. In the Māori language, it is a transliteration of the surname Grey. Notable people with the name include:

- Jäñgir-Kerei Khan (1801–1845), Khan of the Bukey Horde from 1823 to 1845
- Kerei Khan (1424–1473 or 1474), Khan of the Kazakh Khanate from c. 1465 to 1473
- Wiremu Kerei Nikora (1853–1915), New Zealand politician
- Hōri Kerei Taiaroa (died 1905), New Zealand politician
- Tini Kerei Taiaroa (died 1934), wife of Hōri Kerei Taiaroa
- Teoti Kerei Te Hioirangi Te Whāiti (1890–1964), New Zealand tribal leader

== Other uses ==
- Kerei language, Austronesian language spoken in Maluku, Indonesia
