= Dick Taiaroa =

New Zealand rugby player (1866–1954)

Dick Taiaroa OBE
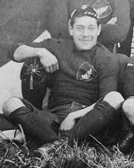
- Born: Riki Te Mairiki Taiaroa c.1866 Otakou, New Zealand
- Died: 9 April 1954 (Note: Sources differ on Tairoa's date of death. Some say 1 July, others 9 April.) Taumutu, New Zealand
- School: Christchurch Boys' High School
- Notable relative(s): Hōri Kerei Taiaroa (father); Tini Kerei Taiaroa (mother); Te Matenga Taiaroa (grandfather); John Taiaroa (brother); Thomas Ellison (cousin)
- Occupation(s): Surveyor, farmer, soldier

Rugby union career
- Position: Forward
Amateur team(s)
Years	Team	Apps	(Points)
- Wellington FC
–	Athletic (Wellington)		
Provincial / State sides
Years	Team	Apps	(Points)
1886–87	Wellington	2	
1889	Hawke's Bay	1	
International career
Years	Team	Apps	(Points)
1888–89	New Zealand Native team	85	(10)

Riki Te Mairiki "Dick" Taiaroa OBE (c.1866 – 9 April 1954) was a New Zealand rugby union footballer who was a member of the 1888–89 New Zealand Native football team that toured New Zealand, the British Isles, and Australia. The tour was the longest in rugby history—the team played 107 matches on tour—and Taiaroa played at least 59 matches in the British Isles and 85 in total. (Note: The exact team lineups for every match is unknown, so this is a minimum number.) This was second in number only to William Elliot who played 86 matches total. Taiaroa also played provincial rugby for Wellington in 1886 and 1887, and Hawke's Bay in 1889. Outside of rugby, he was a surveyor and then farmer. He also served with the New Zealand Contingent of Mounted Rifles during the Anglo-Boer War. Taiaroa was from a prominent Māori family, and was a representative at the coronation of Edward VII and George V. In the 1949 King's Birthday Honours he was appointed an Officer of the Order of the British Empire for services to the Māori people.

== Works cited ==
- Ryan, Greg (1993). Forerunners of the All Blacks. Christchurch, New Zealand: Canterbury University Press. ISBN 0-908812-30-2.
