= Katherine Te Rongokahira Parata =

Ngati Pukenga and Ngati Pikiao woman of mana

- Born: Katherine Asher; 1873; Tauranga, Bay of Plenty, New Zealand
- Died: 1939 (aged 65–66)
- Spouse: Taare Parata (m. 1896)
- Relatives: Albert Asher (brother); Ernie Asher (brother); Tame Parata (father-in-law); Ned Parata (brother-in-law)

Katherine Te Rongokahira Parata (1873–1939) was a New Zealand woman of mana. Of Māori descent, she identified with the Ngāti Pikiao, Ngāti Pūkenga and Te Arawa iwi. She was born in Tauranga, Bay of Plenty, New Zealand in 1873. Two of her brothers, Albert and Ernie Asher, played professional rugby league, and another brother John became a Ngati Pukenga and Ngati Pikiao leader. In 1896, she married Taare Parata. Her husband would later be elected as the representative of the Southern Maori electorate; at the time of their wedding, her father-in-law, Tame Parata, was the electorate's current representative. Ned Parata, a rugby union administrator, was her brother-in-law.
