= 1922 Southern Maori by-election =

New Zealand by-election

- 25 January 1922
MP before election
John Uru
Independent
Elected MP
Henare Uru
Reform

The Southern Maori by-election of 1922 was a by-election during the 20th New Zealand Parliament. It was held on 25 January 1922, i.e. before the 1922 general election, which was held on 7 December.

The seat of Southern Maori became vacant following the death of the sitting member John Hopere Wharewiti Uru on 29 November 1921.

Four candidates contested the seat, which was won by the younger brother of the deceased member, Henry Whakatau Uru, known as Harry. He was a native agent, 49 years old, and born in Kaiapoi.

According to the local Christchurch newspaper, The Press of Thursday, 26 January 1922 (page 6), the new member was a supporter of the Reform government led by William Massey, not an independent as it had stated the day before, when Teone Erihana was described as a 'Government' candidate and all the others as 'Independent'.

The election result given by The Press was two votes higher than the official result published in the New Zealand Gazette of 9 February (page 440) i.e. 814 not 812, with Uru as 365 not 364 and Pitama as 109 not 108. Although electoral rolls of eligible voters were not published for Maori seats, The Press said that proportion voting was higher than in European seats, as the number on the roll was just over 1000.

== Results ==
The following table gives the election results:

1922 Southern Maori by-election
Party	Candidate	Votes	%	±%
Reform	Henare Uru	364	44.83	
Independent	Teone Matapura Erihana	250	30.79	+16.69
Independent	Weretā Tainui Pītama	108	13.30	
Independent	Bill Barrett	90	11.08	
Turnout		812		
Majority		114	14.04	−16.05
