= Thomas Ellison =

New Zealand rugby union player (c. 1867–1904)

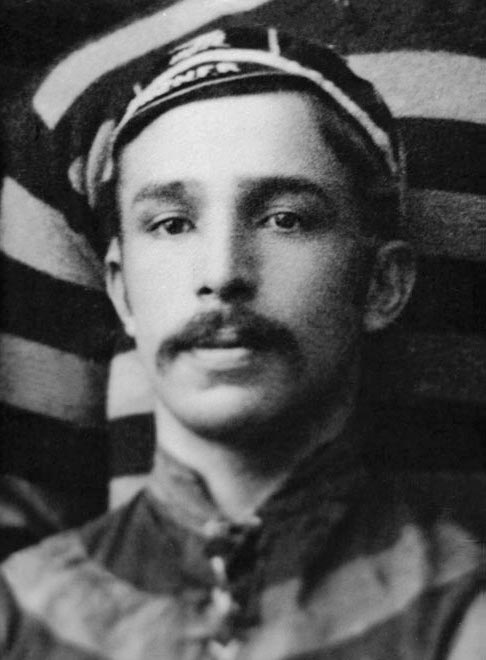
- Born: 11 November 1867 Ōtākou, New Zealand
- Died: 2 October 1904 (aged 36) Porirua, New Zealand
- Weight: 86 kg (190 lb)
- School: Te Aute College
- Notable relatives: Edward Pohau Ellison (brother); Raniera Ellison (nephew); John Howell (father-in-law); Edward Weller (grandfather); Te Matenga Taiaroa (great-grandfather); Riki Ellison (grandnephew); Rhett Ellison (great-grandnephew)
- Occupation: Lawyer

Rugby union career
- Position(s): Forward and half-back
Amateur team(s)
Years	Team	Apps	(Points)
1885–93	Poneke Football Club		
Provincial / State sides
Years	Team	Apps	(Points)
1885–92	Wellington	23	
International career
Years	Team	Apps	(Points)
1888–89	New Zealand Natives	83	(113)
1893	New Zealand	7	(23)

Thomas Rangiwahia Ellison (11 November 1867 – 2 October 1904), also known as Tamati Erihana, was a New Zealand rugby union player and lawyer. He led the first New Zealand representative rugby team organised by the New Zealand Rugby Football Union (NZRFU) on their 1893 tour of Australia. Ellison also played in the 1888–89 New Zealand Native football team on their epic 107-match tour, scoring 113 points, and 43 tries with the side.

Born in Ōtākou, Otago Heads, Ellison was educated at Te Aute College, where he was introduced to rugby. After moving to Wellington, Ellison played for the Poneke Football Club, and was selected to play for Wellington province. He was recruited into Joe Warbrick's privately organised Native football team in 1888, and continued to play for both Poneke and Wellington on his return from that tour. In 1892, he started to refine and popularise the wing-forward system of play, which was a vital element of New Zealand rugby's success until 1932. At the first NZRFU annual general meeting in 1893, he proposed that the playing colours of the New Zealand side should be predominantly black with a silver fern—a playing strip that would give the team their famous name of All Blacks. He retired from playing rugby after captaining the 1893 New Zealand side to New South Wales and Queensland, but continued in the sport as a coach and administrator. Ellison was the author of a coaching manual, The Art of Rugby Football, published in 1902.

As well as being one of the first Māori admitted to the bar, practising as a solicitor, and later as a barrister, Ellison also stood unsuccessfully for the Southern Maori parliamentary seat several times. After contracting tuberculosis in 1904, he was briefly institutionalised before dying later that year.

== Early life ==
Thomas Rangiwahia Ellison was born in Ōtākou at Otago Heads, to Raniera Taheke Ellison and Nani Weller, the 11 November 1867. He was named after his paternal grandfather, and his middle name, Rangiwahia, was given in honour of his great-uncle. Ellison was Māori: of Ngāi Tahu and Kāti Māmoe tribal heritage through his mother, and of Te Āti Awa heritage through his father. Introduced to rugby at the age of around 14 by his cousins at Ōtākou, Ellison later wrote of his first game:

... we were all there for a game, and immediately started on that poor, unprotected ball (which, by the way, consisted of the bladder only). What our main object was I cannot say, but mine was to see more of that ball, and to know more about football, and, before the game was over, which did not last long, I did see more of the ball, as I ripped it in the first scrum; but my other object remained unsatisfied.

After completing his education at Ōtākou Native School, Ellison was awarded a scholarship in 1882 to attend the famous Māori secondary school Te Aute College in the Hawke's Bay. He started playing organised rugby there, and during his final two years played in the school team that won the Hawke's Bay senior club championship. Later in life Ellison claimed that at Te Aute he learned, "nearly all I ever knew of forward play".

After moving to Wellington, Ellison joined the Poneke Football Club in 1885. The Poneke team played junior club rugby at the time, but were promoted to the senior competition after winning all their matches that year. Following their promotion the side won the Wellington club championship each year from 1886 to 1889. Ellison was selected to play for the Wellington provincial team in 1885, and continued to be selected for Wellington until 1892. He eventually earned 23 caps—a large number for the time. Initially Ellison played as a forward or on the wing, but later played half-back.

== New Zealand Native football team ==
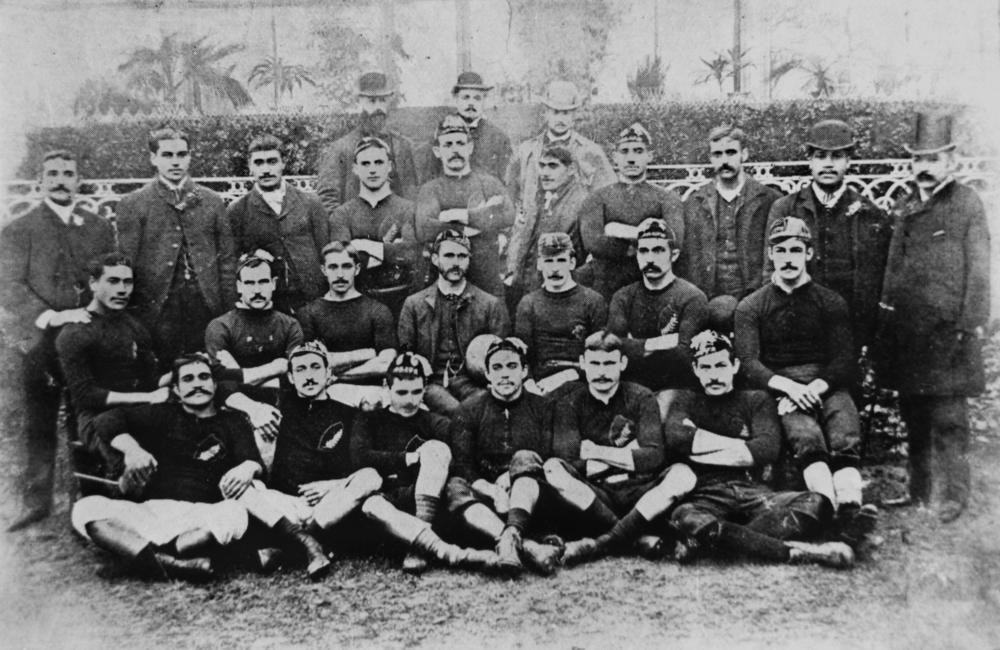
A team photo of the 1888–89 New Zealand Native football team while in England prior to a match against Middlesex. Thomas Ellison is seated in the row second from front, third from left.

In early 1888 Joe Warbrick attempted to organise a private party of Māori players to tour Great Britain—later known as the New Zealand Native football team. A cousin of Ellison's, Jack Taiaroa, who had toured with the New Zealand team that travelled to New South Wales in 1884, helped Warbrick recruit players for his proposed tour. It was most likely because of Taiaroa that Ellison was persuaded to join Warbrick's Natives team. Warbrick eventually assembled a side that included both Māori and non-Māori New Zealand-born players, and several players born overseas. (Note: The original intention was that the team consist of only Māori players, however Warbrick was forced to include several non-Māori in order to strengthen the side.) The final team consisted of 26 players, and toured New Zealand before departing to Melbourne. They then toured Great Britain, Australia, and finally New Zealand again—the trip lasted 14 months. Ellison played mostly as a forward throughout the tour, and played at least 83 of the team's 107 matches; including a minimum of 58 in Britain. (Note: The team lists for eleven of the matches on tour are either incomplete or non-existent. Therefore, the figure of 83 appearances in total, and 58 in Britain, is only a minimum value.)

Ellison played all of the Natives' three internationals—against Ireland, Wales, and England. The Ireland match was the first international of the tour, two months after their arrival in the British Isles. The fixture was played at Lansdowne Road, Dublin, on 1 December 1888, with Ellison in the forwards. Ireland led 3–0 at half-time, but the Natives improved considerably in the second-half, scoring four tries. The third try scored was by Ellison after a counter-attack by George Williams. The try was not converted, but the strong finish from the New Zealanders gave the team a 13–4 victory. The Irish press were surprised by the loss and strongly criticised their team, but Ireland went on to defeat Wales later that season. (Note: Ireland defeated Wales by two tries to nil in the 1889 Home Nations Championship.) The match against Wales was later that month, 22 December, in Swansea. Again Ellison played in the forwards, and the Natives dominated for significant periods of the match. Ellison made several strong runs, and at one point crossed the try-line only to be carried back into play. They failed to score, however, and Wales were victorious 5–0 (one conversion and two tries to nil).

One of the most notable events of the Natives' tour occurred during the match against England at Blackheath. Owing to a dispute over the formation of the International Rugby Football Board, England had not played an international in nearly two years. (Note: This stemmed from a disagreement with Scotland over a try scored during their 1884 match. The other Home Nations refused to play against England until they joined the International Board. Eventually England relented after arbitration by the president of the Football Association in 1890.) This contributed to at least twelve of their team lacking international experience—however many of their players were from strong club and county sides. The match was notable for a dispute between the New Zealanders and the match referee—Rowland Hill. Early in the second half Ellison attempted to tackle the English player Andrew Stoddart, and in the process managed to rip his shorts off. The Natives' players promptly formed a circle around Stoddart to allow him to replace his clothing without being exposed to the gazes of the crowd. While this was happening one of the English players, Frank Evershed, picked up the ball and scored a try. The New Zealanders protested, believing that play had stopped after claiming Stoddart had called "dead ball". Hill awarded the try however, causing several of the Native players to leave the field in protest. The aggrieved players were eventually persuaded to return, but not before Hill had restarted play. Ellison was very critical of Hill; particularly because Hill was also Secretary of England's Rugby Football Union. Writing after the tour, Ellison said of the incident: "gross as these errors were, they were insignificant when compared with another that Mr Hill committed at the outset of the game, viz, refereeing at all in that game".

The team was generally very well received outside London, and especially in north, where rugby was dominated by the working-class. Reaction to the team in the south, where the public school establishment controlled the game, was less positive, and the sportsmanship of the team was criticised. Despite this, Ellison clearly enjoyed the experience of touring with the team, and in 1902 he wrote—"I shall never forget the trip, notwithstanding the extremely heavy programme of fixtures we had to go through. Perhaps the most delightful part of our experiences was tasted not so much on the field of play as off it".

Thomas Eyton, one of the promoters of the tour, said of Ellison's contribution—"His knowledge of the finer points of the game, his weight, strength and activity rendered his services invaluable." Ellison participated in most of the Natives' matches, scoring 113 points, and 43 tries on tour; this included 23 tries in Britain and Ireland, four in New South Wales, five in Queensland, and ten in New Zealand.

== Wing-forward ==
The 2–3–2 scrum formation with wing-forward (in blue) that was popularised by Ellison, and the 3–2–3 scrum formation common in the early 20th century (in red).

After completion of the tour, Ellison continued to play for Poneke and Wellington. While playing with his club, Ellison implemented the use of a wing-forward and seven-man scrum positional system. (Note: The seven–man scrum consisted of two front-rowers (hookers), three second-rowers, and two back-rowers—known as the 2–3–2 system. This is compared to the modern 3–4–1 system.) It is not known exactly who invented the position of wing-forward, but Ellison claimed in The Art of Rugby Football that he had developed it; historian Greg Ryan claims the position was developed in northern England, and that Ellison only refined it after discovering it during the Natives' tour. The distinctive feature of wing-forward play was their role of feeding the ball into the scrum, and subsequently holding onto one of the hookers while the ball progressed through the scrum to the half-back. (Note: Under this scrum configuration there were no props, but instead two hookers.) With the wing-forward bound to the side of the scrum, the opposing half-back would then have to manoeuvre past them to tackle the player with the ball; this would increase the amount of time the half-back would have in possession of the ball before their opposite could tackle them. Ellison claimed that he devised the position while playing for Poneke after he "found it impossible for the smartest of referees to detect and amply penalize off-side interferences of opponents bent on spoiling my passes".

Regardless of the origins of the position, Ellison was instrumental in promoting its adoption throughout New Zealand. Although it is unclear whether the wing-forward was used during the 1893 tour of Australia, by the time of the All Blacks' first test match, played during their 1903 Australian tour, the position was engrained within the New Zealand style of play. The use of a wing-forward provoked controversy both in New Zealand, and later in the British Isles after the All Blacks toured there in 1905; wing-forwards were often accused of off-side obstruction of the opposition half-back. According to Ellison however, if the position was implemented properly, then there would be no cause for complaint. The wing-forward continued as a vital component of New Zealand rugby until long-standing complaints from the unions of the Home Nations resulted in the position being outlawed by the International Rugby Football Board in 1932. (Note: At this time the International Rugby Football Board consisted only of representatives from the English, Irish, Scottish and Welsh unions, and did not have a representative from New Zealand.)

== Later rugby career ==
In 1892, the New Zealand Rugby Football Union (NZRFU—later renamed New Zealand Rugby Union) was formed by the majority of New Zealand's provincial rugby unions. Ellison was a Wellington provincial administrator, and in 1893 at the inaugural NZRFU annual general meeting proposed the playing strip for the first officially sanctioned New Zealand side—black cap, black jersey with white fern, white knickerbockers and black stockings. The white knickerbockers were eventually replaced with black shorts, and the uniform itself was based upon that worn by the Native team Ellison had toured with. The black uniform inspired the moniker All Blacks—a name which has been adopted by the New Zealand national team since their 1905–06 Northern Hemisphere tour. (Note: Another theory is that the name All Blacks came from a printing error of "all backs" during the 1905–06 tour, however this is unlikely. The name probably existed prior to 1905, but the Northern Hemisphere tour did popularise it.)

The first NZRFU sanctioned New Zealand team was formed to tour New South Wales and Queensland in 1893, and Ellison was selected as their captain. Three other members of the New Zealand Natives' team were also selected for the side. Ellison played seven matches on the tour, including matches against New South Wales and Queensland. The team won ten of their eleven matches—the one loss being to New South Wales in Sydney. In addition to scoring two tries, Ellison kicked six conversions and a goal from a mark to give him 23 points for the tour—the second highest of any player. The tour was the end of his participation in the sport as a player.

Ellison's complete playing record comprised 117 matches, 68 of which were first-class games. (Note: The definition of a first-class match can vary. First-class status is awarded at the discretion of the NZRU. According to the 2012 NZRU Competitions and Regulations Handbook such status is automatically applied to various fixtures, including: senior national representative matches, provincial competition matches, Ranfurly Shield matches, and fixtures involving tours by visiting national teams, as well as "Such other matches as the NZRU Board may from time to time determine".) He scored a total of 160 career points, including 51 tries. Ellison continued involvement with rugby as a provincial administrator, provincial referee, and manager. As an administrator, he proposed that players be financially compensated for wages missed while on long tours; this was in 1898—nearly a century before rugby relinquished its amateur status. (Note: In 1995, the International Rugby Board changed their laws to allow professionalism.) This proposal applied specifically to tours that travelled outside New Zealand; writing at the time regarding the amateur regulations, Ellison said "I think that these laws were never intended to apply to extended tours abroad." In 1902 he published The Art of Rugby Football, a coaching manual on rugby that also included accounts of his experiences as a player. According to journalist Hayden Meikle the book was one of rugby's "pioneering texts", while Greg Ryan wrote that the book "remains a classic work on early rugby strategy."

== Professional and personal life ==
Outside of his involvement in rugby, Ellison was a lawyer, and was one of the first Māori admitted to the bar. He practised as an interpreter for the Land Courts and as a solicitor; later, he worked as a barrister in the practices of Brandon & Hislop in Wellington. Ellison was also involved in politics, and stood unsuccessfully for the Southern Maori parliamentary seat several times against Tame Parata, as well as working for government consideration of Ngāi Tahu land claims. He married Ethel May Howell, a daughter of John Howell, on 22 March 1899; the couple had three children, only one of whom survived infancy, daughter Hinemura who died in 1989. In 1904 Ellison was struck down with tuberculosis, and was admitted to Porirua Lunatic Asylum before dying on 2 October that same year. (Note: It was common for tuberculosis sufferers to be treated in mental asylums at this time.) Ellison was buried in Ōtākou, Otago Heads, following the original plan of a burial at Karori. Representatives of Ellison's parents intercepted the body in Porirua, and his wife and Public Trustee then agreed for him to be buried at Ōtākou. There his gravestone reads "One of the greatest rugby footballers New Zealand ever possessed".

Ellison's influence on New Zealand rugby is such that Māori researcher Malcolm Mulholland stated he was "arguably the player who contributed the most to New Zealand rugby". In 1916, when discussing the question of the greatest player New Zealand had produced, the pseudonymous "Touchline" wrote: (Note: Although pseudonymous, "Touchline" claimed to have "an intimate acquaintance with the playing of Rugby in New Zealand", and to have "been through the whole gamut—as player, referee, secretary of Rugby Unions, manager of travelling teams, and football critic".) "I am prepared to say that the late T. R. Ellison... was the greatest of them all." He went on to say:

When occasion demanded, T R. Ellison could take a place among the backs—half or three-quarter—and was a fine coach. He could not only plan out great, deep, wily, and pretty schemes, but personally carry them through to triumphant execution. He could take his place in the front of a scrummage, and hook the ball with the best of them; his tremendous strength enabled him to burst through a pack, and then, when he was clear of the wreckage, and was well in the open, he was a perfect demon.

Ellison has been inducted into the Māori Sports Hall of Fame, and in 2005 was listed as one of New Zealand's Top 100 History Makers. The New Zealand Native Football team was inducted into the World Rugby Hall of Fame (then the International Rugby Board Hall of Fame) in 2008, the first side awarded the honour.

== See also ==
- List of 1888–89 New Zealand Native football team matches

== Sources ==
=== Books and articles ===
- Competition Regulations Handbook (PDF). New Zealand Rugby Union. 2012. Archived from the original (PDF) on 8 April 2013.
- Elliott, Matt (2012). Dave Gallaher—The Original All Black Captain. Auckland, New Zealand: HarperCollinsPublishers. ISBN 978-1-86950-968-2.
- McIlraith, Matt (2005). Ten Years of Super 12. Auckland, New Zealand: Hachette Livre NZ. ISBN 1-86971-025-8.
- McLean, Terry (1987). New Zealand Rugby Legends. Auckland, New Zealand: MOA Publications. ISBN 0-908570-15-5.
- Mulholland, Malcolm (2009). Beneath the Māori Moon—An Illustrated History of Māori Rugby. Wellington, New Zealand: Huia Publishers. ISBN 978-1-86969-305-3.
- Romanos, Joseph (2005). New Zealand's Top 100 History Makers. Wellington, NZ: Trio. ISBN 0958245568.
- Ryan, Greg (1993). Forerunners of the All Blacks. Christchurch, New Zealand: Canterbury University Press. ISBN 0-908812-30-2.
- Ryan, Greg (2011). "A Tale of Two Dinners: New Zealand Rugby and the Embrace of Empire, 1919–32". The International Journal of the History of Sport. 28 (10). Routledge: 1409–1425. doi:10.1080/09523367.2011.577641. S2CID 144270919.

=== News ===
- "Death of Tom Ellison". Otago Witness. 5 October 1904. p. 56.
- Meikle, Hayden (3 October 2011). "Greatest moments in Otago sport—Number 36". Otago Daily Times.
- "The New Zealand Football Team —Details of Matches and Tour". Auckland Star. 23 January 1889. p. 5.
- "The New Zealand Footballers". Te Aroha News. 9 February 1889. p. 6.
- Touchline (28 July 1916). "The Greatest Player". The New Zealand Free Lance. Wellington.
- "Truth behind All Blacks myth". Sunday News. 28 June 2008.

=== Web ===
- "2008 Inductee: J Warbrick & 1888 Natives Team". irb.com. 23 November 2008. Archived from the original on 14 April 2013.
- "All Blacks' 'non-try' hands Wales historic win". Ministry for Culture and Heritage. 20 December 2012.
- "All Blacks—The Name?". New Zealand Rugby Museum. Archived from the original on 14 October 2008.
- Anderson, Atholl. "Ellison, Thomas Rangiwāhia". Dictionary of New Zealand Biography. Ministry for Culture and Heritage.
- "in New South Wales and Queensland". stats.allblacks.com.
- Luxford, Bob. "Thomas Rangiwahia Ellison". New Zealand Rugby Museum.
- "New Zealand Natives tour—Swansea, 22 December 1888: Wales 1G – 0G New Zealand Natives". espnscrum.com.
- "Wales v Ireland at Swansea, Mar 2, 1889". espnscrum.com.
- "Wellington club rugby championship winners 1880–2017". Club Rugby.
