= Simon Watson =

Simon Watson may refer to:

- Simon Watson (ice hockey) (born 1980), Canadian ice hockey player
- Simon Watson (photographer), Irish photographer
- Simon Watson (rower) (born 1987), New Zealand rower
