= John Broughton (dentist) =

New Zealand academic, dentist and playwright (1947-2026)

John Broughton CNZM ED JP
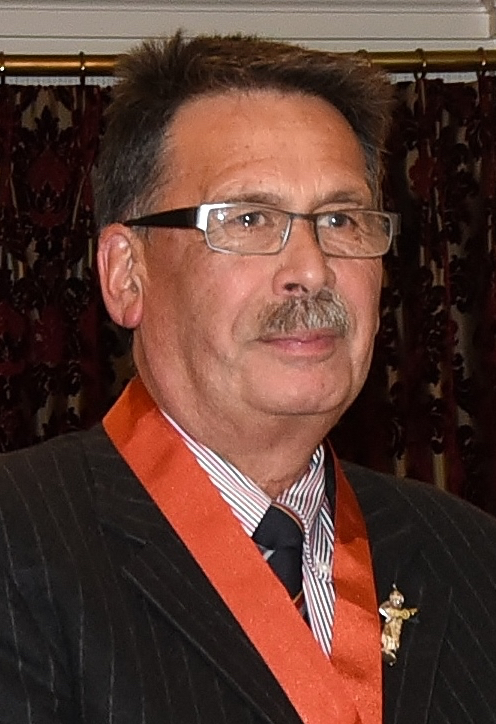
- Broughton in 2016
- Born: John Renata Broughton; 19 March 1947; Hastings, New Zealand
- Died: 15 September 2026 (aged 79); Dunedin, New Zealand
- Education: Massey University; University of Otago
- Occupations: Academic; playwright
- Scientific career
- Fields: Dentistry; Māori health; preventive and social medicine
- Workplaces: University of Otago
- Thesis: Oranga niho: a review of Māori oral health service provision utilising a kaupapa Māori methodology (2006)
- Relatives: Tame Parata (great-grandfather); Ned Parata (great-uncle); Taare Parata (great-uncle)

John Renata Broughton (19 March 1947 – 15 September 2026) was a New Zealand academic and playwright. From 2012 he was a full professor at the University of Otago.

== Background ==
Broughton was born in Hastings on 19 March 1947, the son of Leonard Broughton, from Ngāti Kahungunu who graduated from the University of Otago in medicine in 1944, and Margaret Evans, who was the granddaughter of Tame Parata. He attended Hastings Boys' High School.

He studied microbiology at Massey University, graduating Bachelor of Science in 1971, after which he worked at Glaxo Laboratories in Palmerston North for two years. From 1972–1973, Broughton worked at the Polynesian Cultural Center on Oahu in Hawaii. He returned to New Zealand in 1974 and studied dentistry at the University of Otago, graduating with a Bachelor of Dental Surgery in 1977. He worked as a dental house surgeon at Dunedin Hospital. He joined the New Zealand Territorial Force, and was commissioned as an officer in 1977; in 1992 he was awarded the Efficiency Decoration.

== Academic career ==
Appointed a lecturer in Māori health at the University of Otago in 1989, Broughton did ground-breaking research on dental health in indigenous children in New Zealand, Australia and Canada. He completed a 2006 PhD titled Oranga niho: a review of Māori oral health service provision utilising a kaupapa Māori methodology at the University of Otago. In 2012, he was appointed a full professor at Otago, jointly in preventive and social medicine and Māori health, within the Department of Oral Diagnostic and Surgical Sciences. He was the associate dean (Māori) of the School of Dentistry at Otago.

Broughton was appointed a Companion of the New Zealand Order of Merit, for services to Māori health, theatre and the community, in the 2016 Queen's Birthday Honours, and was a justice of the peace.

He had many governance roles.

In December 2025, Broughton received an Honorary Doctor of Science from the University of Otago "in recognition of his years of dedication to Māori health services and contribution to teaching and research."

== Playwright career ==
While studying in 1988 at the University of Otago, Broughton joined a playwright course run by Roger Hall. Subsequently, Broughton wrote several plays. His best-known play, Michael James Manaia (1991), was a one-person play about a New Zealand Vietnam veteran, first performed by actor Jim Moriarty and included an international presentation at the Edinburgh Festival. Significant in part because of its central Māori character, the work paved the way for other Māori playwrights. Twenty years after first being performed, it toured New Zealand and Australia in 2012 – performed by Te Kohe Tuhaka, produced by Taki Rua Productions – to critical acclaim.

Broughton received the New Zealand Bruce Mason Playwriting Award in 1990.

=== Plays written ===
Entries show: Title [year written] / [synopsis] / [year first produced] / [venue of premiere]

- Te Hara (The Sin), 1988
- Te Hokina Mai (The Return Home), 1988
- Marae, 1992
- Ka Awatea (The New Dawn), 1994. A libretto for an opera for the National Māori Choir, commissioned by the Aoraki Festival. 1994. A gambling, drinking Buddah who affects his wife and family.
- The Story of Aoraki, 'The Story of Aoraki' was originally a scene within 'Summer Starlight Winter Moon', a multimedia presentation written for shadow puppets. First performed 1997. Aoraki festival, Timaru.
- Michael James Manaia, Downstage Theatre. Trauma caused by a man's upbringing and service during the war in Vietnam. 1991.
- 1981, About the protests of the Springbok rugby tour to New Zealand in 1981.
- ANZAC, Concerning a soldier's return to Dunedin from WWI to New Zealand.
- Frankie and Hone
- Mana is My Name, Musical about unemployment, disability, adoption and drink driving centred around a freezing works closure in New Zealand.
- The Private War of Corporal Cooper

== Death ==
Broughton died in Dunedin on 15 September 2026, at the age of 79.
