= Tui Uru =

New Zealand opera singer

- Born: 20 January 1926; Wellington, New Zealand
- Died: 26 April 2013 (aged 87); Dunedin, New Zealand
- Occupation: Broadcaster
- Known for: First Māori television presenter
- Relatives: Henare Uru (father); Hopere Uru (uncle); Jade Uru (great-nephew); Storm Uru (great-nephew)

Tui Uru (20 January 1926 – 26 April 2013) was a New Zealand opera singer and broadcaster. She was the first Māori television announcer.

== Early life and family ==
Born in Wellington on 20 January 1926, Uru affiliated to the Ngāi Tūāhuriri hapū of Ngāi Tahu. She was the daughter of the Reform Party Member of Parliament for Southern Maori, Henare Whakatau Uru, and his second wife, Gladys Constance Mary Uru (née Rogers), who was Australian from Albury, New South Wales. Uru's father died in 1929 when she was three years old, and she was educated at Ouruhia School and Christchurch Girls' High School. Uru took singing lessons, attaining the award of Licentiate of the Royal Schools of Music. In 1944, her brother, Henare Whakatau "K" Uru, a pilot officer in the Royal New Zealand Air Force, was killed on active service. Tui Uru was the great-aunt of rowers Jade and Storm Uru.

== Career ==
=== Singing ===
From at least 1943, Uru was singing publicly. That year she appeared in a concert at the Civic Theatre in Christchurch, where she gave a solo performance of "Beautiful Isle of Somewhere".

A soprano, Uru travelled to Australia to compete in 15 events at the 1953 City of Sydney Eisteddfod. In all, she won 11 categories, including the section for singing folk songs of any country, and was second in a further two sections. She won the Dulcie Starkey Memorial Trophy for the overall winner of the adult ballad competitions. The judge, Gregory Stroud, described Uru as having "a voice of fine quality" and a "charming personality". She also competed in The Sun aria contest in Ballarat in 1953, finishing fourth equal.

In 1955, Uru went to London, where she studied singing with Roy Henderson and Dawson Freer, and funded her studies by working as a telephonist. She performed in a concert at Wigmore Hall and as a soloist at Westminster Central Hall. In 1964, Uru returned to New Zealand, and was described at that time as a contralto.

=== Broadcasting ===
Uru applied for a job as a radio announcer with the New Zealand Broadcasting Service in 1945, and was appointed to a position in Christchurch in 1950. She covered the 1953–54 royal tour of New Zealand. After her return to New Zealand from London, Uru joined New Zealand Broadcasting's (NZBC) Christchurch television station, CHTV3, as a continuity announcer, becoming the first Māori television presenter in October 1964.

After working briefly in Palmerston North, Uru transferred to Dunedin, where she continued working as a radio presenter on the YA and YC stations, and as a continuity announcer for the local NZBC television station, DNTV2. She later moved to private radio station Radio Otago 4XO.

== Later life and death ==
Uru lived in retirement in Dunedin. She died there on 26 April 2013, and was buried at Dunedin Cemetery.

== See also ==
- List of New Zealand television personalities
