= 1967 Southern Maori by-election =

New Zealand by-election

← 1966 general	11 March 1967	1969 general →
- Turnout: 6,686 (50.47%)
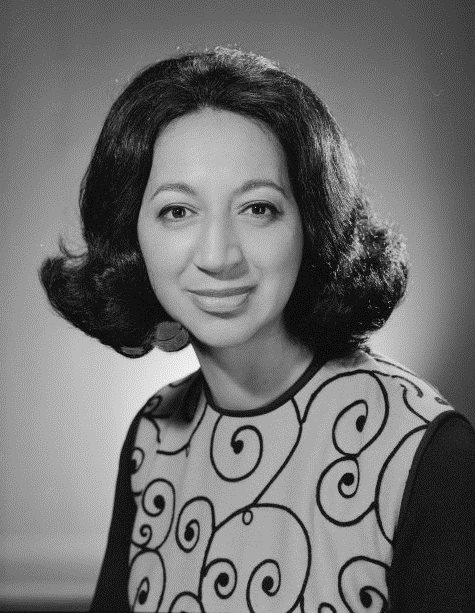

Candidate	Whetu Tirikatene	Baden Pere
Party	Labour	National
Popular vote	4,968	1,371
Percentage	74.31	20.51
MP before election
Sir Eruera Tirikatene
Labour
Elected MP
Whetu Tirikatene
Labour

The Southern Māori by-election of 1967 was a by-election for the electorate of Southern Maori on 11 March 1967 during the 35th New Zealand Parliament. The by-election resulted from the death of the previous member Sir Eruera Tirikatene on 11 January 1967.

The by-election was won by his daughter Whetu Tirikatene (later Whetu Tirikatene-Sullivan), also of the Labour Party.

== Candidates ==
Labour

Tirikatene's son, Te Rino Tirikatene, who had stood unsuccessfully for the Labour Party in the 1963 election and 1966 election for Rangiora, was initially expected to succeed him as MP for Southern Maori. As Te Rino was part-Maori and entitled to choose between being on the Maori and European electoral rolls, at the time of the by-election he was registered on the European roll in Rangiora where he had to remain under the electoral act until the next general election, which made it unlikely he would be eligible as a candidate in Southern Maori. With Te Rino effectively ruled out, attention turned to Tirikatene's daughter Whetu (who was studying in Australia at the time) as the likely Labour candidate for the seat. The Labour Party eventually chose Whetu Tirikatene as its candidate.

National

Flight Lieutenant Mafeking Baden Powell Pere was chosen by the National Party. He was a jet pilot in the Royal New Zealand Air Force based at Wigram Aerodrome. Pere had contested the Southern Maori seat in the previous election.

Social Credit

The Social Credit Party selected James Hugh MacDonald, a lineman from Blenheim as its candidate. He had contested the Southern Maori seat at the 1966 election.

== Results ==
The following table gives the election results:

1967 Southern Maori by-election
Party	Candidate	Votes	%	±%
Labour	Whetu Tirikatene	4,968	74.31	
National	Baden Pere	1,371	20.51	−1.17
Social Credit	James Hugh MacDonald	347	5.18	−0.85
Majority		3,597	53.80	
Turnout		6,686	50.47	−12.21
Registered electors		13,248		

Tirikatene was elected with a huge majority, becoming the youngest woman to have been elected to Parliament to that time. Contrary to normal trends the candidate from the incumbent party increased their vote and majority. Leader of the Opposition Norman Kirk said he was encouraged by the result due to the swing to Labour being consistent across the electorate, which covered the area of 40 general seats, many of which were marginal. It also encompassed the seats of Fendalton and Petone, both of which had pending by-elections.
