= 1932 Southern Maori by-election =

New Zealand by-election

The Southern Maori by-election of 1932 was a by-election during the 24th New Zealand Parliament. The election was held on 3 August 1932.

The seat of Southern Maori became vacant following the death of the sitting member Tuiti Makitanara.

Six candidates contested the seat, which was won by Eruera Tirikatene. This was the first seat ever won by the Ratana party.

== Results ==
The following table gives the election results:

1932 Southern Maori by-election
Party	Candidate	Votes	%	±%
Ratana	Eruera Tirikātene	425	44.69	+10.34
United/Reform	William Teihoka Parata	184	19.35	
Independent	Peter McDonald	132	13.88	
Independent	Joseph Beaton (United–Reform Coalition)	113	11.88	
Independent	Tame Bragg (Reform)	94	9.88	
Independent	Wiremu Mihaka	3	0.32	
Majority		241	25.34	+23.27
Turnout		951		

Tirikatene stayed in parliament until his death in 1967. He eventually joined the Labour Party after they merged with Ratana.
