= John Taiaroa =

NZ international rugby union player & cricketer

Jack Taiaroa
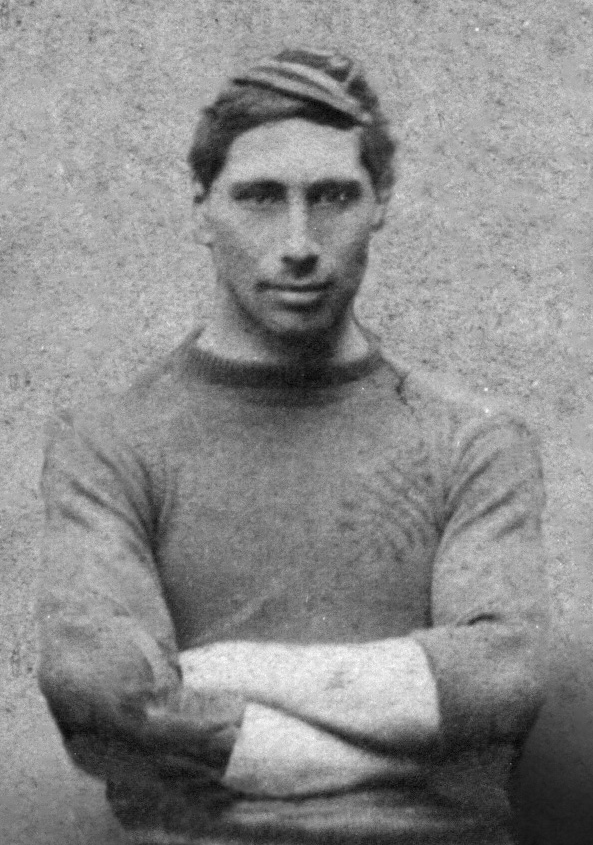
- Born: John Grey Taiaroa; Teone Wiwi Taiaroa; 16 September 1862 Otakou, New Zealand
- Died: 31 December 1907 (aged 45) Otago Harbour, New Zealand
- Height: 1.78 m (5 ft 10 in)
- Weight: 82 kg (181 lb)
- School: Otago Boys' High School
- Notable relative(s): Hōri Kerei Taiaroa (father); Tini Kerei Taiaroa (mother); Te Matenga Taiaroa (grandfather); Dick Taiaroa (brother); Thomas Ellison (cousin)
- Occupation: Lawyer

Rugby union career
- Position: Halfback
Provincial / State sides
Years	Team	Apps	(Points)
1881–84	Otago		
1887–89	Hawke's Bay		
International career
Years	Team	Apps	(Points)
1884	New Zealand	0	(0)
- Cricket career

Cricket information

Domestic team information
- Years: Team
- 1891/92–1898/99: Hawke's Bay
- First-class debut: 9 January 1892 v Taranaki
- Last First-class: 26 December 1898 v Wellington

Career statistics
Competition	First-class
Matches	8
Runs scored	140
Batting average	14.00
100s/50s	0/0
Top score	32*
Balls bowled	89
Wickets	1
Bowling average	43.00
5 wickets in innings	0
10 wickets in match	0
Best bowling	1-9
Catches/stumpings	2/0
- Source: CricketArchive, 22 January 2017

John Grey Taiaroa (16 September 1862 – 31 December 1907), of Ngāi Tahu descent, was a New Zealand rugby union player. A halfback, he played nine matches for New Zealand in 1884—the warm-up in Wellington and all eight matches of the tour of New South Wales; New Zealand won all eight games. There were no test matches on the tour, as Australia did not play their first test match until 1899. Taiaroa was the highest try scorer of the tour.

Born in Otakou, the son of Hōri Kerei Taiaroa, a New Zealand Member of Parliament, Taiaroa played school-boy rugby for Otago Boys' High School and then for the Otago provincial side. He went on to set a national record in the long jump and represent Hawke's Bay in first-class cricket during the 1890s as an attacking batsman.

In 1886 Taiaroa hit the headlines after signing his father's name on a promissory note. Despite a warrant being issued for his arrest, it was not served and the charges were later dropped.

He spent most of his working life as a lawyer in Hastings. He was accidentally drowned in Otago Harbour on 31 December 1907 and his body was recovered at Karitane beach two weeks later.
