= 1918 Southern Maori by-election =

New Zealand by-election

The 1918 Southern Maori by-election was a by-election during the 19th New Zealand Parliament. The election was held on 21 February 1918.

The seat of Southern Maori became vacant following the death of the sitting member Taare Parata on 8 January.

The by-election was won by Hopere Uru.

Uru was Independent, but supported the Reform Party.

Henare Parata was described as the (National) Government nominee, and was a brother of the previous MP Taare Parata.

== Results ==
The following table gives the election results:

1918 Southern Maori by-election
Party	Candidate	Votes	%	±%
Independent	Hopere Uru	242	38.78	
Independent	Henare Parata	223	35.74	
Independent	Teone Matapura Erihana (Ellison)	159	25.48	
Turnout		624		
Majority		19	3.04	
