= Helen Pearse-Otene =

New Zealand playwright, actor and author

- Education: Massey University (PhD)
- Occupations: Playwright; film actor; author
- Partner: Jim Moriarty
- Writing career
- Years active: 1999–present

Helen Pearse-Otene is a New Zealand playwright, actor and author.

== Biography ==
In 1989 Pearse-Otene's partner Jim Moriarty was one of the founders of a theatre company called Te Rākau Hua o te Wao Tapu, which works in prisons, youth residential homes and on marae; Pearse-Otene joined the company in 1999. Te Rākau is New Zealand’s longest-running independent Māori theatre company.

Pearse-Otene's theatre practice has been influenced by Te Rākau's kaupapa Māori, founded on the principles of Te Tiriti o Waitangi and influenced by features of Bertolt Brecht's epic theatre, such as direct address, minimal technology and the aim of social change, also a purpose of Augusto Boal's Theatre of the Oppressed. As both script-writer and workshop facilitator, Pearse-Otene has in-depth experience of applying ensemble movement and chorus to the work of Te Rākau as well as integrating waiata and kapa haka, through "Marae Theatre".

Although the work of Te Rākau uses marae features such as pōwhiri, it is performed in a range of venues: kāinga, schools, prisons, youth justice residential and community centres, as well as mainstream theatres throughout New Zealand. Through ensemble work, the aim is to craft evocative theatre that honours Māori expressions of colonisation, trauma and social justice. The genre includes traditional and contemporary Māori performing arts, applied theatre and therapeutic encounter.

As an actor, Pearse-Otene played Faith in 1981 by John Broughton, a production directed by Toni Waho at Centrepoint Theatre in Palmerston North. The following year Pearse-Otene performed in Duty Free by Ngarupiki Reid, directed by Tanea Heke, which had a fortnight season at BATS Theatre. In 1998 she also performed the role of Ellie in Tricyle, which Pearse-Otene co-wrote with Mark Sant and Anne Nordhaus.

As a playwright, Pearse-Otene aims to present the past, present and future complexity of collective history in New Zealand. The Undertow involves a 180 year journey through six generations of one Wellington-based family in a quartet of plays: The Ragged, Dog & Bone, Public Works and The Landeaters. Pearse-Otene carried out extensive research for the play including settlers’ and Armed Constabulary diaries, newspaper articles, and ngā kupu tuku iho (oral histories) of local iwi. The Undertow was presented at Soundings Theatre at Te Papa as a quartet in 2017. It was filmed by cinematographer Waka Atewell and edited into a four part television series that aired on Māori Television in 2019.

As an academic, Pearse-Otene has published articles theorizing Theatre Marae and decolonization of political theatre, and is currently employed as Professional Practice Advisor to the Postgraduate Diploma Health Psychology Professional Practice in the School of Health, Victoria University of Wellington. She has been a researcher on numerous social justice and decolonization research projects including TIAKI, a project on incarceration and health inequity.

Pearse-Otene is also a novel writer; she has published two graphic novels in a series called Matawehi Fables: Meariki and Arohanui. The novels are published in English and in te reo Māori.

== Personal life ==
Pearse-Otene grew up in South Auckland. She studied at Victoria University of Wellington and Toi Whakaari, and holds a master's degree and a PhD from Massey University. She is a registered psychologist. She is affiliated to Ngāti Rongomaiwahine, Ngāti Kahungunu, Ngāpuhi, Te Rarawa, Ngāti Kuri and Ngāti Ruanui iwi.

== Theatre productions ==
1988 – Through structured devising processes, Kia Maumahara and Watea (Good for Something) evolved into public performances at Arohata Prison in Christchurch. The collective memories and testimony of Māori and Pacific Island working-class women focussed on their oppression, especially sexual abuse.

2000 – Purotu, the Magic Within was devised with young people in care at the Northern Residential Centre, using dialogue scenes interspersed with individual song/rap etc.

2001 – Te Ahika O Te Manatu Rangatahi was created in Kaikōura, focussing especially on teenage angst.

2002 – Te Waka Toi o Ngati Toa was a youth project for a large cast focussing on themes of abandonment, violence, sexual abuse and addiction through 18 scripted sequences, rap, breakdancing and beat-boxing as well as traditional haka and waiata.

2005 – The Battalion- Ka Whawhai Tonu Matau Ake! Ake! Ake!, scripted by Pearse-Otene, involves 'suitcase', storytelling theatre with minimal props. Two youth at risk are helping an old man clean up a marae for a Maori Battalion reunion as a frame for flashbacks to troubling war experiences.

2008 – Ka Mate, Ka Ora, scripted by Pearse-Otene, is based on the Vietnam War with a veteran who becomes mad (pōrangi). His memories are interwoven with the ghost of Te Rauparaha.

2017 – The Undertow: The Ragged, Dog & Bone, Public Works and The Landeaters at Te Papa: The Museum of New Zealand scripted by Pearse-Otene

== Publications ==
- Pearse-Otene, H. (2021). ‘Hinenui Te Pō is a light in the darkness’: Performing pūrākau in research on incest and childhood sexual abuse. The Journal of Indigenous Wellbeing: Te Mauri – Pimatisiwin 6(3): 96-109.
- Pearse-Otene, H. (2021). Decolonising theatre and ensemble training in Aotearoa/New Zealand: Te Rākau Hua o Te Wao Tapu Theatre. Theatre, Dance and Performance Training 12(1): 95-111.
- Pearse-Otene, Helen (2020). "Theatre Marae" (PDF). MAI A New Zealand Journal of Indigenous Scholarship. vol 9 issue 3: 226–336 .MAI_Jrnl_2020_V9_3_Otene_FINAL.pdf
- Pearse-Otene, H. (2020). The underTOW. Wellington, N.Z: Te Rākau Hua O Te Wao Tapu Trust.
- Pearse-Otene, H., & Burdan, A. (2015). Meariki: Te rapunga i te pono. Wellington, N.Z: Huia Publishers.
- Pearse-Otene, H., Burdan, A., & Morrison, S. (2013). Te huakore: Te muna o te whatu. Wellington, N.Z: Huia mō Te Tāhuhu o te Mātauranga.
- Burdan, A., Pearse-Otene, H., Teepa, K., & McNaughton, T. O. P. (2012). Arohanui. Te Whanganui-a-Tara, Aotearoa: He mea whakaputa tēnei tuhinga e Huia Publishers.

== Awards and recognition ==
- In 2017, Pearse-Otene was awarded a Whāia Ngā Pae o Te Māramatanga Doctoral Excellence Scholarship.
- In 2010, Pearse-Otene won "Best Female Actor - Feature Film" at Wairoa Māori Film Festival for her role in No Petrol, No Diesel!.
