= 1881 Southern Maori by-election =

New Zealand by-election

The 1881 Southern Maori by-election was a by-election held on 1 March 1881 in the Southern Maori electorate during the 7th New Zealand Parliament.

The by-election was caused by the resignation of the incumbent MP Ihaia Tainui.

The by-election was won by Hōri Kerei Taiaroa; he had been disqualified from the Legislative Council and Tainui had resigned so that he could return to the Lower House.

There was no vote as Taiaroa was unopposed.
