= 1885 Southern Maori by-election =

New Zealand by-election

The 1885 Southern Maori by-election was a by-election held on 10 June 1885 in the Southern Maori electorate during the 9th New Zealand Parliament. The by-election was caused by the resignation of the incumbent, Hōri Kerei Taiaroa, when he was re-appointed to the Legislative Council. Taiaroa had been appointed to the Legislative Council in February 1879, but in August 1880 he was disqualified over a technicality, a cause of bitterness and resentment among Māori. When appointed by Sir George Grey, Taiaroa held (and continued to hold) a salaried (government) office, hence was not eligible to sit in the council, despite having attended three sessions. The by-election was won by Tame Parata.

== Results ==
1885 Southern Maori by-election
Party	Candidate	Votes	%	±%
Independent	Tame Parata	147	42.61	
Independent	Henare Paratini	104	30.14	
Independent	Hone Taare Tikao	94	27.25	
Majority		43	12.46	
Turnout		345		
