= 1879 Southern Maori by-election =

New Zealand by-election

The 1879 Southern Maori by-election was a by-election held on 7 July 1879 in the Southern Maori electorate during the 6th New Zealand Parliament.

The by-election was caused by the resignation of the incumbent MP Hōri Kerei Taiaroa when he was appointed to the Legislative Council.

The by-election was won by Ihaia Tainui.

== Results ==
The following table gives the election results:

1879 Southern Maori by-election
Party	Candidate	Votes	%	±%
Independent	Ihaia Tainui	191	49.23	
Independent	Tari Wi or Toihaka	78	20.10	
Independent	Hori Paratene	60	15.46	
Majority		113	29.12	
Turnout		388		
