= Henare Uru =

New Zealand politician (1872–1929)

Member of the New Zealand Parliament for Southern Maori
- In office 1922–1928
- Preceded by: Hopere Uru
- Succeeded by: Tuiti Makitanara

Personal details
- Born: Henare Whakatau Uru; 1872 Kaiapoi, New Zealand
- Died: 7 March 1929 (aged 56) Wellington, New Zealand
- Spouses: Ruita Te Aika (m. 1891; div. 1896) Gladys Constance Mary Rogers (m. 1915)
- Relations: Hopere Uru (brother); Tui Uru (daughter); Jade Uru (great-grandson); Storm Uru (great-grandson)
- Children: Four

Henare Whakatau Uru (1872 – 7 March 1929) was a New Zealand politician. He was the Reform Party Member of Parliament for Southern Maori from 1922 to 1928.

== Early life and family ==
Uru was born at Kaiapoi in 1872. His father was Hoani Uru, a farmer, and his mother was Kataraina Kaiparoa. A member of the Ngāi Tūāhuriri hapū (sub-tribe) of Ngāi Tahu, Uru was educated at Rangiora High School.

He married Ruita Te Aika in 1891, but the couple divorced in 1896. Uru subsequently married Gladys Constance Mary Rogers in 1915. Their son, also named Henare Whakatau Uru, served as a pilot officer during World War II and was killed while on operations over Europe with 299 Sqn in 1944. Their daughter, Tui Uru, was the first Māori presenter on New Zealand television.

Uru was known as a sportsman in his teens and 20s, playing rugby union for the Kaiapoi Football Club, and being involved in athletics, wrestling and tennis. He was also a noted cyclist.

A member of the North Canterbury Mounted Rifle Volunteers, Uru attended the opening of the Australian federal parliament in 1901. He also managed the Rapaki Music Company and has been credited with introducing the tune Now is the Hour to New Zealand.

== Political career ==
New Zealand Parliament
Years	Term	Electorate	Party
1922	20th	Southern Maori	Reform
1922–1925	21st	Southern Maori	Reform
1925–1928	22nd	Southern Maori	Reform

Uru won the Southern Maori electorate in the 1922 Southern Maori by-election following the death of his brother Hopere Uru in November 1921. He retained his seat at the 1922 and 1925 general elections, but was defeated in 1928 when he finished third behind Tuiti Makitanara and Eruera Tirikatene.

Uru's main parliamentary contribution was the progression of Ngāi Tahu issues, leading to the formation of the Ngaitahu Trust Board in 1929. He was also a member of the Board of Maori Ethnological Research. He died in Wellington in 1929 and was buried at Tuahiwi, near Kaiapoi.

New Zealand Parliament
Preceded by Hopere Uru	Member of Parliament for Southern Maori; 1922–1928	Succeeded by Tuiti Makitanara
