= Storm Uru =

New Zealand rower (born 1985)

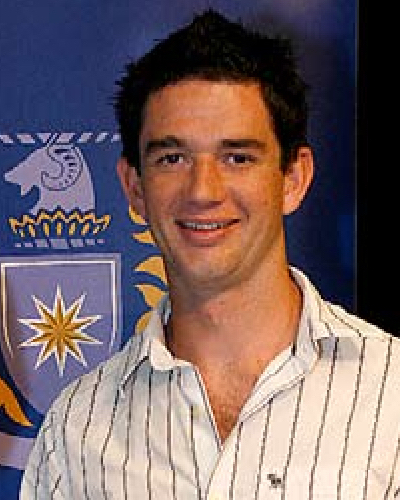
- Uru in 2007

Personal information
- Born: 14 February 1985 (age 41) Invercargill, New Zealand
- Height: 1.90 m (6 ft 3 in)
- Weight: 74 kg (163 lb) (2010)
- Relatives: Jade Uru (brother); Tui Uru (great-aunt); Henare Uru (great-grandfather)
- Website: www.stormuru.com

Sport
- Country: New Zealand
- Sport: Rowing
- Event: Lightweight double sculls
- Club: Waihopai RC
Medal record
Representing New Zealand
Olympic Games
Bronze medal – third place	2012 London	Lightweight double sculls
World Championships
Gold medal – first place	2009 Poznań	Lightweight double sculls
Silver medal – second place	2011 Bled	Lightweight double sculls
Bronze medal – third place	2010 Karapiro	Lightweight double sculls

Storm William Uru (born 14 February 1985) is a New Zealand rower. He is from Ngāi Tahu tribe.

== Early life ==
Uru was born on 14 February 1985 in Invercargill. His younger brother, Jade Uru, is also a rower. The broadcaster Tui Uru (1926–2013) was their great-aunt. Tui Uru's father, the Reform Party MP Henare Uru, was a great-grandfather to the rowers.

Uru studied at Massey University and graduated with a Bachelor of Business Studies in finance in 2009 and a Master of Management in international business in 2012.

== Rowing career ==
Uru competed for New Zealand in Beijing at the 2008 Olympics. With Peter Taylor he finished 7th in the Men's lightweight double sculls at the 2008 Summer Olympics.

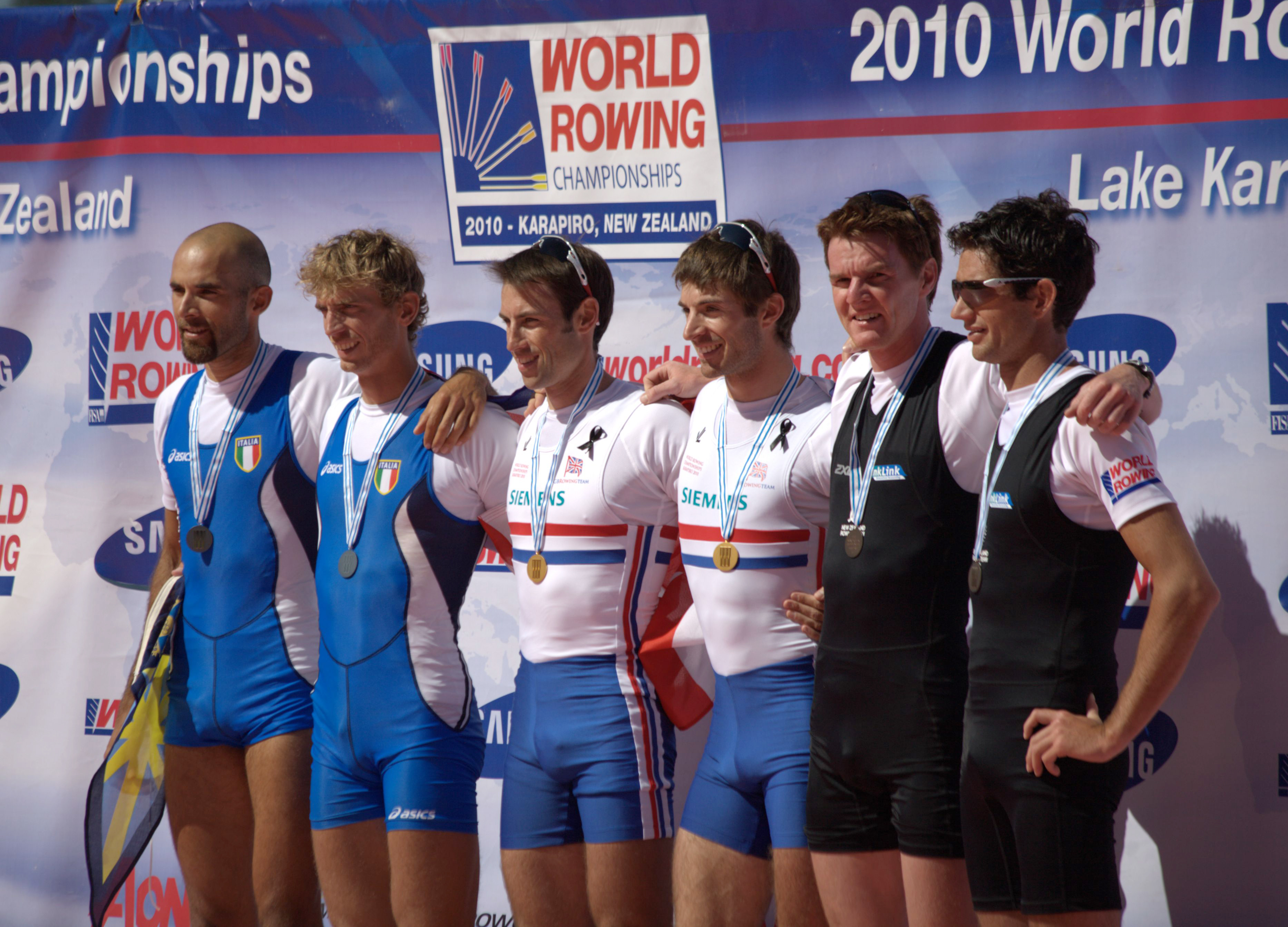
Uru (far right), at the medal ceremony for the lightweight double sculls at the 2010 World Rowing Championships at Lake Karapiro

At the 2009 World Rowing Championships, Uru and Taylor won the gold medal in the lightweight double sculls, and took the bronze medal at the following year's World Championships.

At the 2012 Summer Olympics, Uru and Taylor won the bronze medal in the lightweight double sculls.

Uru rowed at Bow for the winning Oxford crew in the 2014 Boat Race.

== After rowing ==
In 2013, Uru was awarded a Woolf Fisher Scholarship which allowed for his studies at the University of Oxford. He now works for fund management firm Liontrust Asset Management.
