= Jim Moriarty =

New Zealand actor

Jim Moriarty MNZM
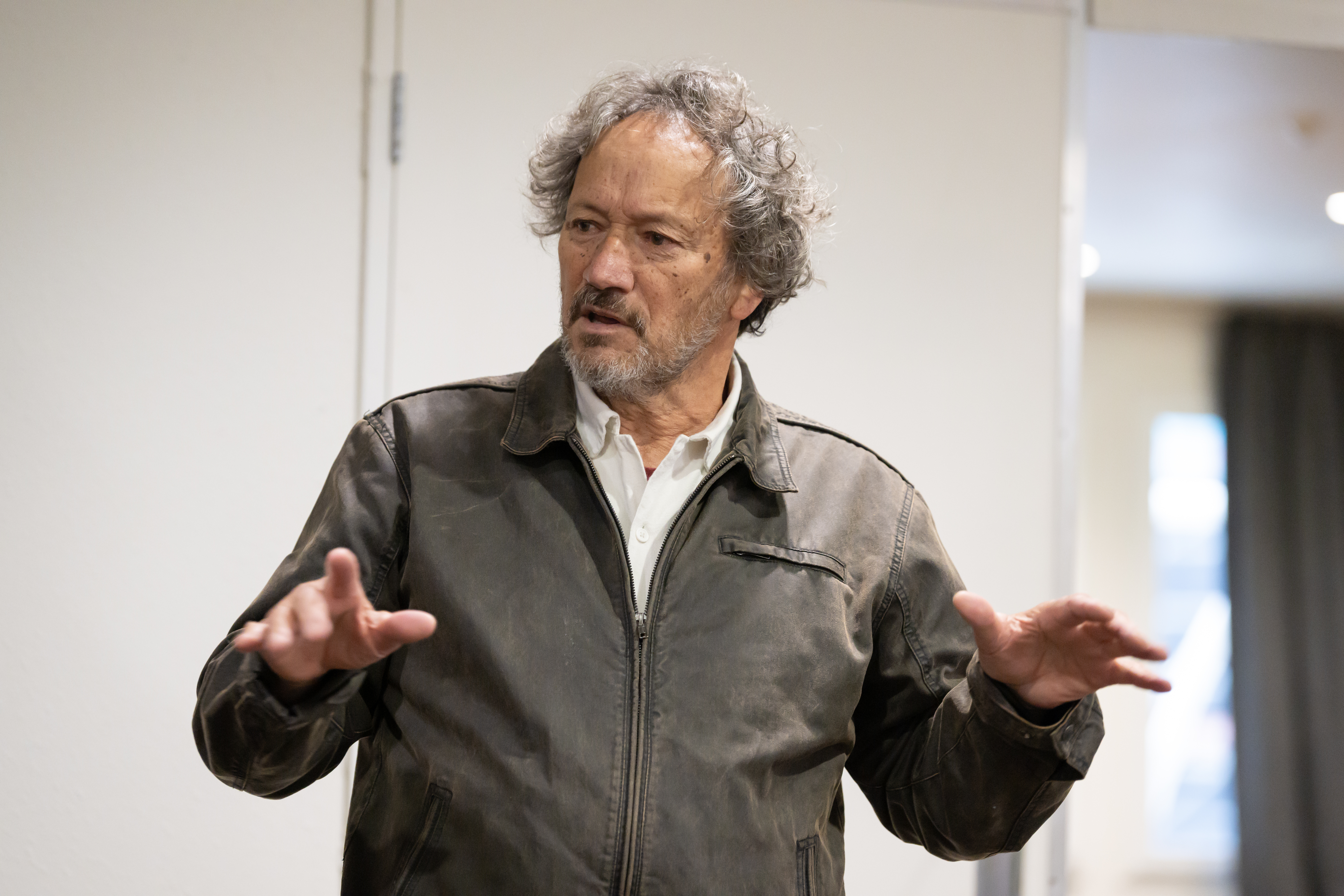
- Moriarty at a Wikipedia conference in 2026
- Born: James Moriarty
- Occupations: Actor and theatre director
- Years active: 1967–present

James Moriarty MNZM is a New Zealand actor and theatre director, who began acting professionally in 1967. He came to national attention and is probably best known for his role as the school teacher Riki Winiata in the 1970s soap opera Close to Home. His work has toured nationally and internationally. Moriarty is from the Māori iwi of Ngāti Toa, Ngāti Koata and Ngāti Kahungunu.

He is also known for his performance as a Vietnam War veteran in John Broughton's solo work Michael James Manaia which toured New Zealand and played at the Edinburgh Festival in 1991.

Moriarty is the artistic director of Te Rakau Hua O Te Wao Tapu Trust, a performing arts organisation that works with at-risk communities, creating and performing theatre in schools, marae and prisons, as well as professional theatres.

In the 2001 Queen's Birthday Honours, Moriarty was appointed a Member of the New Zealand Order of Merit, for services to drama.

Moriarty has eight children and his partner is playwright Helen Pearse-Otene.
