= David Eade =

New Zealand rower

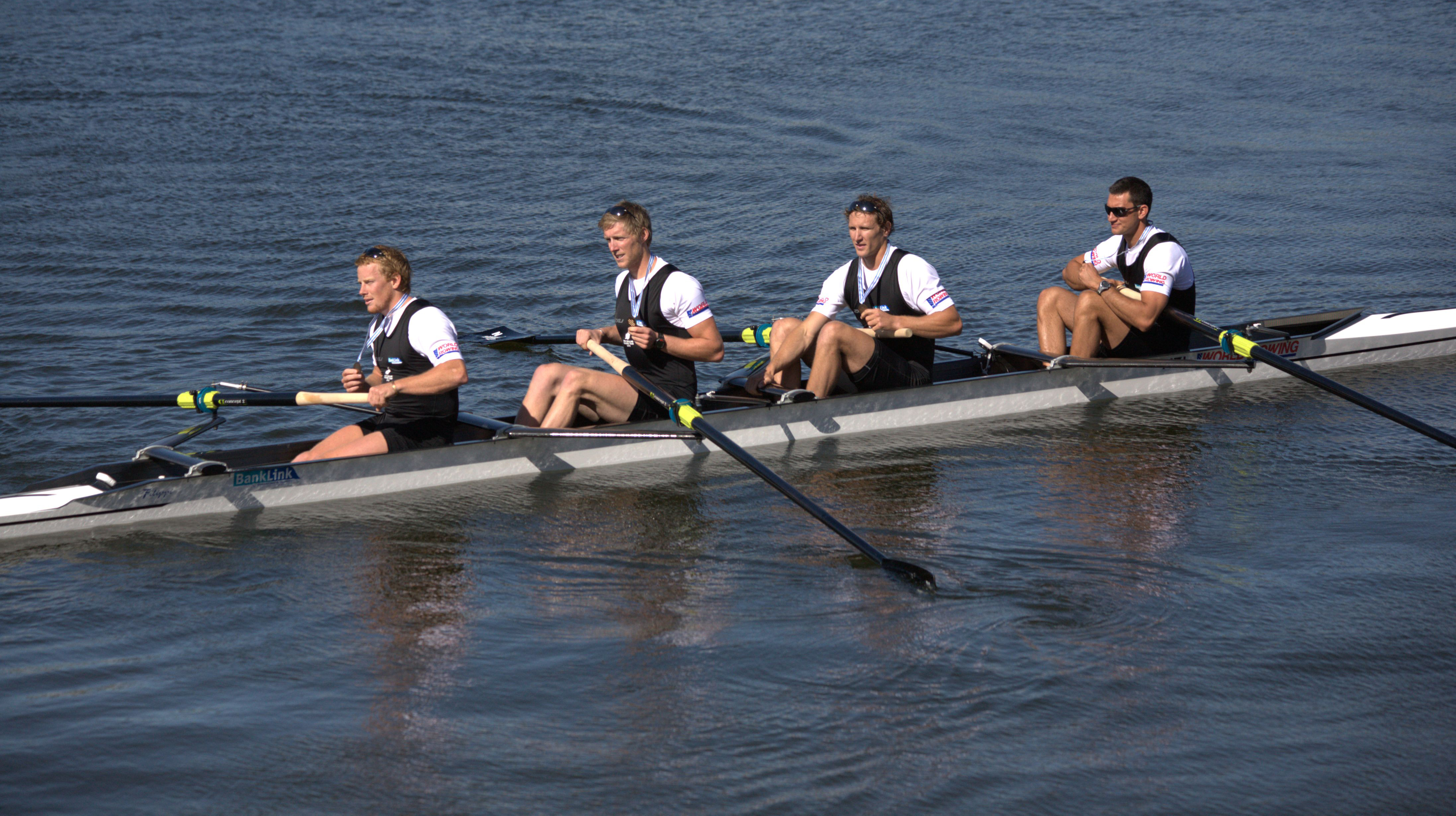
- Eade in 2010 seated as stroke

Personal information
- Born: 4 September 1988 (age 37)
Medal record
Men's rowing
Representing New Zealand
World Championships
Bronze medal – third place	2010 Lake Karapiro	M4−

David Eade (born 4 September 1988) is a New Zealand rower.

At the 2010 World Rowing Championships, he won a bronze medal in the men's four partnering with Simon Watson, Hamish Burson, and Jade Uru.
