= Whetu Tirikatene-Sullivan =

New Zealand politician

The Honourable Whetu Tirikatene-Sullivan ONZ
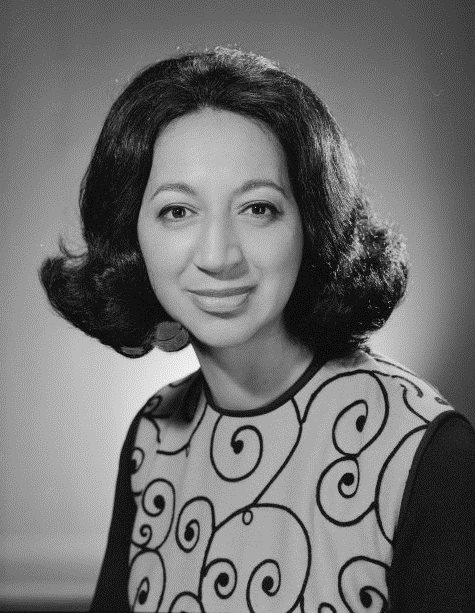
- Whetu Tirikatene-Sullivan circa 1960

3rd Minister for the Environment
- In office 10 September 1974 – 12 December 1975
- Prime Minister: Bill Rowling
- Preceded by: Joe Walding
- Succeeded by: Venn Young

20th Minister of Tourism
- In office 8 December 1972 – 12 December 1975
- Prime Minister: Norman Kirk; Bill Rowling
- Preceded by: Bert Walker
- Succeeded by: Harry Lapwood

Member of the New Zealand Parliament for Southern Maori
- In office 11 March 1967 – 12 October 1996
- Preceded by: Eruera Tirikātene
- Succeeded by: Constituency Abolished

Personal details
- Born: 9 January 1932 Rātana Pā, New Zealand
- Died: 20 July 2011 (aged 79) Wellington, New Zealand
- Party: Labour Party
- Spouse: Denis Sullivan (m. 1967)
- Relations: Eruera Tirikātene (father); Rino Tirikatene (nephew)
- Education: Rangiora High School, Wellington East Girls' College
- Alma mater: Australian National University

Tini "Whetu" Marama Tirikatene-Sullivan ONZ (9 January 1932 – 20 July 2011) was a New Zealand politician. She was an MP from 1967 to 1996, representing the Labour Party and was New Zealand’s first Māori woman cabinet minister, and, at the age of 40, was the youngest. Whetu was very influential in Māori affairs, civil and women's rights. At the time of her retirement, she was the second longest-serving MP in Parliament, being in her tenth term of office. She was one of twenty holders of the Order of New Zealand, the highest honour of the country.

== Early life ==
Whetu Marama Tirikatene was born on 9 January 1932, the daughter of Eruera Tirikatene and Ruti Tirikatene (née Solomon). Her iwi are Ngāi Tahu and Ngāti Kahungunu. She was raised at Rātana Pā by her grandmother, dress designer and tailor Amiria Henrici Solomon. Educated at Rangiora High School and Wellington East Girls' College, she excelled in dancing, winning the New Zealand amateur Latin American ballroom dancing championship with her Australian partner Kevin Mansfield, and was also accomplished in fencing, becoming one of the top four female fencers in the country. She studied for a PhD in political science at the Australian National University, with the topic "Contemporary Maori Political Involvement". While there, she met Denis Sullivan, a physics PhD student who later became an associate professor in physics and astrophysics at Victoria University of Wellington, and they were married in Canberra on 18 March 1967.

== Member of Parliament ==
New Zealand Parliament
Years	Term	Electorate	Party
1967–1969	35th	Southern Maori	Labour
1969–1972	36th	Southern Maori	Labour
1972–1975	37th	Southern Maori	Labour
1975–1978	38th	Southern Maori	Labour
1978–1981	39th	Southern Maori	Labour
1981–1984	40th	Southern Maori	Labour
1984–1987	41st	Southern Maori	Labour
1987–1990	42nd	Southern Maori	Labour
1990–1993	43rd	Southern Maori	Labour
1993–1996	44th	Southern Maori	Labour

Her brother Te Rino Tirikatene stood unsuccessfully for the Labour Party in the 1963 election and 1966 election for Rangiora. When their father Sir Eruera Tirikatene died in 1967 many expected Te Rino to succeed him as MP for Southern Maori. As Te Rino was part-Maori and entitled to choose between being on the Maori and European electoral rolls, at the time of the by-election he was registered on the European roll in Rangiora where he had to remain under the electoral act until the next general election, which made it unlikely he would be eligible as a candidate in Southern Maori. With her brother effectively ruled out, attention turned to Tirikatene (studying in Australia at the time) as the likely Labour candidate for the seat. She was eventually selected as Labour's candidate.

She duly was elected to succeed her father in Parliament at the Southern Maori by-election of 1967. Between 1972 and 1975, she was the Minister of Tourism, the first Māori woman to serve as a Government Minister. In addition, she was Associate minister of Social Welfare from 1972 to 1974. She was Minister for the Environment from 1974 to 1975. She was re-elected by substantial majorities until the 1996 election, when the Southern Maori electorate was abolished in the transition to MMP. Tirikatene-Sullivan then contested the new Te Tai Tonga electorate, which covered much of the same territory as the old Southern Maori electorate, but she was narrowly defeated by Tu Wyllie of New Zealand First. She subsequently retired from politics.

In 1970, Tirikatene-Sullivan became the second woman to give birth whilst an MP. She later became the first (both in New Zealand and the Commonwealth) cabinet minister to give birth to a child.

On 6 February 1993, Tirikatene-Sullivan was appointed a Member of the Order of New Zealand, the highest civilian award given by the New Zealand government. The same year, she was awarded the New Zealand Suffrage Centennial Medal. She died in Wellington on 20 July 2011.

== Legacy ==
Tirikatene-Sullivan was the youngest Māori woman elected at the time, she was also the first Māori woman to be a cabinet minister, and the first sitting MP to give birth in New Zealand. In 2016, her portrait was raised alongside Iriaka Rātana in the New Zealand Parliament Buildings at Mātangireia. The portraits were hung with a special ceremony held to commemorate them, with extended family attending the ceremony. Tirikatene-Sullivan's 29 years representing Southern Maori was the longest at the time, and was only surpassed by Annette King's 30 years as the longest-serving women in New Zealand's Parliament.

Tirikatene-Sullivan was particularly known for her style of dress, often wearing fashionable outfits rather than the suits many professional women wore at the time. She was a patron of the arts, and she commissioned garments from contemporary Māori artists. These included artists like Sandy Adsett, Para Matchitt, Cliff Whiting, and Frank Davis. The Māori motifs that were incorporated into her outfits was unique for the time, and exposed New Zealanders to a new expression of Māori art. Tirikatene-Sullivan was acutely aware that her style of dress and design choice served as a political statement, and was conscious of the transformative power her style of dress served. As Minister of Tourism, she took her unique style to locations such as Australia's Sydney Opera House, where she exhibited her Tania evening gown featuring a kowhaiwhai motif on a global stage. Her collection of outfits was exhibited at MTG Hawke's Bay at an exhibition titled Whetu Tirikatene-Sullivan: Travel in Style.

== Other Achievements ==
Whetu was a New Zealand women's fencing champion, a jewellery designer, and cello and violin player.

== Notes ==
Political offices
Preceded by Joe Walding	Minister for the Environment; 1974–1975	Succeeded by Venn Young
Preceded by Bert Walker	Minister of Tourism; 1972–1975	Succeeded by Harry Lapwood
New Zealand Parliament
Preceded by Eruera Tirikatene	Member of Parliament for Southern Maori; 1967–1996	Constituency abolished
