= Weretā Tainui Pītama =

New Zealand farmer and board chairman

Weretā Tainui Pītama (1881 – 5 April 1930) was a New Zealand farmer, land claimant and trust board chairman of Māori descent, affiliated with the Ngāi Tahu iwi. He was born in 1881 at Te Rāpaki-o-Te Rakiwhakaputa.

He stood as an independent candidate in the 1922 by-election for the Southern Maori electorate.
