= Iraia Te Ama-o-te-rangi Te Whaiti =

New Zealand tribal leader, farmer and historian

Iraia Te Ama-o-te-rangi Te Whaiti (c.1861 – 15 November 1918) was a notable New Zealand tribal leader, farmer and historian. Of Māori descent, he identified with the Ngāti Kahungunu iwi. He was born in the Wairarapa, New Zealand in 1861. Teoti Kerei Te Hioirangi Te Whāiti was a son of his. He is the great-great-great-grandfather of Jemaine Clement.
