= Bill Barrett (Māori leader) =

Ngai Tahu leader, land court agent, trust board secretary

William Daniel Barrett (27 October 1878 – 23 May 1953) was a New Zealand tribal leader, land court agent and trust board secretary. Of Māori descent, he identified with the Ngai Tahu (South Island) iwi. He was born in Riverton, Southland, New Zealand on 27 October 1878.

He stood as an Independent candidate in the 1922 by-election for the Southern Maori electorate. In 1953, he was posthumously awarded the Queen Elizabeth II Coronation Medal.
