= Hamish Burson =

New Zealand rower

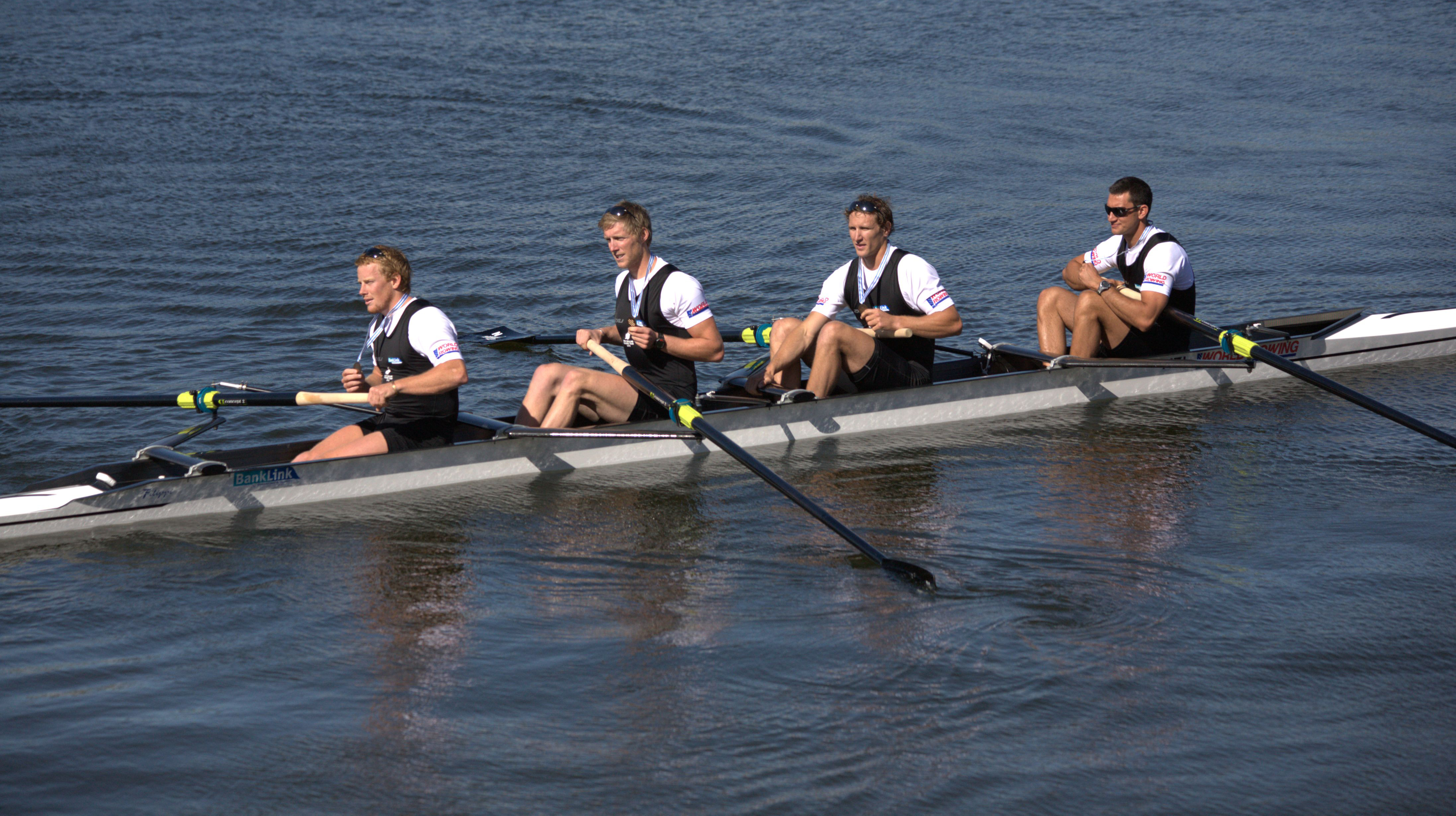
- Burson in 2010 in seat 3

Personal information
- Born: 13 April 1987 (age 39)
Medal record
Men's rowing
Representing New Zealand
World Championships
Bronze medal – third place	2010 Lake Karapiro	M4−

Hamish Burson (born 13 April 1987) is a New Zealand rower.

At the 2010 World Rowing Championships, he won a bronze medal in the men's four partnering with Simon Watson, Jade Uru, and David Eade.
