= Ihaia Tainui =

New Zealand politician (died 1885)

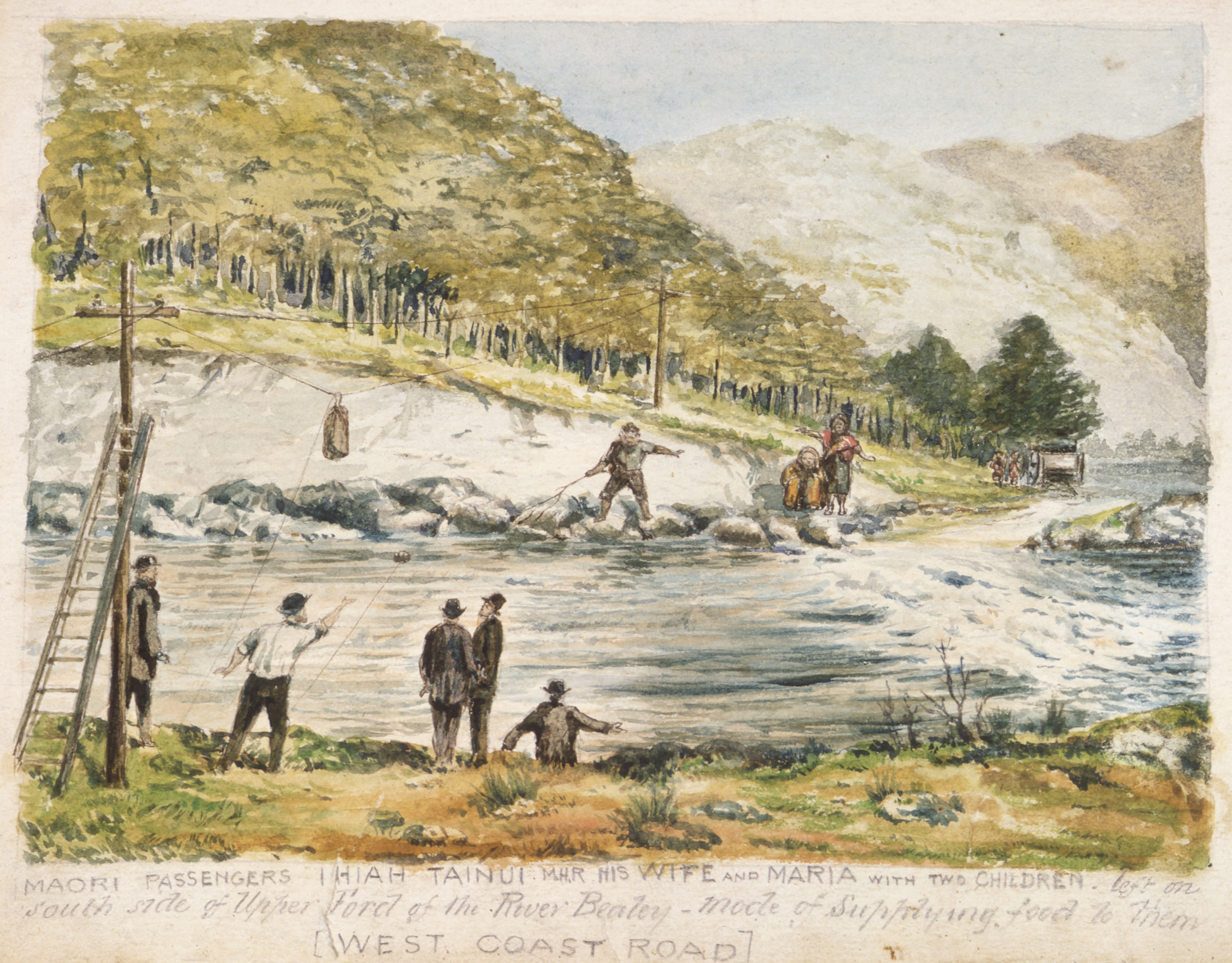
- Ihaia Tainui stranded at the Bealey River, c.1880

Member of the New Zealand Parliament for Southern Maori
- In office 1879–1881
- Preceded by: Hōri Kerei Taiaroa
- Succeeded by: Hōri Kerei Taiaroa

Personal details
- Died: 19 October 1885 Arahura Pā, Westland, New Zealand
- Relations: Tuhuru Kokare (grandfather)

Ihaia Tainui (died 19 October 1885) was a Māori member of the New Zealand parliament.

He was the son of Wereta Tainui and grandson of Tuhuru Kokare, both chiefs of the Ngāi Tahu hapū (sub-tribe) Ngāti Waewae.

New Zealand Parliament
Years	Term	Electorate	Party
1879	6th	Southern Maori	Independent
1879–1881	7th	Southern Maori	Independent

He represented the electorate of Southern Maori from 1879 (after Hōri Kerei Taiaroa was disqualified) to 1881, when he resigned and Hori Taiaroa resumed the electorate.

Tainui committed suicide by hanging on 19 October 1885 in the whare rūnanga at Arahura Pā, north of Hokitika.

New Zealand Parliament
Preceded by Hōri Kerei Taiaroa	Member of Parliament for Southern Maori; 1879–1881	Succeeded by Hōri Kerei Taiaroa
