= Jade Uru =

New Zealand rower

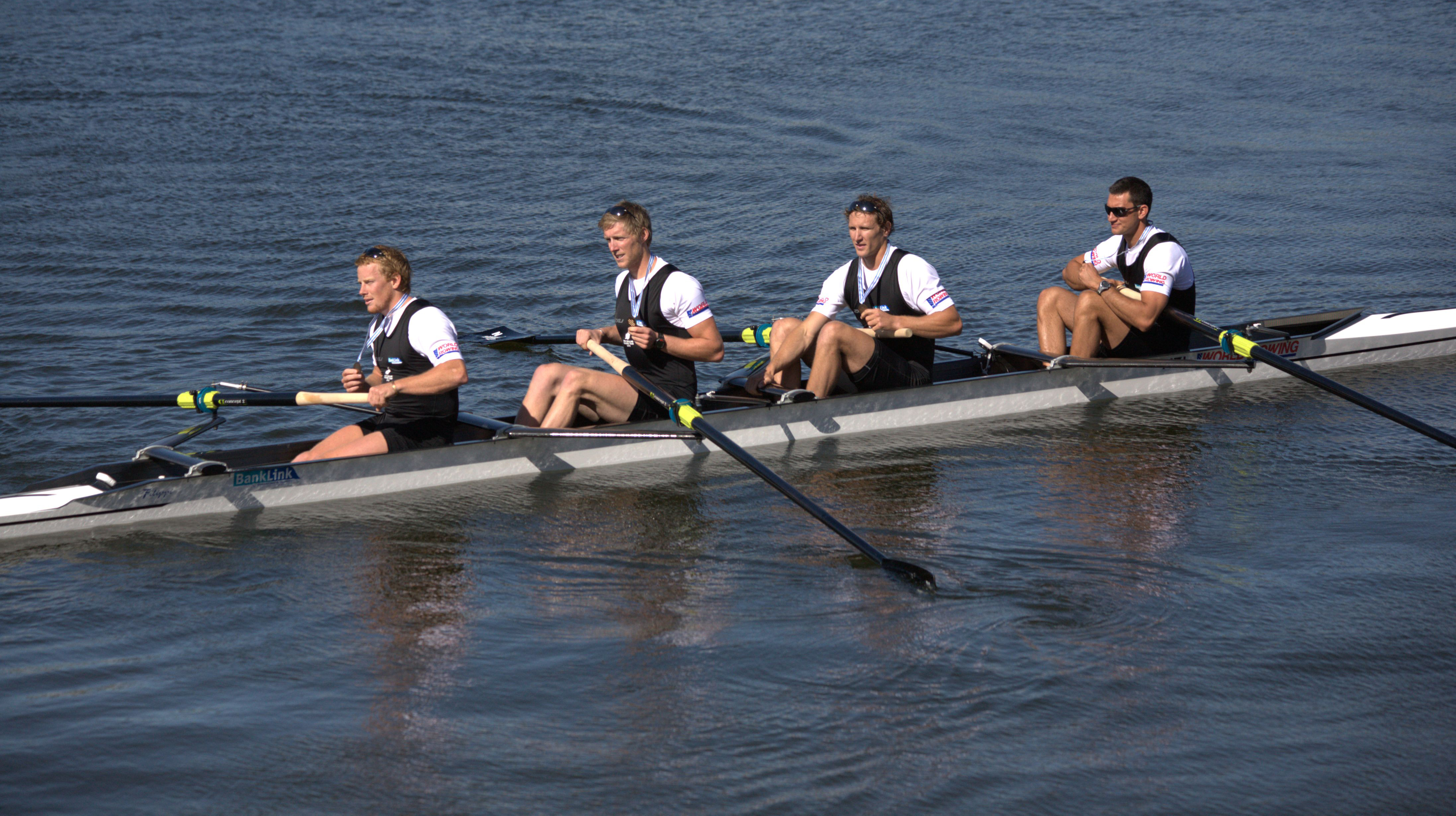
- Uru in 2010 seated in the bow

Personal information
- Born: 20 October 1987 (age 38) Invercargill, Southland, New Zealand
- Relative(s): Storm Uru (brother); Tui Uru (great-aunt); Henare Uru (great-grandfather)

Sport
- Country: New Zealand
- Sport: Rowing
Medal record
Men's rowing
Representing New Zealand
World Championships
| Bronze medal – third place | 2010 Lake Karapiro | M4− |

Jade Uru (born 20 October 1987) is a New Zealand rower.

He is from Ngāi Tahu tribe and brother of Storm Uru. The broadcaster Tui Uru (1926–2013) was their great-aunt. Tui Uru's father, the Reform Party MP Henare Uru, was a great-grandfather to the rowers.

At the 2010 World Rowing Championships, he won a bronze medal in the men's four partnering with Simon Watson, Hamish Burson, and David Eade. Uru competed at the 2012 Olympics in the men's four, and the boat came fifth in the B final.

Jade represented New Zealand in the men's quad at the 2016 Olympics in Rio de Janeiro, alongside John Storey, George Bridgewater and Nathan Flannery (bow). The Kiwi quartet replaced Russia in the Olympic field after a positive test returned by Sergey Fedorovtsev—a member of the Russian crew that won the "Last Chance" Olympic qualifying regatta in Lucerne, Switzerland, in May—saw the Russian boat disqualified by the world rowing federation.
