= Hopere Uru =

New Zealand politician and sportsman

Member of the New Zealand Parliament for Southern Maori
- In office 1918–1921
- Preceded by: Taare Parata
- Succeeded by: Henare Uru

Personal details
- Born: 26 March 1868 Kaiapoi, New Zealand
- Died: 29 November 1921 (aged 53) Wellington, New Zealand
- Spouses: Rahera Muriwai Mutu (m. 1892; div. 1915); Riwaka Anaha Tauwhare (m. 1916)
- Relations: Henare Uru (brother); Tui Uru (niece)
- Cricket career

Cricket information
- Bowling: Fast
- Role: Bowler

Domestic team information
- Years: Team
- 1894: Canterbury
- First-class debut: 2 April 1894 v Hawke's Bay
- Last First-class: 9 November 1894 v Wellington

Career statistics
Competition	First-class
Matches	2
Runs scored	2
Batting average	1.00
100s/50s	0/0
Top score	2
Balls bowled	300
Wickets	9
Bowling average	11.33
5 wickets in innings	1
10 wickets in match	0
Best bowling	5-43
Catches/stumpings	4/0
- Source: Cricket Archive

John Hopere Wharewiti Uru (26 March 1868 – 29 November 1921), sometimes known as Billy Uru, was a New Zealand sportsman and politician. He represented Canterbury at both cricket and rugby union, and was an independent (and sometimes Reform) Member of Parliament for Southern Maori.

== Early life and family ==
Uru was born at Kaiapoi, the son of farmer Hoani Uru and his wife Kataraina Kaiparoa, probably on 26 March 1868. A member of the Ngāi Tūāhuriri hapū (sub-tribe) of Ngāi Tahu, Uru was educated at Te Aute College from 1889. He married Rahera Muriwai Mutu in 1892; the couple subsequently divorced in 1915 and it is not thought that they had any children. The following year he remarried, to Riwaka Anaha Tauwhare, and subsequently had two children.

A captain in the North Canterbury Mounted Rifle Volunteers, Uru was sergeant of the Māori contingent at the diamond jubilee of Queen Victoria in London in 1897, commander of the Māori contingent at the opening of Australia's federal parliament in 1901, and second-in-command of the New Zealand contingent at the coronation of Edward VII.

== Sporting career ==
A fast bowler, Uru played two first-class games for the Canterbury cricket team, one in each of the 1893–94 and 1894-95 seasons. He took nine wickets at an average of 11.33, and achieved best bowling figures of 5 for 43.

Uru also represented Canterbury at rugby union as a three-quarter in 1896, and was noted as a fine kicker. He was a member of the Kaiapoi Football Club, which later became the Tuahiwi Club, of which he was captain. In 1896 his playing weight was 97 kg (213 lb).

He was also noted as a wrestler, hammer thrower and caber tosser.

== Political career ==
New Zealand Parliament
Years	Term	Electorate	Party
1918–1919	19th	Southern Maori	Independent
1919–1921	20th	Southern Maori	Independent

Uru unsuccessfully stood for Parliament in the Southern Maori electorate against Tame Parata at the 1905, 1908 and 1911 general elections. Finally, in the 1918 by-election precipitated by the death of sitting member Taare Parata, Uru was elected to Parliament, defeating Parata's brother Henare Parata, with a majority of 19 votes (242 votes to 223). Uru was an independent member, but tended to align himself with the Reform Party. He was re-elected at the 1919 general election and held the seat until his death from Bright's disease in Wellington on 29 November 1921. His body was returned to Tuahiwi Pā, near Kaiapoi, for lying in state before burial.

He was active in Ngāi Tahu's political and legal fight for resources and land. In 1907 he was elected secretary of Te Kerēme o Ngāi Tahu rāua ko Ngāti Māmoe, the Ngāi Tahu committee charged with pursuing the tribe's claim. While in Parliament, he was successful in seeking the establishment of a commission to investigate the Kemp Purchase (the purchase in 1848 of 20 million acres of land in Canterbury for £2,000).

New Zealand Parliament
Preceded by Taare Parata	Member of Parliament for Southern Maori; 1918–1921	Succeeded by Henare Uru
