= SS Taiaroa =

SS Taiaroa is the name of the following ships:

- SS Taiaroa (1875)
- SS Taiaroa (1943)

== See also ==
- Taiaroa (disambiguation)
