= Teoti Kerei Te Hioirangi Te Whāiti =

New Zealand tribal leader

Teoti Kerei Te Hioirangi Te Whāiti (1890–1964) was a notable New Zealand tribal leader, farmer and community leader. Of Māori descent, he identified with the Ngāti Kahungunu iwi. He was born in Pirinoa, Wairarapa, New Zealand, in 1890. His father was Iraia Te Ama-o-te-rangi Te Whaiti.
