= Simon Watson (rower) =

New Zealand rower

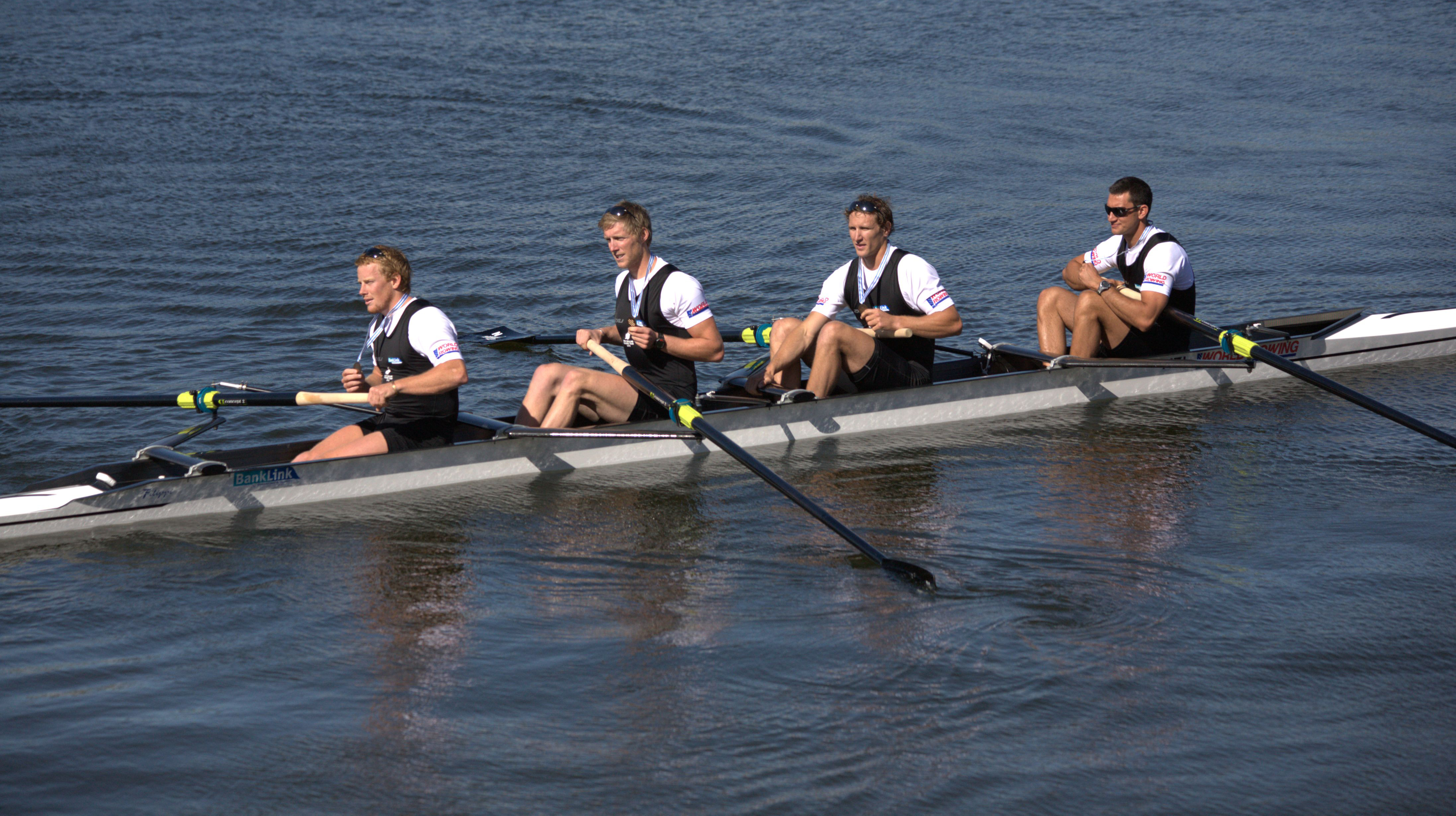
- Watson in 2010 in seat 2

Personal information
- Born: 8 August 1987 (age 38)
Medal record
Men's rowing
Representing New Zealand
World Championships
Bronze medal – third place	2010 Lake Karapiro	M4−

Simon Watson (born 8 August 1987) is a New Zealand rower.

At the 2010 World Rowing Championships, he won a bronze medal in the men's four partnering with Jade Uru, Hamish Burson, and David Eade.
