= Tūhuru Kōkare =

New Zealand tribal leader

Tūhuru Kōkare was a New Zealand Māori chief of Ngāti Waewae, a sub-tribe (hapū) of Ngāi Tahu. He was active from about 1800, and may have died around 1847, although his body is described as being laid to rest in 1953 in a burial cave above Māwhera pā.
