= Tuiti Makitānara =

New Zealand politician

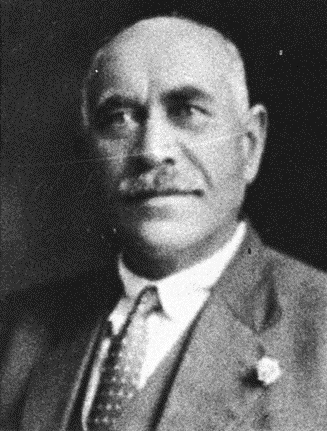

Member of the New Zealand Parliament for Southern Maori
- In office 1928–1932
- Preceded by: Henare Uru
- Succeeded by: Eruera Tirikatene

Personal details
- Born: 8 August 1874 Havelock, New Zealand
- Died: 24 June 1932 (aged 57) Hokio Beach, Kāpiti Coast, New Zealand
- Spouse: Karaitiana McGregor (m. c.1889–1932, his death)

Tuiti Makitānara (8 August 1874 – 24 June 1932), sometimes known as Sweet MacDonald, was a Māori and United Party Member of Parliament in New Zealand.

== Early life and family ==
Of Rangitāne, Ngāti Kuia, Muaūpoko and Ngāti Apa descent, Makitānara was born at Havelock in 1874. His mother was Rina Puhipuhi Meihana and his father was Teoti MacDonald. Predominantly self-educated, Makitānara began working as a farmer with his father at age 14, and later became a flaxmiller in Marlborough and at Foxton. He married Karaitiana McGregor in about 1889 and the couple had eight children.

Makitānara assisted Elsdon Best and William John Elvy with the collection of Māori history in Marlborough, took an active interest in Māori land issues and education, and assisted with the recruitment of Māori during World War I.

== Member of Parliament ==
New Zealand Parliament
Years	Term	Electorate	Party
1928–1931	23rd	Southern Maori	United
1931–1932	24th	Southern Maori	United

Makitānara first stood for Parliament at the 1925 general election as an independent candidate for Southern Maori, finishing second, 16 votes behind the incumbent, Henare Uru, in a field of five.

At the 1928 general election, Makitānara once again stood for the Southern Maori seat, this time as the candidate of the United Party. He tied with the Rātana candidate, Eruera Tirikatene, 198 votes each, but was elected on the casting vote of the returning officer.

Makitānara was re-elected in the 1931 general election, defeating Tirikatene with a majority of 20 votes. However, he died suddenly at Hokio Beach, near Levin, less than seven months later, on 24 June 1932.

New Zealand Parliament
Preceded by Henare Uru	Member of Parliament for Southern Maori; 1928–1932	Succeeded by Eruera Tirikatene
