= Southern Maori =

Southern Maori was one of New Zealand's four original parliamentary Māori electorates established in 1868, along with Northern Maori, Western Maori and Eastern Maori. In 1996, with the introduction of MMP, the Maori electorates were updated, and Southern Maori was replaced with the Te Tai Tonga and Te Puku O Te Whenua electorates.

== Population centres ==
From its initial definition of the Maori electorates in 1867 to the 1954 Maori electoral boundary redefinition, the Southern Maori electorate covered the entire South Island plus it included Stewart Island. It did not include the Chatham Islands, which did not belong to any Maori electorate until after a change to the Legislative Act and from the 1922 election, the Chatham Islands belonged to the Western Maori electorate. The 1954 redefinition responded to the fact that the Southern Maori electorate had a much lower voter base than the three other Maori electorates, and this was responded to by adding the south-eastern part of the North Island to the Southern Maori electorate. Population centres that came to the electorate through this measure included Wellington, Masterton, Palmerston North, Napier, and Wairoa. These changes became effective with the 1954 election.

The next redistribution of Maori electoral boundaries was carried out in 1983, just after the responsibility for doing so had been transferred to the Representation Commission. The North Island boundaries of the Southern Maori electorate were adjusted, and Palmerston North transferred to the Western Maori electorate in that process. These boundaries were used in the 1984 election. Further boundary adjustments were undertaken in 1987, which became operative with the 1987 election.

== Tribal areas ==
Ngāi Tahu and Ngāti Kahungunu were the dominant tribes within the area covered by the electorate.

== History ==
The Southern Maori electorate included the whole of the South Island to 1954, but its population was less than that of the other Māori electorates. In 1954 the boundaries were extended to include much of the East Coast of the North Island up to Napier and Wairoa in Hawkes Bay.

The first member of parliament for the new Māori electorate of Southern Maori from 1868 was John Patterson; he retired in 1870.

In 1932, Eruera Tirikātene won the electorate in a by-election and became the first Rātana MP; and then a Labour MP following the Labour-Ratana pact. When he died in 1967 his daughter Whetu Tirikatene-Sullivan took over the seat in a 1967 by-election.

In 1993 the National Party did not stand a candidate in the electorate as their proposed candidate did not apply in time.

In 1996 with mixed-member proportional (MMP) representation, the Te Tai Tonga electorate covering the South Island took over the major part of the Southern Maori electorate. Whetu Tirikatene-Sullivan who had held the Southern Maori electorate for many years narrowly lost the new seat to Tu Wyllie of New Zealand First and retired from politics.

=== Members of Parliament ===
The Southern Maori electorate was represented by ten Members of Parliament:

Key

Independent Liberal Reform United Ratana Labour

Election	Winner
1868 Māori election	John Patterson
1871 election	Hōri Kerei Taiaroa
1876 election	Hōri Kerei Taiaroa
1879 by-election	Ihaia Tainui
1879 election	Ihaia Tainui
1881 by-election	Hōri Kerei Taiaroa (2nd period)
1881 election	Hōri Kerei Taiaroa (2nd period)
1884 election	Hōri Kerei Taiaroa (2nd period)
1885 by-election	Tame Parata
1887 election	Tame Parata
1890 election	Tame Parata
1893 election	Tame Parata
1896 election	Tame Parata
1899 election	Tame Parata
1902 election	Tame Parata
1905 election	Tame Parata
1908 election	Tame Parata
1911 election	Taare Parata
1914 election	Taare Parata
1918 by-election	Hopere Uru
1919 election	Hopere Uru
1922 by-election	Henare Uru
1922 election	Henare Uru
1925 election	Henare Uru
1928 election	Tuiti Makitānara
1931 election	Tuiti Makitānara
1932 by-election	Eruera Tirikātene
1935 election	Eruera Tirikātene
1938 election	Eruera Tirikātene
1943 election	Eruera Tirikātene
1946 election	Eruera Tirikātene
1949 election	Eruera Tirikātene
1951 election	Eruera Tirikātene
1954 election	Eruera Tirikātene
1957 election	Eruera Tirikātene
1960 election	Eruera Tirikātene
1963 election	Eruera Tirikātene
1966 election	Eruera Tirikātene
1967 by-election	Whetu Tirikatene-Sullivan
1969 election	Whetu Tirikatene-Sullivan
1972 election	Whetu Tirikatene-Sullivan
1975 election	Whetu Tirikatene-Sullivan
1978 election	Whetu Tirikatene-Sullivan
1981 election	Whetu Tirikatene-Sullivan
1984 election	Whetu Tirikatene-Sullivan
1987 election	Whetu Tirikatene-Sullivan
1990 election	Whetu Tirikatene-Sullivan
1993 election	Whetu Tirikatene-Sullivan
(Electorate abolished in 1996; see Te Tai Tonga)

== Election results ==
Note that the affiliation of many early candidates is not known.

=== 1993 election ===
1993 general election: Southern Maori
Party	Candidate	Votes	%	±%
Labour	Whetu Tirikatene-Sullivan	9,631	57.94	−16.56
NZ First	Jules Parkinson	3,291	19.80	
Alliance	Tikirau Stevens	2,541	15.28	+3.64
Mana Māori	Reitu Noble Harris	702	4.22	
Christian Heritage	Rawiri Whare	336	2.02	
Natural Law	Tim Irwin	119	0.71	
Majority		6,340	38.14	−24.72
Turnout		16,620	63.96	−5.69
Registered electors		25,984		

=== 1990 election ===
1990 general election: Southern Maori
Party	Candidate	Votes	%	±%
Labour	Whetu Tirikatene-Sullivan	9,024	74.50	−2.38
Mana Motuhake	Tikirau Stevens	1,410	11.64	+1.92
National	Jack Mei	1,287	10.62	+2.81
Independent	Dun Mihaka	391	3.22	+0.80
Majority		7,614	62.86	−4.29
Turnout		12,112	58.27	−10.69
Registered electors		20,785		

=== 1987 election ===
1987 general election: Southern Maori
Party	Candidate	Votes	%	±%
Labour	Whetu Tirikatene-Sullivan	10,130	76.88	−1.40
Mana Motuhake	Tikirau Stevens	1,282	9.72	
National	Jack Mei	1,030	7.81	+1.30
Democrats	Robert Aramakuru	344	2.61	+1.11
Independent	Dun Mihaka	319	2.42	+1.25
Independent	Clive Dooley	71	0.53	
Majority		8,848	67.15	−2.52
Turnout		13,176	68.96	−9.08
Registered electors		19,104		

=== 1984 election ===
1984 general election: Southern Maori
Party	Candidate	Votes	%	±%
Labour	Whetu Tirikatene-Sullivan	11,792	78.28	+6.64
Mana Motuhake	Amster Reedy	1,297	8.61	−3.05
National	Jack Mei	982	6.51	
NZ Party	Willard Amaru	427	2.83	
Social Credit	Robert Aramakuru	226	1.50	−6.20
Independent	Dun Mihaka	177	1.17	−0.70
Independent	Halverson Watene	161	1.06	
Majority		10,495	69.67	+9.70
Turnout		15,062	78.04	+4.90
Registered electors		19,300		

=== 1981 election ===
1981 general election: Southern Maori
Party	Candidate	Votes	%	±%
Labour	Whetu Tirikatene-Sullivan	10,685	71.64	−10.68
Mana Motuhake	Amster Reedy	1,740	11.66	
Social Credit	Robert Aramakuru	1,149	7.70	
National	Barry Kiwara	1,060	7.10	
Independent	Dun Mihaka	280	1.87	
Majority		8,945	59.97	−13.76
Turnout		14,914	73.14	+32.94
Registered electors		20,390		

=== 1978 election ===
1978 general election: Southern Maori
Party	Candidate	Votes	%	±%
Labour	Whetu Tirikatene-Sullivan	10,250	82.32	+7.72
National	Charles Piharo Maitai	1,070	8.59	
Social Credit	Waireti Ate Mangai Gregory	1,013	8.13	
Values	Martin Burdan	117	0.93	
Majority		9,180	73.73	+11.29
Turnout		12,450	40.20	−16.31
Registered electors		30,966		

=== 1975 election ===
1975 general election: Southern Maori
Party	Candidate	Votes	%	±%
Labour	Whetu Tirikatene-Sullivan	7,708	74.60	−13.06
National	Willard Amaru	1,256	12.15	
Social Credit	Lucy Kaumau	598	5.78	
Independent Labour	William Whareupoko Mohi	358	3.46	
Values	Wiki Cuirrie	246	2.38	
Independent	Te Puke Watson	166	1.60	
Majority		6,452	62.44	−26.89
Turnout		10,332	56.51	−14.79
Registered electors		18,282		

=== 1972 election ===
1972 general election: Southern Maori
Party	Candidate	Votes	%	±%
Labour	Whetu Tirikatene-Sullivan	9,078	87.66	+4.71
National	Kate Parahi	827	7.98	
Social Credit	Gale M. Ngakuru	450	4.34	
Majority		9,251	89.33	+18.84
Turnout		10,355	71.30	+0.81
Registered electors		14,522		

=== 1969 election ===
1969 general election: Southern Maori
Party	Candidate	Votes	%	±%
Labour	Whetu Tirikatene-Sullivan	7,802	82.95	+8.64
National	Norra Woodbane Pomare	1,172	12.46	
Social Credit	Tamati W. Makitanare	290	3.08	
Independent	Kenneth Rangi	141	1.49	
Majority		6,630	70.49	+16.69
Turnout		9,405	70.40	+19.93
Registered electors		13,359		

=== 1967 by-election ===
1967 Southern Maori by-election
Party	Candidate	Votes	%	±%
Labour	Whetu Tirikatene-Sullivan	4,968	74.31	
National	Baden Pere	1,371	20.51	−1.17
Social Credit	James Hugh MacDonald	347	5.18	−0.85
Majority		3,597	53.80	
Turnout		6,686	50.47	−12.21
Registered electors		13,248		

=== 1966 election ===
1966 general election: Southern Maori
Party	Candidate	Votes	%	±%
Labour	Eruera Tirikatene	5,474	72.28	−5.09
National	Baden Pere	1,642	21.68	
Social Credit	James Hugh MacDonald	457	6.03	
Majority		3,832	50.60	−12.91
Turnout		7,573	62.68	−7.37
Registered electors		12,081		

=== 1963 election ===
1963 general election: Southern Maori
Party	Candidate	Votes	%	±%
Labour	Eruera Tirikatene	6,065	77.37	+1.80
National	Ben Couch	1,087	13.86	
Young Maori	Rua Bristowe	387	4.93	
Social Credit	Matua Ereatara Niania	299	3.81	
Majority		4,978	63.51	+5.39
Turnout		7,838	70.05	−1.21
Registered electors		11,189		

=== 1960 election ===
1960 general election: Southern Maori
Party	Candidate	Votes	%	±%
Labour	Eruera Tirikatene	5,132	75.57	−2.95
National	Rangi Tutaki	1,185	17.44	
Social Credit	Matua Ereatara Niania	474	6.97	
Majority		3,947	58.12	−6.39
Turnout		6,791	71.26	−11.19
Registered electors		9,529		

=== 1957 election ===
1957 general election: Southern Maori
Party	Candidate	Votes	%	±%
Labour	Eruera Tirikatene	5,335	78.52	+14.43
National	Thomas Stratton	952	14.01	
Social Credit	Hinerapa Ihipera Ropiha	394	5.79	
Kauhananui	Tamati Wi Makitanare	113	1.66	
Majority		4,383	64.51	+23.28
Turnout		6,794	82.45	−10.33
Registered electors		8,240		

=== 1954 election ===
1954 general election: Southern Maori
Party	Candidate	Votes	%	±%
Labour	Eruera Tirikātene	4,452	64.09	−11.27
National	Turi Carroll	1,588	22.86	
Independent Labour	Rangi Logan	477	6.86	
Social Credit	Matenga Baker	261	3.75	
Maori Labour	A T Huata	168	2.41	
Majority		2,864	41.23	−9.50
Turnout		6,946	92.78	+1.95
Registered electors		7,486		

=== 1951 election ===
1951 general election: Southern Maori
Party	Candidate	Votes	%	±%
Labour	Eruera Tirikātene	979	75.36	−0.89
National	William Beaton	320	24.63	
Majority		659	50.73	−3.27
Turnout		1,299	90.83	−3.04
Registered electors		1,430		

=== 1949 election ===
1949 general election: Southern Maori
Party	Candidate	Votes	%	±%
Labour	Eruera Tirikātene	970	76.25	+1.71
National	Huro Nathanial Bates	283	22.24	
Informal votes		19	1.49	+0.28
Majority		687	54.00	+3.70
Turnout		1,272	93.87	
Registered electors		1,355		

=== 1946 election ===
1946 general election: Southern Maori
Party	Candidate	Votes	%	±%
Labour	Eruera Tirikātene	861	74.54	
National	Vernon Ohaia Mason Thomas	280	24.24	
Informal votes		14	1.21	
Majority		581	50.30	
Turnout		1,155		

=== 1932 by-election ===
1932 Southern Maori by-election
Party	Candidate	Votes	%	±%
Ratana	Eruera Tirikātene	425	44.69	+10.34
United/Reform	William Teihoka Parata	184	19.35	
Independent	Peter McDonald	132	13.88	
Independent	Joseph Beaton (United–Reform Coalition)	113	11.88	
Independent	Tame Bragg (Reform)	94	9.88	
Independent	Wiremu Mihaka	3	0.32	
Majority		241	25.34	+23.27
Turnout		951		

=== 1931 election ===
1931 general election: Southern Maori
Party	Candidate	Votes	%	±%
United	Tuiti Makitānara	334	36.42	
Ratana	Eruera Tirikātene	315	34.35	
Independent	Hari Wi Katene	268	29.23	
Majority		19	2.07	
Turnout		917		

=== 1922 by-election ===
1922 Southern Maori by-election
Party	Candidate	Votes	%	±%
Reform	Henare Uru	364	44.83	
Independent	Teone Matapura Erihana	250	30.79	+16.69
Independent	Weretā Tainui Pītama	108	13.30	
Independent	Bill Barrett	90	11.08	
Turnout		812		
Majority		114	14.04	−16.05

=== 1918 by-election ===
1918 Southern Maori by-election
Party	Candidate	Votes	%	±%
Independent	Hopere Uru	242	38.78	
Independent	Henare Parata	223	35.74	
Independent	Teone Matapura Erihana (Ellison)	159	25.48	
Turnout		624		
Majority		19	3.04	

=== 1899 election ===
1899 general election: Southern Maori
Party	Candidate	Votes	%	±%
Liberal	Tame Parata	387	63.86	+24.64
	Taituha Hape	219	36.14	
Majority		168	27.72	+10.81
Turnout		606		

=== 1896 election ===
1896 general election: Southern Maori
Party	Candidate	Votes	%	±%
Liberal	Tame Parata	262	39.22	−27.63
	Thomas Ellison	149	22.31	
	Riki Te Mairaki Taiaroa	144	21.56	
	Teoti Pita Mutu	113	16.92	−16.24
Majority		391	11.93	−16.78
Turnout		668		

=== 1893 election ===
1893 general election: Southern Maori
Party	Candidate	Votes	%	±%
Liberal	Tame Parata	367	66.85	
	Teoti Pita Mutu	182	33.15	
Majority		185	33.70	
Turnout		549		

=== 1887 election ===
1887 general election: Southern Maori
Party	Candidate	Votes	%	±%
Independent	Tame Parata	140	33.49	−9.12
Independent	Thomas Ellison	103	24.64	
Independent	Kahu	103	24.64	
Independent	Hōne Taare Tīkao	72	17.22	−10.03
Majority		37	8.85	−3.61
Turnout		418		

=== 1885 by-election ===
1885 Southern Maori by-election
Party	Candidate	Votes	%	±%
Independent	Tame Parata	147	42.61	
Independent	Henare Paratini	104	30.14	
Independent	Hone Taare Tikao	94	27.25	
Majority		43	12.46	
Turnout		345		

=== 1879 by-election ===
1879 Southern Maori by-election
Party	Candidate	Votes	%	±%
Independent	Ihaia Tainui	191	49.23	
Independent	Tari Wi or Toihaka	78	20.10	
Independent	Hori Paratene	60	15.46	
Majority		113	29.12	
Turnout		388		
