= Taare Parata =

NZ politician (1865-1918)

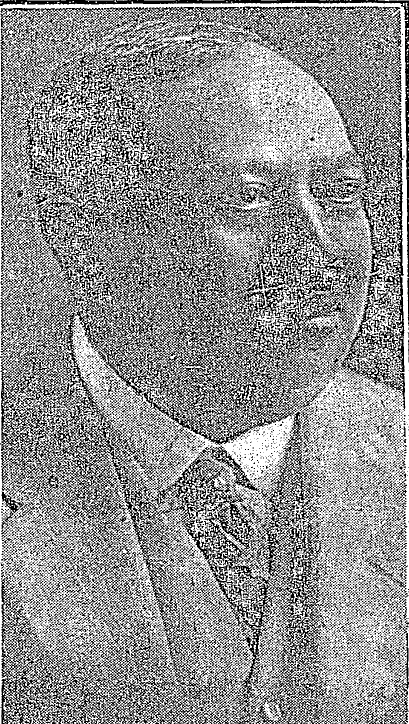

Member of the New Zealand Parliament for Southern Maori
- In office 19 December 1911 – 8 January 1918
- Preceded by: Tame Parata
- Succeeded by: Hopere Uru

Personal details
- Born: 1865 Puketeraki, near Karitane, New Zealand
- Died: 8 January 1918 (aged 52–53) Wellington, New Zealand
- Spouse: Katherine Te Rongokahira Asher (m. 1896)
- Relations: Ned Parata (brother); Albert Asher (brother-in-law); Ernie Asher (brother-in-law); John Atirau Asher (brother-in law)
- Parent: Tame Parata (father)

Taare Rakatauhake Parata (1865 – 8 January 1918), also known as Charles Rere Parata, was a Māori and a Liberal Party Member of Parliament in New Zealand.

New Zealand Parliament
Years	Term	Electorate	Party
1911–1914	18th	Southern Maori	Liberal
1914–1918	19th	Southern Maori	Liberal

Parata was born at Puketeraki near Karitane in 1865, the son of Tame Parata (later the MP for Southern Maori) and his wife Peti Hurene, also known as Elizabeth Brown. He affiliated to the Ngāi Tahu, Kāti Māmoe and Waitaha iwi (tribes). His paternal grandfather was Captain Pratt, a whaler from Massachusetts. He received his education at Dunedin Normal School.

In 1896, Parata was a working for the Native Land Court as a clerk and licensed interpreter. On 15 June of that year in Tauranga he married Katherine Te Rongokahira Asher, who belonged to the Te Arawa tribe. She was the daughter of a Jewish trader, David Asher, and granddaughter of Asher Asher, the first captain of the Auckland Fire Brigade. Her brothers included rugby players Albert Asher and Ernie Asher. Another brother, John Atirau Asher, came to live with Te Rongokahira and Charles Parata in Wellington in about 1906. The couple had one daughter and two sons of their own.

Charles and Te Rongokahira Parata were among the leaders of "progressive" Māori society and strongly supported the manifesto of what become the Young Māori Party. They often spent time in Wellington, and moved there permanently in 1905. Parata left his position with the Native Land Court and joined William Moffatt in business as land and estate agents, interpreters and native agents; Moffatt running the Palmerston North branch and Parata the head office in Wellington.

Following his father's elevation to the Legislative Council in 1911, Parata succeeded his father as Member of Parliament for the Southern Maori electorate in the 1911 general election, and he held the seat until 1918, when he died in Wellington. His body was returned to Puketeraki for burial.

New Zealand Parliament
Preceded by Tame Parata	Member of Parliament for Southern Maori; 1911–1918	Succeeded by Hopere Uru
