= Ned Parata =

NZ rugby union administrator (1879-1949)

Wiremu Teihoka "Ned" Parata OBE (c.1879 – 23 February 1949) was a New Zealand rugby union administrator.

Of Ngāi Tahu descent, Parata was born at Puketeraki, near Karitane. He was the youngest son of Tame Parata and younger brother of Taare Parata. Educated at Te Aute College, Parata became a rugby union administrator after his playing days were ended by serious illness. He organised the first official New Zealand Māori rugby team in 1910 and managed the side on its tour of Australia. He underwrote the cost of touring with the profits from his motor car business. He subsequently managed the team on tours to Australia in 1913, 1922 and 1923. He also managed the team on their 1926–27 tour of New Zealand, Australia, Ceylon, France, England, Wales and Canada.

In 1911, Parata became the first president of the Bay of Plenty Rugby Union, a position he held until 1925. He served on the New Zealand Rugby Management Committee between 1922 and 1926 in his capacity as president of the Māori Advisory Board. In 1943 he was the first Māori to be made a life member of the New Zealand Rugby Union.

Parata stood for election to the New Zealand parliament as the United/Reform Coalition candidate in the 1932 Southern Maori by-election. He was unsuccessful, finishing a distant second behind the Ratana candidate Eruera Tirikatene.

In the 1948 King's Birthday Honours, Parata was appointed an Officer of the Order of the British Empire for services to the Māori people.

Parata died at Seacliff Hospital near Dunedin in 1949.
