= Eruera Tirikātene =

New Zealand politician

The Honourable Sir Eruera Tirikātene KCMG
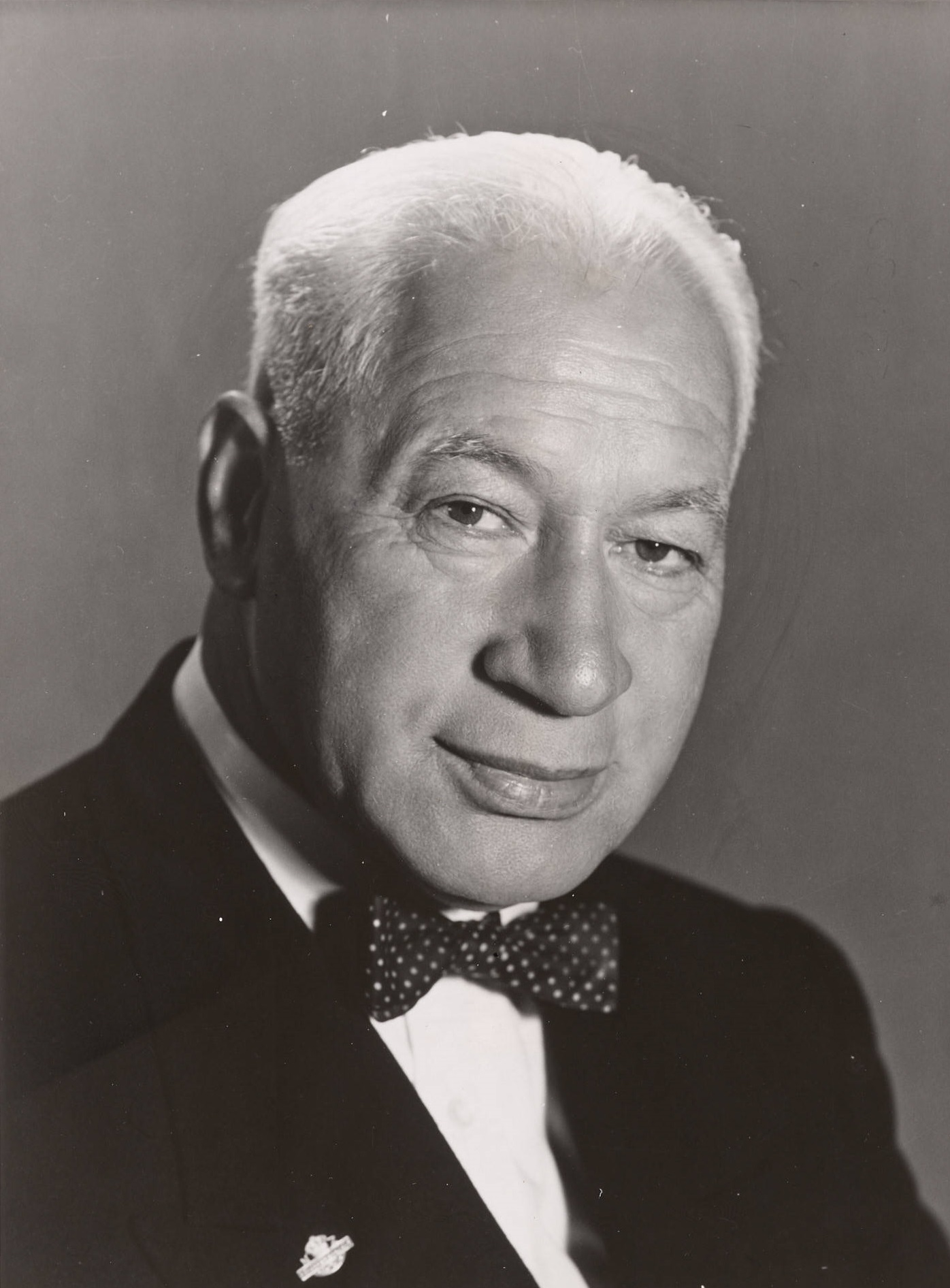
- Tirikātene in c.1950s

16th Minister of Forests
- In office 12 December 1957 – 12 December 1960
- Prime Minister: Walter Nash
- Preceded by: Geoff Gerard
- Succeeded by: Geoff Gerard

Minister without portfolio
- In office 26 May 1943 – 13 December 1949
- Prime Minister: Peter Fraser

Member of the New Zealand Parliament for Southern Maori
- In office 3 August 1932 – 11 January 1967
- Preceded by: Tuiti Makitānara
- Succeeded by: Whetu Tirikatene-Sullivan

Personal details
- Born: 5 January 1895 Te Rakiwhakaputa pā, Kaiapoi, New Zealand
- Died: 11 January 1967 (aged 72) Kaiapoi, New Zealand
- Resting place: Te Kai A Te Atua Urupa, Kaiapoi
- Party: Labour
- Other political affiliations: Rātana
- Spouse: Ruti Matekino Solomon
- Relations: Whetu Tirikatene-Sullivan (daughter); Rino Tirikatene (grandson)
- Children: 12

Sir Eruera Tihema Te Āika Tirikātene KCMG (5 January 1895 – 11 January 1967) was a New Zealand Māori politician of Ngāi Tahu descent. Known in early life as Edward James Te Āika Tregerthen, he was the first Rātana Member of Parliament and was elected in a by-election for Southern Maori in June 1932 after the death of Tuiti Makitānara.

He remained the MP until his death in 1967, when his daughter Whetu Tirikatene-Sullivan succeeded to the seat, also in a by-election.

== Early life ==
After education at St Stephen's Anglican Church, Tirikātene worked on farms before enlisting in 1914 for the First World War. He served three years with the New Zealand Māori (Pioneer) Battalion, reaching the rank of sergeant, and was commended for carrying a wounded soldier while under fire.

In 1919, he was married to Ruti Matekino Solomon and the couple went on to have twelve children. In the same year, he settled on a small farm near Kaiapoi, where he also set up a dairy farm, a saw mill, a fishing fleet and a ferry service. During the Second World War in 1944 their second son, Sergeant Pilot John Aperehama, aged 21, was killed in an aircraft accident in Auckland. He was buried at Te Kai A Te Atua Urupā, Kaiapoi.

By 1921 he visited Rātana pā, and T. W. Ratana, the spiritual leader or Te Mangai of Rātana, predicted an important role for him. Te Mangai persuaded him to stay, and with his practical skills, served the movement by taking charge of the harvesting of Rātana lands.

== Election to Parliament ==
As the Rātana movement developed into a political movement, Eruera Tirikātene became a leader in the internal political council and stood for parliament in the 1928 and 1931 elections, being defeated narrowly in both. In 1928 he and most of his extended family spent the election at Rātana Pā helping with the wheat harvest. At the time there were few provisions for absentee voting, and unable to even vote for himself, Tirikātene lost the election by one vote.

In June 1932, the sitting MP for Southern Maori, Tuiti Makitānara died suddenly and Eruera won the by-election to become the first Rātana MP. Tirikātene continued to represent his electorate until his death in January 1967. His initial majorities were small, only 43 in 1935.

== Member of Parliament ==
New Zealand Parliament
Years	Term	Electorate	Party
1932–1935	24th	Southern Maori	Rātana
1935–1936	25th	Southern Maori	Rātana
1936–1938	Changed allegiance to:		Labour
1938–1943	26th	Southern Maori	Labour
1943–1946	27th	Southern Maori	Labour
1946–1949	28th	Southern Maori	Labour
1949–1951	29th	Southern Maori	Labour
1951–1954	30th	Southern Maori	Labour
1954–1957	31st	Southern Maori	Labour
1957–1960	32nd	Southern Maori	Labour
1960–1963	33rd	Southern Maori	Labour
1963–1966	34th	Southern Maori	Labour
1966–1967	35th	Southern Maori	Labour

From his maiden speech, Tirikātene made recognition of the Treaty of Waitangi one of his major aims, presenting a petition with over 30,000 signatures. The petition from the Rātana morehu was held over for thirteen years before being virtually ignored, but Tirikātene continued to raise the Treaty issue in debates.

During the depression of that time, Māori were expected to subsist from their land, and were not given equal access to unemployment payments and relief work. Proving entitlement to the old age pension was also more difficult for Māori, as Māori did not have to register births until 1919. Tirikātene spoke out against this discrimination in social welfare which caused poverty to Māori and the removal of this inequality by the Labour Government strengthened the Labour and Rātana bond.

Following the Rātana-Labour alliance, Tirikātene became the First President of the Labour Party Māori Advisory Council, a committee to set Māori policy for the party. During the Second World War, Tirikātene set up and led the Māori War Effort Organisation. The experience of Māori running their own affairs led him to introduce the Māori Social and Economic Advancement Act of 1945, but it did not give the independence for iwi he had hoped for.

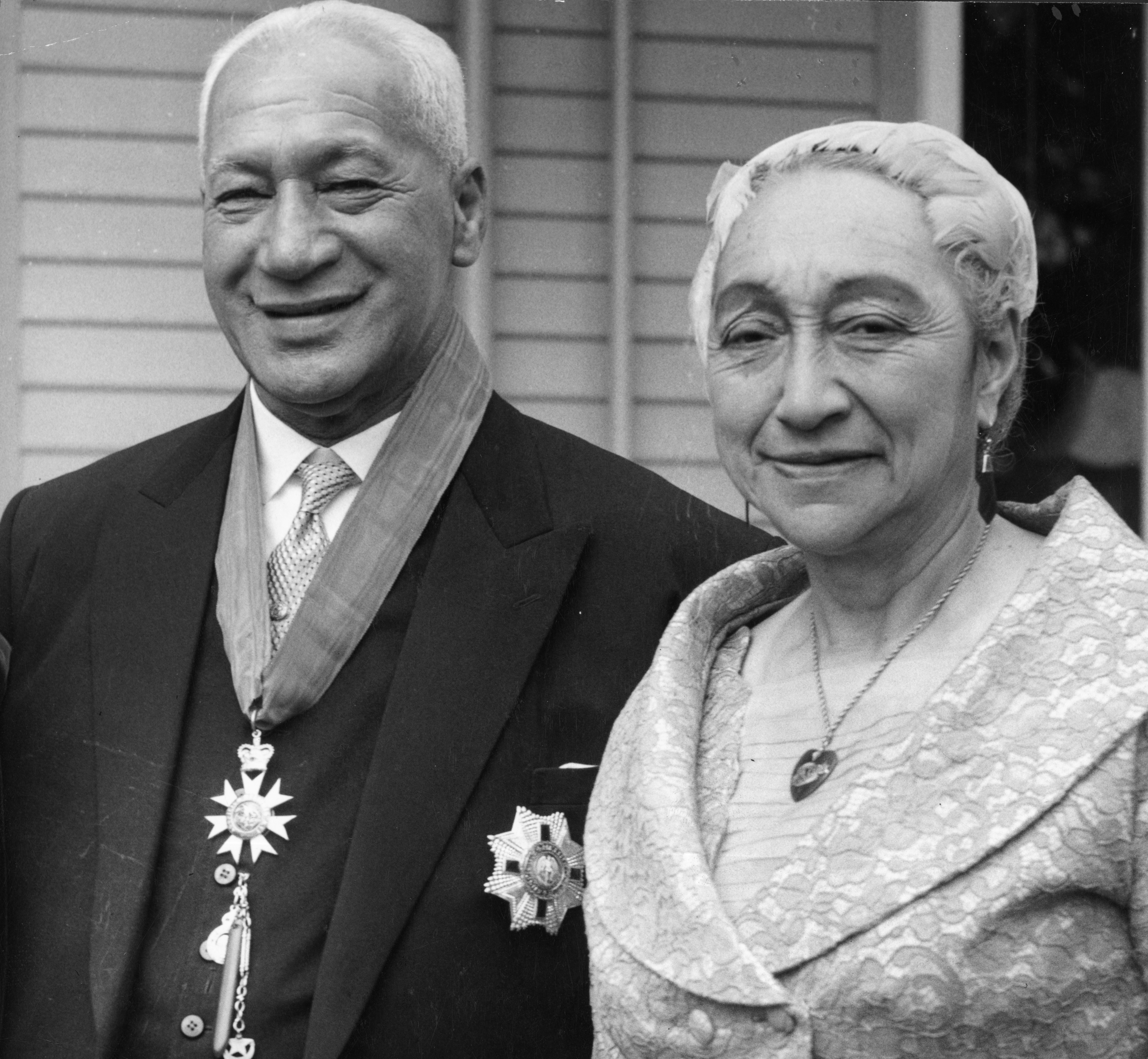
Sir Eruera, Minister of Forests, with Lady Tirikātene, in October 1960, shortly after he was knighted. He is wearing the insignia of the Knight Commander of the Order of Saint Michael and Saint George.

Between 1946 and 1949, Tirikātene was involved in land claim settlements for Waikato—Maniapoto and Taranaki. He persuaded the Ngāi Tahu to accept the Ngaitahu Claim Settlement Act of 1944 and became president of the Ngaitahu Trust Board.

After a period in opposition, he was appointed Minister of Forests, and Minister in charge of Printing and Stationery. Tirikātene was expecting Māori Affairs, which was taken by Prime Minister Walter Nash. The two often clashed, with Tirikātene wanting greater autonomy for Māori. One achievement of this period was the official recognition of Waitangi Day through the Waitangi Day Act 1960, commemorating the signing of Te Tiriti o Waitangi.

Tirikātene continued committee work while in opposition after 1960, and remained an MP until his death. He was succeeded in the seat by his daughter, Whetu Tirikatene-Sullivan.

== Recognition ==
In 1935, Tirikātene was awarded the King George V Silver Jubilee Medal. In 1953, he was awarded the Queen Elizabeth II Coronation Medal. He was appointed a Knight Commander of the Order of St Michael and St George in the 1960 Queen's Birthday Honours. Within the Rātana movement, he was known as Te Ōmeka.

Political offices
Preceded by Geoff Gerard	Minister of Forests; 1957–1960	Succeeded by Geoff Gerard
New Zealand Parliament
Preceded by Tuiti Makitānara	Member of Parliament for Southern Maori; 1932–1967	Succeeded by Whetu Tirikatene-Sullivan
