= Tini Taiaroa =

Ngai Tahu; founding mother, community worker (1846–1934)

Tini Kerei Taiaroa (born Jane Burns, and later known as Tini Pana; died 4 September 1934) was the wife of Hōri Kerei Taiaroa. Of Māori descent, she identified with the Ngāi Tahu iwi. She was born at Moeraki, New Zealand, probably in 1846 or 47.
