= Te Mātenga Taiaroa =

Māori leader of the Ngāi Tahi iwi (tribe)

Te Mātenga Taiaroa (c. 1795 – 2 February 1863) was a leader of Ngāi Tahu, a Māori iwi (tribe) of the South Island of New Zealand. Taiaroa belonged to Ngāi Te Ruahikihiki and Ngāti Moki hapū of Ngāi Tahu, which were centred on Taumutu, at the southern end of Lake Ellesmere / Te Waihora. From the 1830s to the 1860s, he was a leader at Ōtākou on the Otago Peninsula in association with his cousin Karetai. In the 1830s, he fought against Te Rauparaha and Ngāti Toa, sometimes in conjunction with Tūhawaiki. He was later involved in peacemaking with Ngāti Toa. In 1856 he attended the meeting of Māori chiefs at Pūkawa, Lake Taupō, which elected Pōtatau Te Wherowhero as the first Māori King. In 1860 he attended the Kohimarama conference of Māori chiefs in Auckland, organised by the government. In 1859 Taiaroa was baptised by a Methodist minister and took the Christian name of Te Mātenga (Marsden). Hōri Kerei Taiaroa was one of his children.
