= Hōri Kerei Taiaroa =

New Zealand politician (died 1905)

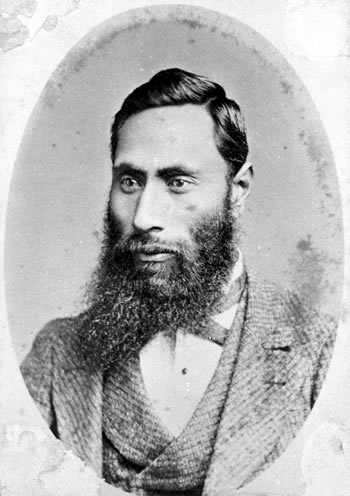

Member of the New Zealand Parliament for Southern Maori
- In office 1871–1879
- Preceded by: John Patterson
- Succeeded by: Ihaia Tainui

Member of the New Zealand Parliament for Southern Maori
- In office 1881–1885
- Preceded by: Ihaia Tainui
- Succeeded by: Tame Parata

Personal details
- Born: 1830s or early 1840s Ōtākou, New Zealand
- Died: 4 August 1905 Wellington, New Zealand
- Spouse: Tini Pana (Jane Burns)
- Relations: Te Mātenga Taiaroa (father); John Taiaroa (son); Dick Taiaroa (son)

Hōri Kerei Taiaroa (born 1830s or early 1840s – 4 August 1905), also known as Huriwhenua, was a Māori member of the New Zealand parliament and the paramount chief of the southern iwi of Ngāi Tahu. The son of Ngāi Tahu leader Te Mātenga Taiaroa and Mawera Taiaroa, he was born at Ōtākou on the Otago Peninsula in the 1830s or early 1840s.

New Zealand Parliament
Years	Term	Electorate	Party
1871–1875	5th	Southern Maori	Independent
1876–1879	6th	Southern Maori	Independent
1881	7th	Southern Maori	Independent
1881–1884	8th	Southern Maori	Independent
1884–1885	9th	Southern Maori	Independent

He represented the Southern Maori electorate from 1871 to February 1879, when he was appointed to the Legislative Council. He was disqualified from the Legislative Council in August 1880 over a technicality, which caused bitterness and resentment among Māori.

When appointed by Sir George Grey, Taiaroa held (and continued to hold) a salaried (government) office, hence was not eligible to sit in the council, despite having attended three sessions. He was drawing a salary as a Native Assessor and it was suggested that a Validation Act would have been passed for a European member in that situation.

In 1881 Ihaia Tainui who had held the electorate since 1879 resigned so that Taiaroa could resume the electorate. Taiaroa then held the electorate from 1881 to 1885 when he was again appointed to the Legislative Council, where he served for 20 years until his death.

Taiaroa was active in pursuing Ngāi Tahu land claims in Parliament.

Taiaroa's son John Taiaroa played for the All Blacks in their 1884 tour of New South Wales and went on to work as a lawyer in Hastings.

New Zealand Parliament
Preceded by John Patterson	Member of Parliament for Southern Maori; 1871–1879; 1881–1885	Succeeded by Ihaia Tainui
Preceded by Ihaia Tainui	Member of Parliament for Southern Maori; 1871–1879; 1881–1885	Succeeded by Tame Parata
