= Tame Parata =

New Zealand politician

The Honourable Tame Parata
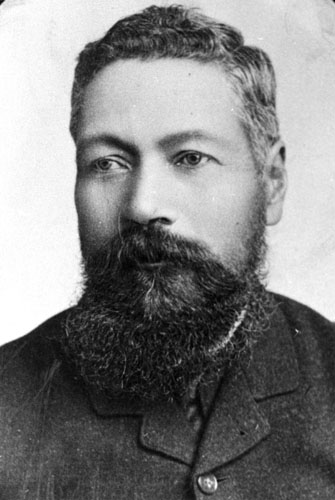
- Parata, c. 1888

Member of the New Zealand Parliament for Southern Maori
- In office 1885–1911
- Preceded by: Hōri Kerei Taiaroa
- Succeeded by: Taare Parata

Personal details
- Born: c.1837 Ruapuke Island, New Zealand
- Died: 6 March 1917 Puketeraki, near Karitane, New Zealand
- Spouse: Peti Hurene (Elizabeth Brown)
- Children: Taare Parata; Ned Parata
- Relatives: Hekia Parata (great-great-granddaughter)

Tame Parata (c. 1837 – 6 March 1917), also known as Thomas Pratt, was a Māori and a Liberal Party Member of Parliament in New Zealand.

New Zealand Parliament
Years	Term	Electorate	Party
1885–1887	9th	Southern Maori	Independent
1887–1890	10th	Southern Maori	Independent
1890–1893	11th	Southern Maori	Liberal
1893–1896	12th	Southern Maori	Liberal
1896–1899	13th	Southern Maori	Liberal
1899–1902	14th	Southern Maori	Liberal
1902–1905	15th	Southern Maori	Liberal
1905–1908	16th	Southern Maori	Liberal
1908–1911	17th	Southern Maori	Liberal

Parata was born on Ruapuke Island in Foveaux Strait. His father was a Captain Trapp, a whaler from Massachusetts, and his mother was Koroteke of the Ngāi Tahu, Kāti Māmoe and Waitaha iwi (tribes). It is said that Tame reversed his father's name to Pratt, and transliterated it to Parata in Māori.

He won the Southern Maori electorate in the 1885 by-election after the resignation of Hōri Kerei Taiaroa, and held it to 1911, when he retired; he was succeeded in the electorate by his youngest son, Taare Parata. Subsequently, on 13 June 1912 Parata Sr was appointed to the New Zealand Legislative Council, where he sat until he died on 6 March 1917. Hekia Parata, a former member of Parliament, is his great-great-granddaughter. New Zealand academic and playwright John Broughton is his great-grandson.

== Notes ==
New Zealand Parliament
Preceded by Hōri Kerei Taiaroa	Member of Parliament for Southern Maori; 1885–1911	Succeeded by Taare Parata
