= List of electoral firsts in New Zealand =

List of electoral firsts in New Zealand lists members of the New Zealand Parliament who are notable for age (oldest or youngest) or length of service or by being the “first” for a group e.g. women, Māori, ethnic minorities or LGBT people.

The list is mainly for the House of Representatives rather than the former upper house (the Legislative Council, which was abolished in 1951), and may include the second and third people to attain a position also. Where a source is not given, the source may be the article on the MP.

Members of the House of Representatives are now referred to as "Members of Parliament" (MPs). Until 1907 they were designated "M.H.R." (Members of the House of Representatives). With Dominion status members were designated "M.P." by a Royal Proclamation of 10 September.

== Length of service and age ==
=== Age when first elected ===
The youngest MP elected was James Stuart-Wortley, who was 20 years and 258 days when elected in 1853; see Baby of the House for full list. The present "Baby of the House" is Hana-Rawhiti Maipi-Clarke, 21 when first elected.
In the later 20th-century Marilyn Waring was younger than Mike Moore and Simon Upton; all aged 23 years when they were first elected.

=== Age when retired or left ===
- Walter Nash died as an MP (having retired as party leader) aged 86 years, and was probably the oldest person to be a serving MP when he died.

=== Longest-serving MPs ===
- Rex Mason was New Zealand's longest serving MP, 40 years from 1926 to 1966.
- Keith Holyoake was probably New Zealand's second-longest serving MP and longest-serving prime minister, 39 years from 1932 to 1938 and 1943 to 1977.
- Walter Nash was probably New Zealand's third-longest serving MP, 38 years from 1929 to 1968.
- Annette King was New Zealand's longest-serving female MP, 30 years between 1984–90 and 1993–2017.
- Whetu Tirikatene-Sullivan was New Zealand's longest-serving female Maori MP, 29 years between 1967 and 1996.

=== Shortest-serving MP ===
The MP with the shortest period of service is possibly Henry Jackson who served in 1879 from 2 July to 15 August; from the 1879 by-election to the 1879 general election. Jackson was sworn in on 11 July 1879 and parliament sat until 11 August. Another person with a short tenure was William Cutfield King, who won election for the Grey and Bell electorate in the general election held on 27 November 1860. King was killed in the First Taranaki War on 8 February 1861, several months before parliament would next resume. Hence, King was never sworn in.

=== Prime minister ===
The longest-serving prime minister is Richard Seddon at 13 years and 44 days; see List of prime ministers of New Zealand by time in office.
See also: List of prime ministers of New Zealand by age and List of prime ministers of New Zealand by date of birth.

=== Father of the House ===
The current Father of the House is Gerry Brownlee, who has served continuously since 1996, while the current Mother of the House is Judith Collins, who has served continuously since 2002.

== New Zealand-born ==
- John Sheehan was the first New Zealand-born Member of Parliament elected by a general (rather than a Māori) electorate and he was the first New Zealand-born person to hold cabinet rank. Born in Auckland in 1844, he became an MP in 1872 and a cabinet minister in 1877.
- Francis Bell was the first New Zealand-born Prime Minister, holding office for only 16 days in a caretaker capacity from 14 to 30 May 1925; from the death of William Massey until the appointment of Gordon Coates (also born in New Zealand).

== Women ==
- 1893 was the first election in which women could vote, with only ten weeks notice to enrol. Premier Richard Seddon attempted to block the legislation in the upper house, and John Hall (who proposed the bill) received much of the credit; see Women's suffrage in New Zealand.
- 1919 was the first election in which women could stand as candidates, and three women stood at short (three weeks) notice although none were elected. They were Rosetta Baume, Aileen Cooke and Ellen Melville.
- 1933: Elizabeth McCombs was the first woman MP; followed by Catherine Stewart (1938; the first elected at a general election and not by widow's succession), Mary Dreaver (1941), Mary Grigg (1942), Mabel Howard (1943), Hilda Ross (1945), Iriaka Rātana (1949, the first woman Māori MP), Ethel McMillan (1953), Esme Tombleson (1960), Rona Stevenson (1963), Whetu Tirikatene-Sullivan (1967), Mary Batchelor and Dorothy Jelicich (both 1972). Mary Grigg, Hilda Ross, Esme Tombleson and Rona Stevenson represented the National Party, the others were from the Labour Party. (Note: Marilyn Waring and Colleen Dewe, elected for National in 1975, were at the time of their election, only the fourteenth and fifteenth women elected as a Member of Parliament in New Zealand.)
- 1946: Mary Anderson and Mary Dreaver were the first women appointed to the New Zealand Legislative Council.
- 1947: Mabel Howard was the first woman cabinet minister (for Health and Child Welfare).
- 1948: Mary Anderson became the first woman to chair a New Zealand parliamentary committee.
- 1949: Iriaka Rātana became the first MP to give birth.
- 1970: Whetu Tirikatene-Sullivan became the first (both in New Zealand and the Commonwealth) cabinet minister to give birth to a child.
- 1989: Helen Clark became the first woman Deputy Prime Minister and deputy leader of a political party.
- 1993: Helen Clark became the first woman to lead a political party, and first Leader of the opposition.
- 1997: Jenny Shipley became the first woman Prime Minister (from 1997 to 1999), replacing Jim Bolger.
- 1999: After the 1999 election, Helen Clark became prime minister, so could be called the first "elected" woman New Zealand prime minister.
- 2005: Margaret Wilson was the first woman Speaker of the House.

== Māori ==
- 1868: The first Māori elections selected four MPs for the new Māori seats: Tāreha Te Moananui, Mete Kīngi Paetahi, John Patterson and Frederick Nene Russell.
- 1872: Mōkena Kōhere and Wi Tako Ngātata were the first Māori appointed to the Legislative Council.
- 1893: Sir James Carroll was the first Māori elected to a general seat. The next were Rex Austin and Ben Couch in 1975.
- 1897: Carroll was the first Māori cabinet minister; acting minister in 1897, then appointed in 1899. He was acting prime minister in 1909 and 1911.
- 1949: Iriaka Rātana was the first woman Māori MP.
- 1972: Whetu Tirikatene-Sullivan was the first Māori woman cabinet minister.
- 1993: Peter Tapsell was the first Māori Speaker of the House.

== Other ethnic minorities ==
Since the introduction of mixed-member proportional representation (MMP) in 1996, a number of people from ethnic minorities (other than Māori) have been selected by their party for the party list (some came into parliament between elections to replace a retiring list MP).

- 1873: Sir Julius Vogel was the first Jewish premier or prime minister (possibly the first practicing Jew to head a government; see lists of Jews in politics and list of Oceanian Jews)
- 1963: Ron Ng-Waishing became the first person of Asian descent to stand for Parliament, for Labour in Franklin.
- 1993: Taito Phillip Field (born in Samoa) was the first Pasifika and Samoan MP.
- 1995: Rob Allen became the first Pasifika general secretary of a political party.
- 1996: Pansy Wong (born in China) was the first Asian MP.
- 1999: Mark Gosche became the first Pasifika Cabinet Minister.
- 2002: Ashraf Choudhary became the first Pakistani MP
- 2008: Kanwaljit Singh Bakshi was the first Indian and first Sikh MP
- 2008: Rajen Prasad became the first Indo-Fijian MP
- 2017: Golriz Ghahraman was the first MP to have been a refugee.

== LGBT people ==
- 1993: Chris Carter was the first "openly gay" MP in New Zealand, and became a minister in 2002. He was followed by Tim Barnett who became an MP in 1996 (see LGBT in New Zealand).
- 1999: Georgina Beyer was the first openly transsexual MP and the first MP to have been a sex worker.
- 2011: Grant Robertson was the first openly gay deputy leader of a political party.
- 2020: Grant Robertson was the first openly gay Deputy Prime Minister of New Zealand.

== People with disabilities ==
- 1921: Clutha Mackenzie elected; he had been blinded at Gallipoli in World War I.
- 1922: John A. Lee elected (by defeating Clutha McKenzie in Auckland East); Lee was an amputee who had lost an arm in World War I.
- 1925: William Downie Stewart Jr became the first MP who used a wheelchair.
- 1943: Geoffrey Sim elected; he lost an eye and arm and the use of a leg in World War II.
- 1949: Leon Götz elected; he lost an eye and arm in World War I.
- 1975: Norman Jones elected; he lost his right leg in World War II.
- 1999: Margaret Wilson elected; she was also a leg amputee.
- 2011: Mojo Mathers elected, the first deaf MP.

== Former or future United Kingdom MPs ==
- 1890: William Shepherd Allen was the first to be elected to the New Zealand Parliament after serving in the United Kingdom House of Commons between 1865 and 1886.
- 1900: Cathcart Wason was the first former member of the New Zealand House of Representatives to be elected as a Westminster MP.
- 1910: William Chapple was the first New Zealand-born Member of the UK Parliament. He was born in Alexandra, Central Otago.

== See also ==
- List of electoral firsts in Canada
- List of electoral firsts in the United Kingdom
- List of the first female holders of political offices in Oceania
