= New Zealand House of Representatives =

Sole chamber of the New Zealand Parliament

House of Representatives
- 54th Parliament (dissolved)

Type
- Type: Unicameral house of the New Zealand Parliament

History
- Founded: 24 May 1854 (first sitting)

Leadership
- Speaker: Gerry Brownlee, National since 5 December 2023
- Deputy Speaker: Barbara Kuriger, National since 6 December 2023
- Prime Minister: Christopher Luxon, National since 27 November 2023
- Leader of the House: Louise Upston, National since 7 April 2026
- Leader of the Opposition: Chris Hipkins, Labour since 27 November 2023
- Shadow Leader of the House: Kieran McAnulty, Labour since 30 November 2023

Structure
- Seats: 123
- Political groups: Outgoing legislature Government (68): National (49); ACT (11); NZ First (8); Official Opposition (34): Labour (34); Crossbench (21): Green (15); Māori (5); Independent (1)
- Political groups: Incoming legislature: National (42); Labour (36); Green (16); ACT (13); NZ First (12); Opportunity (7); Māori (5)
- Committees: 20 select committees
- Length of term: Up to three years
- Salary: NZ$168,600

Elections
- Voting system: Mixed-member proportional representation
- First election: 14 July – 1 October 1853
- Last election: 7 November 2026
- Next election: 2029

Meeting place
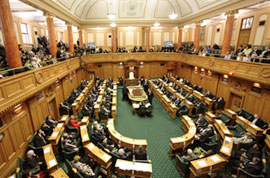
- Debating chamber, Parliament House, Wellington

Website
- www.parliament.nz

Rules
- Standing Orders of the House of Representatives

The House of Representatives is the sole chamber of the New Zealand Parliament. The House passes laws, provides ministers to form the Cabinet, and supervises the work of government. It is also responsible for adopting the state's budgets and approving the state's accounts.

The House of Representatives is a democratic body consisting of representatives known as members of parliament (MPs). There are normally 120 MPs, though there are currently 123 due to overhang seats. Elections take place usually every three years using a mixed-member proportional representation system, which combines first-past-the-post elected seats with closed party lists. 72 MPs are elected directly in single-member electoral districts and further seats are filled by list MPs based on each party's share of the party vote. A government may be formed from the single party or coalition of parties that has the support of a majority of MPs. If no majority is possible, a minority government can be formed with a confidence and supply arrangement. If a government is unable to maintain the confidence of the House then an early general election can be called.

The House of Representatives was created by the New Zealand Constitution Act 1852 (effective 1853), an act of the British Parliament, which established a bicameral legislature; the upper chamber, the Legislative Council, was abolished in 1950. Parliament received full control over all New Zealand affairs in 1947 with the passage of the Statute of Westminster Adoption Act. The debating chamber of the House of Representatives is located inside Parliament House in Wellington, the capital city. Sittings of the House are usually open to the public, but the House may at any time vote to sit in private. Proceedings are broadcast through Parliament TV and the AM Network.

== Constitutional function ==
The New Zealand House of Representatives takes the British House of Commons as its model. The New Zealand Parliament is based, in practice, on the Westminster system (that is, the procedures of the British Parliament). As a democratic institution, the primary role of the House of Representatives is to provide representation for the people and to pass legislation on behalf of the people (see § Passage of legislation).

The House of Representatives also plays an important role in responsible government. The New Zealand Government (that is, the executive), directed by the Cabinet, draws its membership exclusively from the House. A government is formed when a party or coalition can show that it has the "confidence" of the House, meaning the support of a majority of members of parliament. This can involve making agreements among several parties. Some may join a coalition government, while others may stay outside the government but agree to support it on confidence votes. The prime minister (leader of the government) is answerable to, and must maintain the support of, the House of Representatives; thus, whenever the office of prime minister falls vacant, the governor-general appoints the person who is most likely to command the support of the House. If the House of Representatives loses confidence in the Cabinet, and therefore in the government, then it can dissolve the government if a vote of no-confidence is passed.

== Members and elections ==
The House of Representatives normally consists of 120 members, who bear the title "Member of Parliament" (MP). They were previously known as "Members of the House of Representatives" (MHRs) until the passing of the Parliamentary and Executive Titles Act 1907 when New Zealand became a Dominion, and even earlier as "Members of the General Assembly" (MGAs).

All MPs are democratically elected, and usually enter the House following a general election. Once sworn in, MPs normally continue to serve until the next dissolution of parliament and subsequent general election, which must take place at least every three years. Early general elections (sometimes termed "snap elections") are possible at the discretion of the prime minister, especially if a minority government is unable to retain the confidence of the House. Members who change their party allegiance during a term—known as "waka-jumping"—may be expelled from the House. Members may also be expelled in cases of criminal activity or other serious misconduct. Some expulsions have been challenged through the courts. Casual vacancies in electorates are filled through by-elections; if a list member's seat becomes vacant then the next available person on their party's list is appointed to the position. List MPs are free to stand in electorate by-elections and in the case of successful contest their own seat will be filled 'in turn'.

To be an MP a person must be a New Zealand citizen (by birth or naturalisation) at the time of the election and not be disqualified from enrolling to vote; unlike certain other countries, bankruptcy is not grounds for disqualification from office. Party list candidates are always nominated by political parties.

The annual salary of each MP has been $168,600 since October 2023, and members may receive additional salaries in right of other offices they hold (for instance, the speaker, whips, and chairpersons of select committees) as recognised by Remuneration Authority determinations. MPs' pay is rather more than double average weekly earnings, which in 2023 were $1,558 ($81,239 per annum). In 1930 it was said, "politics represent sacrifice to the best anti-Labour candidates", at a time when MPs were paid £550, also a bit more than double the average male wage of £4 12s a week (£240 per annum).

=== Number of members ===
The House started with 37 members in 1854, with numbers progressively increasing to 95 by 1882, before being reduced to 74 in 1891. Numbers slowly increased again to 99 in 1993. In 1996 numbers increased to at least 120 with the introduction of MMP elections (i.e. 120 plus any overhang seats; there has been at least one overhang seat in five of the 10 MMP elections held since 1996). The year in which each change in the number of members took effect is shown in the following table.

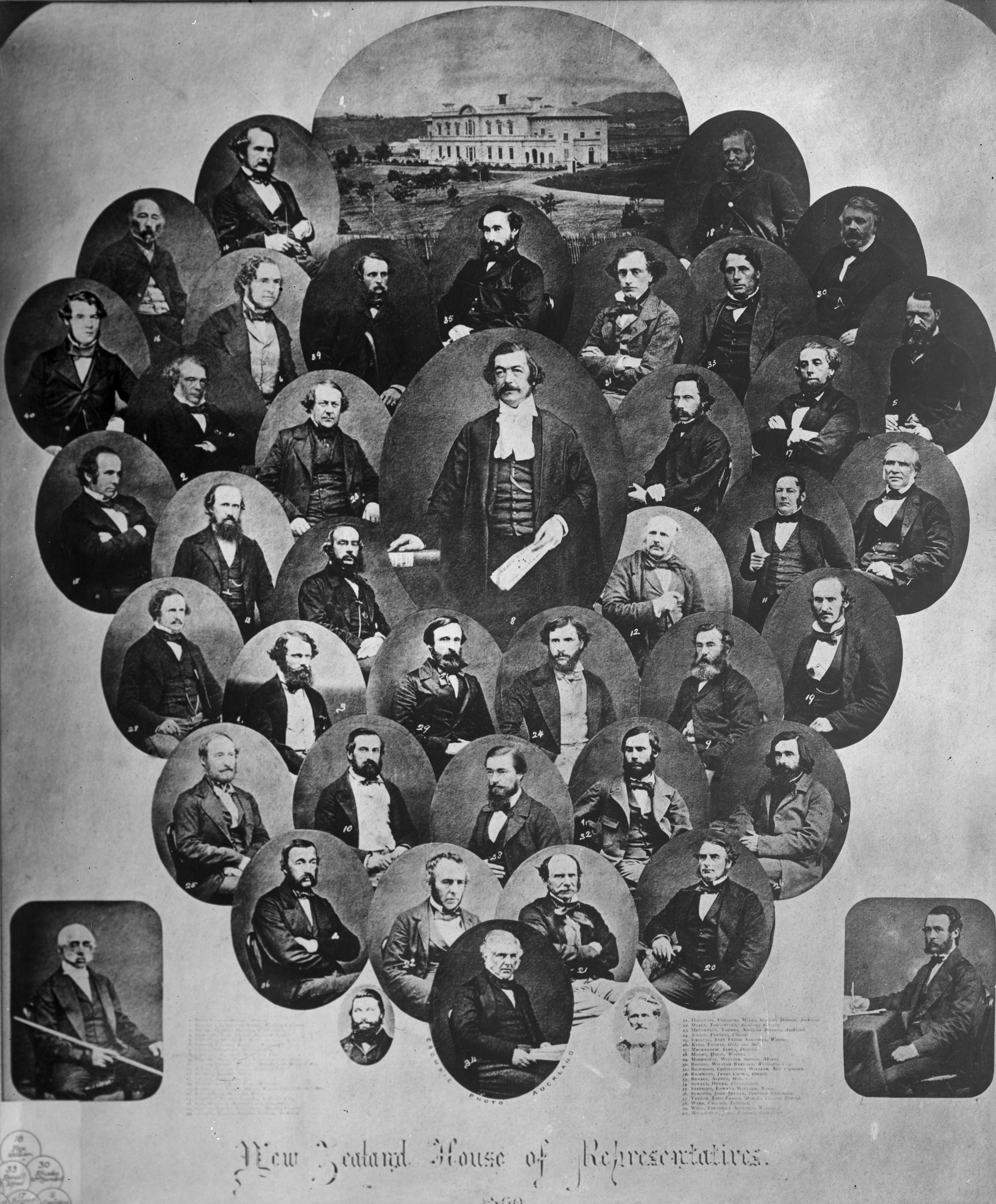
Montage of portraits depicting members of the House, the Serjeant-at-Arms, and the Clerk of the House, during the Second Parliament in 1860

Year	Number of seats
1854	37
1860	41
1861	53
1863	57
1866	70
1868	74
1871	78
1876	88
1882	95
1891	74
1902	80
1970	84^{1}
1973	87^{1}
1976	92^{2}
1984	95^{2}
1987	97^{2}
1993	99^{2}
1996	120 plus any overhang seats

Table notes

^{1} The total number of seats from 1969 to 1975 was calculated by the formula stated in the Electoral Amendment Act 1965: 4M+(PN/(PS/25)) where: 4M = 4 Māori seats; PN = European population of the North Island; PS = European population of the South Island.

^{2} The total number of seats from 1976 to 1995 was calculated by the formula stated in the Electoral Amendment Act 1975: (PM/(PS/25))+(PN/(PS/25)) where: PM = Māori population; PN = European population of the North Island; PS = European population of the South Island.

=== Electoral system ===
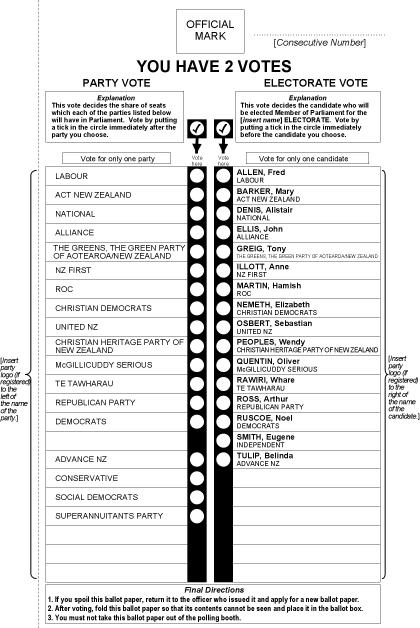
Example of a House of Representatives ballot paper used in MMP elections

Voting is not compulsory, but voter turnout is high compared to other democratic countries. Universal suffrage exists for those 18 or older; New Zealand citizens and others who are permanently residing in New Zealand are usually eligible to vote. New Zealand was the first self-governing nation to enfranchise women, starting from the 1893 election. There are a few disqualifications; for example, mentally-impaired persons detained in hospital and prisoners sentenced to a term of over three years are ineligible to vote.

Parliamentary elections are conducted by secret ballot—for European New Zealanders since 1871 and Māori seats since 1938. Almost all general elections between 1853 and 1993 were held under the first-past-the-post voting system, with the exception of the 1908 and 1911 elections, which used a two-round system. Since 1996, a form of proportional representation called mixed-member proportional (MMP) has been used. Under the MMP system each person has two votes; one is for electorate seats (including some reserved for Māori), and the other is for a party. Currently there are 72 electorate seats (which includes seven Māori electorates), and the remaining 48 seats are apportioned (from party lists) so that representation in parliament reflects the party vote, although a party has to win one electorate or 5 percent of the total party vote before it is eligible for these seats. After the introduction of proportional representation, no single party won an outright majority until the 2020 election when Prime Minister Jacinda Ardern led the Labour Party to win 65 of the 120 seats.

=== Last election and current composition ===
The 2023 general election was the most recent, and the 54th New Zealand Parliament first sat on 5 December 2023. It consists of 123 members, representing six parliamentary parties. Of these current MPs, 54 (43.9%) are women—the second-highest number since women were first allowed to stand for Parliament in 1919, after the high of 61 (50.8%) achieved during the term of the 53rd parliament.

Based on British tradition, the longest continuously serving member in the House holds the unofficial title "father [or mother] of the House". The current Father of the House is Gerry Brownlee, the current speaker, who has served continuously since 1996. He became the Father of the House following the departure of former speaker Trevor Mallard, who had served in the House since 1993. The current Mother of the House, as the longest continuously serving female MP, is Judith Collins who was first elected in 2002.

Summary of the 14 October 2023 election for the House of Representatives
Party	Party vote				Electorate vote sum				Total seats	+/-
Party	Votes	Of total (%)	Change (pp)	Seats	Votes	Of total (%)	Change (pp)	Seats	Total seats	+/-
National	1,085,851	38.08	▲12.51	5	1,192,251	43.47	▲9.34	43	48	▲16
Labour	767,540	26.92	▼23.09	17	855,963	31.21	▼16.86	17	34	▼31
Green	330,907	11.61	▲3.75	12	226,575	8.26	▲2.52	3	15	▲5
ACT	246,473	8.64	▲1.06	9	149,507	5.45	▲1.99	2	11	▲1
NZ First	173,553	6.09	▲3.49	8	76,676	2.80	▲1.73	0	8	▲8
Te Pāti Māori	87,844	3.08	▲1.92	0	106,584	3.89	▲1.73	6	6	▲4
Opportunities (TOP)	63,344	2.22	▲0.72	0	27,975	1.02	▲0.13	0	0	Steady
NZ Loyal	34,478	1.20	new	0	32,240	1.18	new	0	0	new
NewZeal (Note: Formerly known as ONE Party.)	16,126	0.56	▲0.28	0	3,585	0.13	▼0.11	0	0	Steady
Legalise Cannabis	13,025	0.45	0.00	0	12,566	0.46	▲0.17	0	0	Steady
Freedoms NZ (Note: A coalition consisting of the Freedom and Rights Coalition, Vision NZ, the NZ Outdoors & Freedom Party, and a few other unregistered parties.)	9,586	0.33	▲0.08	0				0	0	Steady
DemocracyNZ	6,786	0.23	new	0	12,060	0.44	new	0	0	new
Animal Justice	5,018	0.17	new	0	5,829	0.21	new	0	0	new
New Conservative	4,532	0.15	▼1.32	0	3,167	0.12	▼1.64	0	0	Steady
Women's Rights	2,513	0.08	new	0	0	0.00	new	0	0	new
Leighton Baker Party	2,105	0.07	new	0	2,623	0.10	new	0	0	new
New Nation	1,530	0.05	new	0	433	0.02	new	0	0	new
Unregistered parties										
Independent					34,277	1.25	▲0.87			
Valid votes	2,851,211				2,742,677					
Informal votes	16,267				40,353					
Disallowed votes	16,633				59,043					
Below electoral threshold										
Total	2,884,111	100.00		51	2,842,073	100.00		71	122	
Eligible voters and turnout	3,688,292	78.20	▼4.04		3,688,292	77.06	▼5.18			

== Officials and officers ==
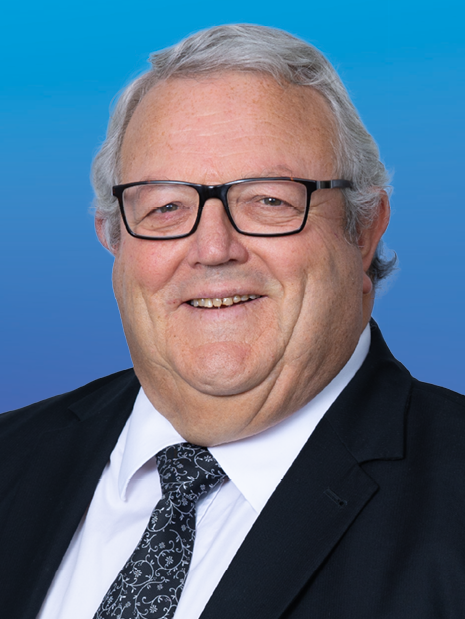
Gerry Brownlee is the current Speaker of the House

The House of Representatives elects one of its members as a presiding officer, known as the speaker of the House, at the beginning of each new parliamentary term, and also whenever a vacancy arises. It is the speaker's role to apply the rules of the House (called the Standing Orders), and oversee procedures and the day-to-day operation of the chamber. The speaker responds to points of order from other members of the House. When presiding, the speaker is obliged to remain impartial. Additionally, since 1992, the House elects a deputy speaker from amongst its members; the deputy may preside when the speaker is absent. Up to two assistants are also appointed from amongst the members of the House.

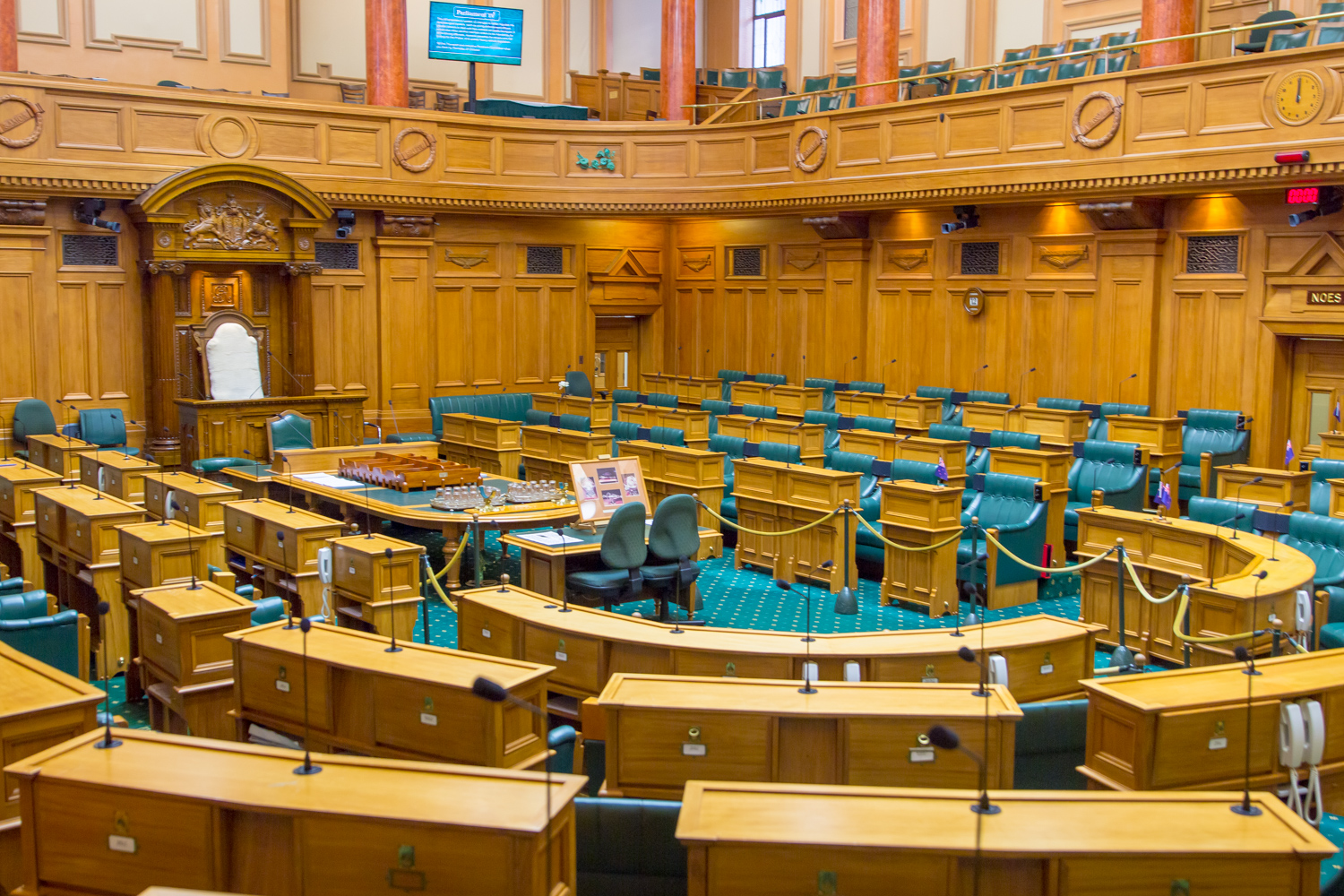
The debating chamber of the House of Representatives; the speaker's chair is at the rear and centre in the room.

Several political party-based roles are filled by elected MPs. The prime minister is the leader of the largest government party and leads the government's contribution to major debates in the House. The leader of the Official Opposition is the MP who leads the largest opposition party. The leader of the House is an MP appointed by the prime minister to arrange government business and the legislative programme of Parliament. Whips (called musterers by the Green Party) are organisers and administrators of the MPs in each of the political parties in the House. The whips make sure that members of their caucus are in the House during crucial votes.

Officers of the House who are not MPs include the clerk of the House, the deputy clerk, the chief parliamentary counsel (a lawyer who helps to draft bills), and several other junior clerks. These are non-partisan roles. The most senior of these officers is the clerk of the House, who is responsible for several key administrative tasks, such as "advising members on the rules, practices and customs of the House".

Another important officer is the serjeant-at-arms, whose duties include the maintenance of order and security in the precincts of the House. The serjeant-at-arms sits in the debating chamber opposite the speaker at the visitors door for each House sitting session. The serjeant-at-arms is also the custodian of the mace, and bears the mace into and out of the chamber of the House at the beginning and end of each sitting day.

== Procedure ==
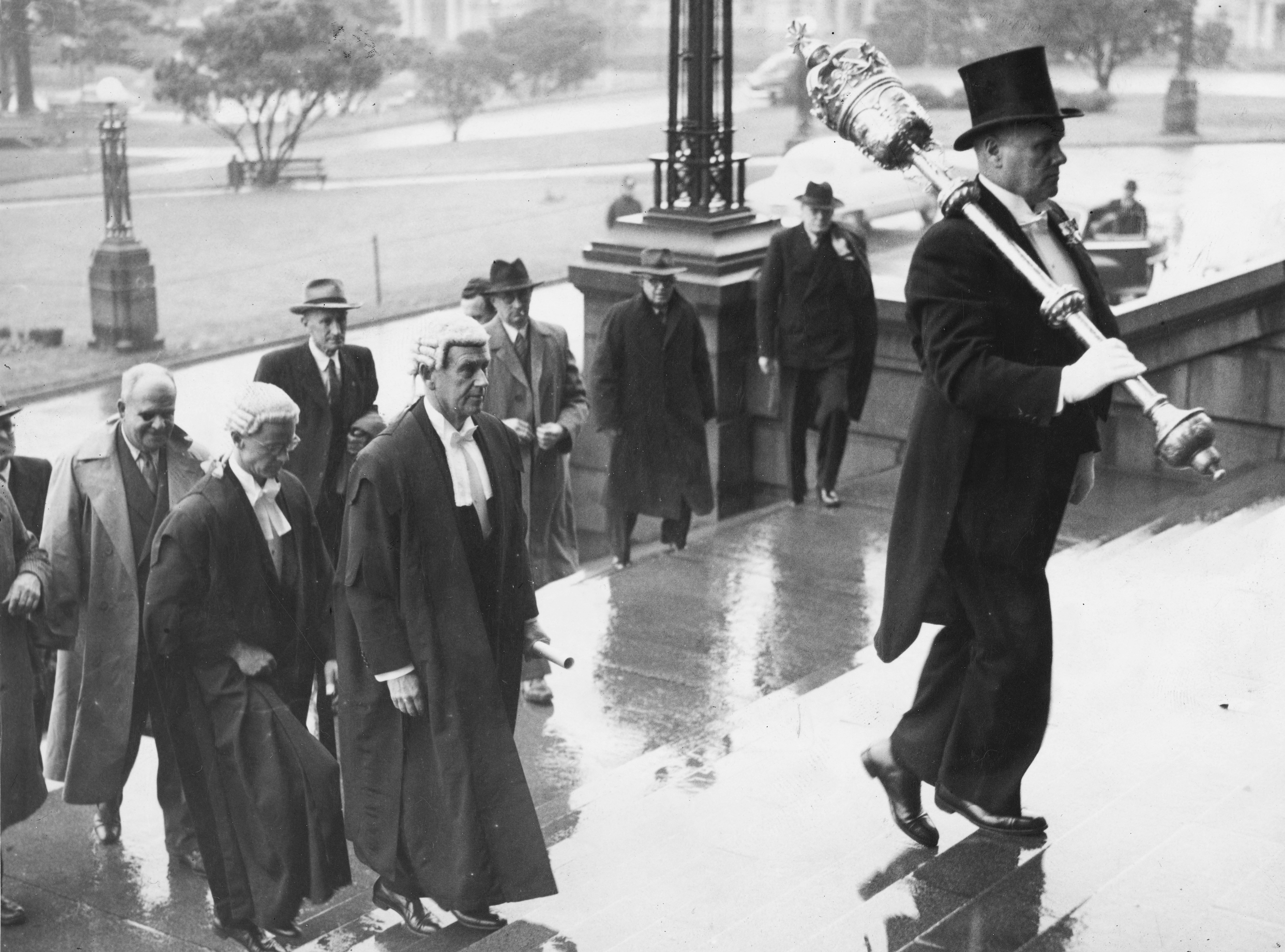
The mace being carried into Parliament by the Serjeant-at-Arms at the opening of the 29th Parliament, 1950

The House of Representatives usually sits Tuesday to Thursday when in session. It meets in the debating chamber inside Parliament House, Wellington. The layout is similar to the design of the chamber of the British House of Commons. The seats and desks are arranged in rows in a horseshoe pattern. The speaker of the House sits in a raised chair at the open end of the horseshoe, giving them a clear view of proceedings. In front of the chair is a table, on which rests a mace, a formal symbol of the authority of the House. MPs cannot lawfully meet without the mace being in the chamber. The current mace has been used since 7 October 1909, and is a replica of the one in the British House of Commons.

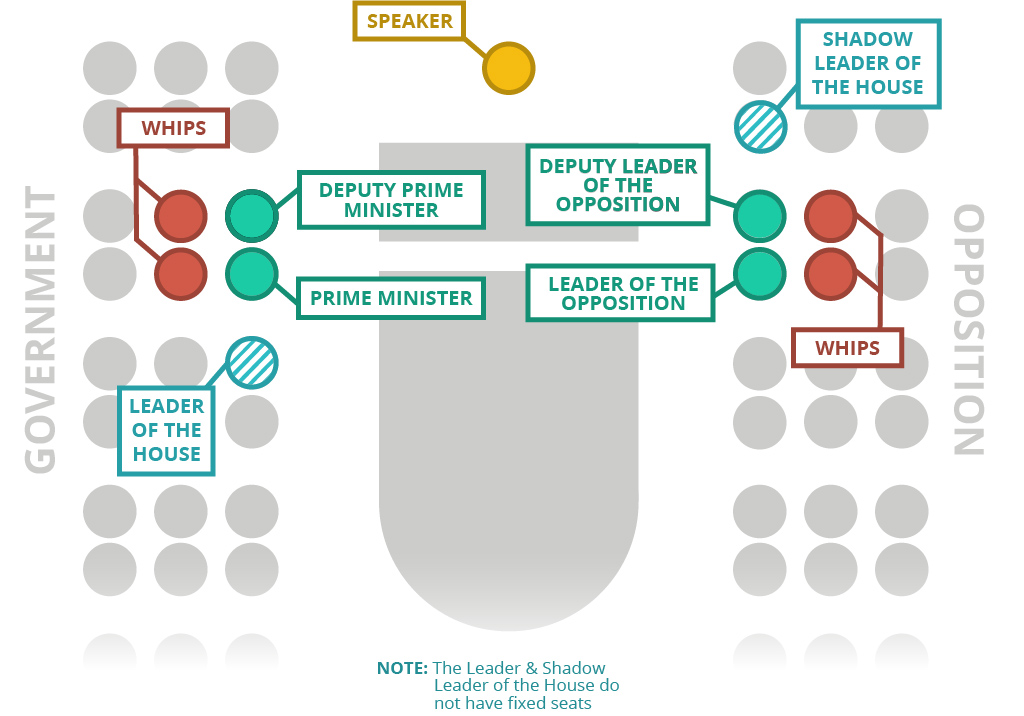
Layout of important roles and where they are seated in the debating chamber

Various officers—clerks and other officials—sit at the table, ready to advise the speaker on procedure when necessary. Members of the Government occupy the seats on the speaker's right, while members of the Official Opposition sit on the speaker's left. Members are assigned seating on the basis of the seniority in a party caucus; ministers sit around the prime minister, who is traditionally assigned the fourth seat along the front row on the speaker's right. The Opposition leader sits directly across from the prime minister and is surrounded by Opposition spokespersons. A member who is not a minister or spokesperson is referred to as a "backbencher". A backbencher may still be subject to party discipline (called "whipping"). Whips ensure that members of their party attend and vote as the party leadership desires. Government whips are seated behind the prime minister; Opposition whips are normally seated behind the leader of the Opposition. Members from parties that are not openly aligned with either the Government or the Official Opposition are sometimes referred to as "crossbenchers".

=== Debates and votes ===
Members have the option of addressing the House in English, Māori (te reo Māori), or New Zealand Sign Language (with an interpreter provided). Speeches are addressed to the presiding officer, using the words 'Mister Speaker', if a man, or 'Madam Speaker', if a woman. Only the speaker may be directly addressed in debate; other members must be referred to in the third person, either by full name or office. The speaker can "name" a member believed to have broken the rules of conduct of the House; following a vote this will usually result in the expulsion of the member from the chamber.

During debates, members may only speak if called upon by the speaker. No member may speak more than once on the same question (except that the mover of a motion is entitled to make one speech at the beginning of the debate and another at the end). The Standing Orders of the House of Representatives prescribe time limits for speeches. The limits depend on the nature of the motion, but are most commonly between 10 and 20 minutes. Under certain circumstances, the prime minister and other party leaders are entitled to make longer speeches. Debate may be further restricted by the passage of "time allocation" motions. Alternatively, the House may end debate more quickly by passing a motion for "closure".

A vote is held to resolve a question when it is put to the House of Representatives. The House first votes by voice vote; the speaker or deputy speaker puts the question, and MPs respond either "Aye" (in favour of the motion) or "No" (against the motion). The presiding officer then announces the result of the voice vote, but if their assessment is challenged by any member, a recorded vote known as a division follows. There are two methods of handling a division: party vote is used for most votes, but personal vote is used for conscience issues. In the party vote method, the clerk of the House reads out each party's name in turn. A member of the party (usually a whip) will respond to their party's name by stating how many members of the party are in favour and how many members are opposed. The clerk tallies up the votes and gives the results to the speaker, who announces the result. If the members of a party are not unanimous, a list of the members of the party and how they voted must be tabled after the vote. In the personal vote method, MPs enter one of two lobbies (the "Aye" lobby or the "No" lobby) on either side of the chamber. At each lobby are two tellers (themselves MPs) who count the votes of the MPs. Once the division concludes, the tellers provide the results to the speaker, who then announces the result. In case of a tie, the motion lapses.

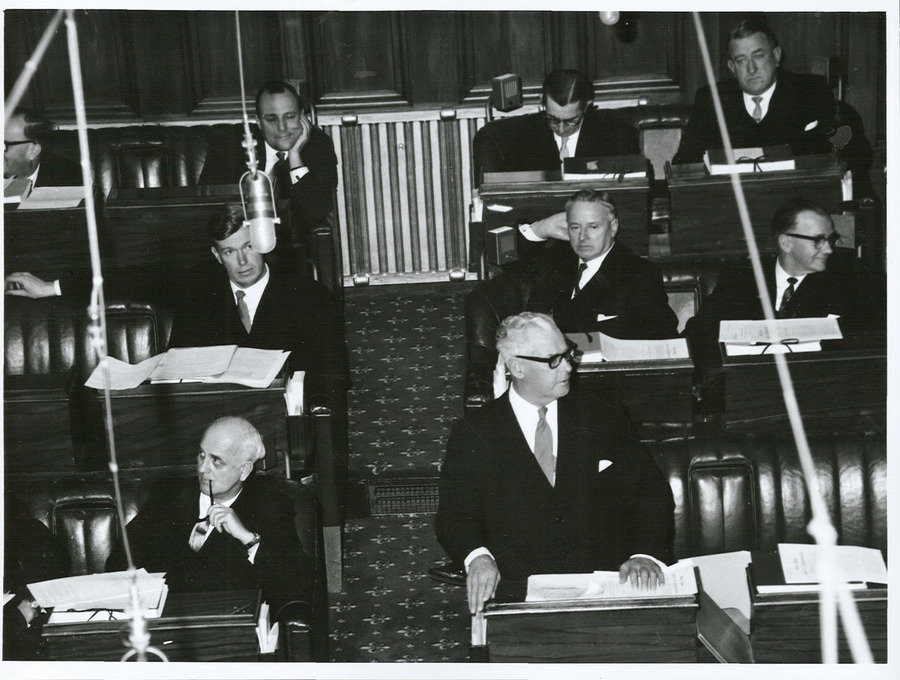
A parliament publicity photograph from 1966. The Prime Minister, Keith Holyoake, addresses the House.

Every sitting day a period of time is set aside for questions to be asked of ministers and select committee chairs. Questions to a minister must related to their official ministerial activities, not about activities as a party leader. There are 12 questions, which are distributed proportionately among the parties. In addition to questions asked orally during question time, members may also make inquiries in writing. Written questions are submitted to the clerk, either on paper or electronically, and answers are recorded in Parliamentary Debates (Hansard).

== Passage of legislation ==
Most parliamentary business is about making new laws and amending existing ones. The House examines and amends bills—proposed pieces of legislation under consideration by the House—in several reading and committee stages. The term "reading" originates from the practice in the British Parliament where bills were literally read aloud in the chamber. In New Zealand only a bill's title is read aloud. A vote is taken after each of three readings. If a bill is approved by the three votes, it receives royal assent from the governor-general and thus is enacted, becoming an act of Parliament and part of New Zealand law.

There are four types of bills – government bills, members' bills, local bills and private bills. The majority of bills are government bills, which are proposed by the government of the day (that is, the party or coalition parties that command a majority in the House) to implement its policies. These policies may relate to the raising of revenue through taxation bills or the expenditure of money through appropriation bills (including those bills giving effect to the budget). It is rare for government bills to be defeated—indeed the first to be defeated in the twentieth century was in 1998, when the Local Government Amendment Bill (No 5) was defeated on its second reading.

Individual MPs who are not ministers may propose members' bills—these are usually put forward by opposition parties, or by MPs who wish to deal with a matter that parties do not take positions on. At any time, there are eight members bills awaiting their first reading, and when space becomes available, new member's bills are selected by ballot to be introduced. The ballot is conducted by drawing numbered counters out of a biscuit tin, giving the whole member's bill process the nickname "democracy by biscuit tin".

Local bills are put forward by local authorities to deal with matters within their own geographic area. Private bills, which are now rare, are put forward by individuals or groups of people for matters that affect only them. An MP introduces a local bill or a private bill, and need not support the intent of the bill.

Proxy voting is allowed, in which members may designate a party or another member to vote on their behalf. An excuse is required.

=== First reading ===
The first stage of the process is the first reading. The member introducing the bill (often a minister) will give a detailed speech on the bill as a whole. Debate on the bill lasts about two hours for government bills and one hour for other members' bills, with 12 MPs making ten-minute speeches on the bill's general principles. Speaking slots are allocated based on the size of each party, with different parties using different methods to distribute their slots among their members.

The member introducing the bill will generally make a recommendation that the bill be considered by an appropriate select committee (see § Committees). Sometimes, it will be recommended that a special committee be formed, usually when the bill is particularly important or controversial. The House then votes as to whether the bill should be sent to the committee for deliberation. It is not uncommon for a bill to be voted to the select committee stage even by parties which do not support it—since select committees can recommend amendments to bills, parties will often not make a final decision on whether to back a bill until the second reading.

Prior to the first reading, the attorney-general will check the bill is consistent with the New Zealand Bill of Rights Act 1990. If the bill or part of it is not consistent, the attorney-general will present a report to the House, known as a Section 7 report, highlighting the inconsistencies.

=== Select committee stage ===
The select committee will scrutinise the bill, going over it in more detail than can be achieved by the whole membership of the House. The public can also make submissions to select committees, offering support, criticism, or merely comments. Written submissions from the public to the committee are normally due two months after the bill's first reading. Submitters can opt to also give an oral submission, which are heard by the committee in Wellington, and numbers permitting, Auckland and Christchurch. The select committee stage is seen as increasingly important today—in the past, the governing party generally dominated select committees, making the process something of a rubber stamp, but in the multi-party environment there is significant scope for real debate. Select committees frequently recommend changes to bills, with prompts for change coming from the MPs sitting in the committee, officials who advise the committee, and members of the public. When a majority of the committee is satisfied with the bill, the committee will report back to the House on it. Unless Parliament grants an extension, the time limit for select committee deliberations is six months or whatever deadline was set by the House when the bill was referred.

=== Second reading ===
The second reading, like the first, generally consists of a two-hour debate in which MPs make ten-minute speeches. Again, speaking slots are allocated to parties based on their size. In theory, speeches should relate to the principles and objects of the bill, and also to the consideration and recommendations of the select committee and issues raised in public submissions. Parties will usually have made their final decision on a bill after the select committee stage, and will make their views clear during the second reading debates. At the conclusion of debate, the House votes on whether to accept any amendments recommended by the select committee by majority (unanimous amendments are not subjected to this extra hurdle).

The Government (usually through the minister of finance) has the power (given by the House's Standing Orders) to veto any proposed legislation that would have a major impact on the Government's budget and expenditure plans. This veto can be invoked at any stage of the process, but if applied to a bill as a whole will most likely be employed at the second-reading stage. Since the financial veto certificate was introduced in 1996, the Government has exercised it only once in respect of an entire bill, in 2016, although many amendments have been vetoed at the committee of the whole House stage.

If a bill receives its second reading, it goes on to be considered by a committee of the whole House.

=== Committee of the whole House ===
When a bill reaches the committee of the whole House stage, the House resolves itself "into committee", that is, it forms a committee consisting of all MPs (as distinct from a select committee, which consists only of a few members). When the House is "in committee", it is able to operate in a slightly less formal way than usual.

During a committee of the whole House, a bill is debated in detail, usually "part by part" (a "part" is a grouping of clauses). MPs may make five-minute speeches on a particular part or provision of the bill and may propose further amendments, but theoretically should not make general speeches on the bill's overall goals or principles (that should have occurred at the second reading).

Sometimes a member may advertise the proposed amendments beforehand by having them printed on an Amendment Paper (known as Supplementary Order Papers prior to the 54th Parliament); this is common for amendments proposed by government ministers. Some Amendment Papers are very extensive, and, if agreed to, can result in major amendments to bills. On rare occasions, Amendment Papers are referred to select committees for comment.

The extent to which a bill changes during this process varies. If the select committee that considered the bill did not have a government majority and made significant alterations, the Government may make significant "corrective" amendments. There is some criticism that bills may be amended to incorporate significant policy changes without the benefit of select committee scrutiny or public submissions, or even that such major changes can be made with little or no notice. However, under the MMP system when the Government is less likely to have an absolute majority, any amendments will usually need to be negotiated with other parties to obtain majority support.

The Opposition may also put forward wrecking amendments. These amendments are often just symbolic of their contrasting policy position, or simply intended to delay the passage of the bill through the sheer quantity of amendments for the committee of the whole House to vote on.

=== Third reading ===
The final reading takes the same format as the first and second readings—a two-hour debate with MPs making ten-minute speeches. The speeches once again refer to the bill in general terms, and represent the final chance for debate. A final vote is taken. If a bill passes its third reading, it is passed on to the governor-general, who will (assuming constitutional conventions are followed) give it Royal Assent as a matter of law. The title is changed from a bill to an act, and it becomes law.

== Committees ==
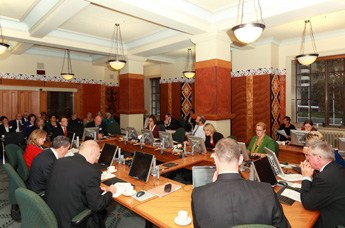
A select committee hearing in action during the 49th Parliament

In addition to the work of the main chamber, the House of Representatives also has a large number of committees, established in order to deal with particular areas or issues. There are 12 subject select committees, which scrutinise and amend bills. They can call for submissions from the public, thereby meaning that there is a degree of public consultation before a parliamentary bill proceeds into law. The strengthening of the committee system was in response to concerns that legislation was being forced through, without receiving due examination and revision.

Each committee has between six and twelve members—including a chairperson and deputy chairperson—with parties broadly represented in proportion to party membership in the House. MPs may be members of more than one committee. Membership of committees is determined by the Business Specialist Committee, which is chaired by the speaker.

Occasionally a special committee will be created on a temporary basis; an example was the Select Committee established to study the foreshore and seabed bill.

== History ==
=== Māori representation ===
New Zealand had representatives of the indigenous population in its parliament from an early date compared to many other colonial states. Reserved Māori seats were created in 1867 during the term of the 4th Parliament; Māori men aged 21 and over, whether or not they owned property, could vote to elect four Māori members of the House of Representatives. The seats were initially intended to be temporary whilst common Māori land was broken up that would allow Māori to vote in regular seats as individual land owners. However this process was resisted and the seats became permanent in 1876.

All Māori gained the right to vote in general electorates, along with all women, in 1893. Māori alone can vote in the Māori electorates that have existed since 1867. They may choose to enrol to vote and stand as candidates in these electorates or in the general electorates. In 2002, the seats increased in number to seven determined by the numbers on the Māori electoral roll.

According to Statistics New Zealand, as of 2023, 598,360 New Zealanders over the age of 18 identified as Māori. Of these 297,589 opted to vote in the Māori electorates. In 2023, of the total of 123 members of Parliament, there were 33 Māori MPs representing all political parties. Of the six parties in Parliament in 2025 four are led or co-led by Māori. Two of these leaders are sharing the role of deputy prime minister in the 2023–2026 Parliament.

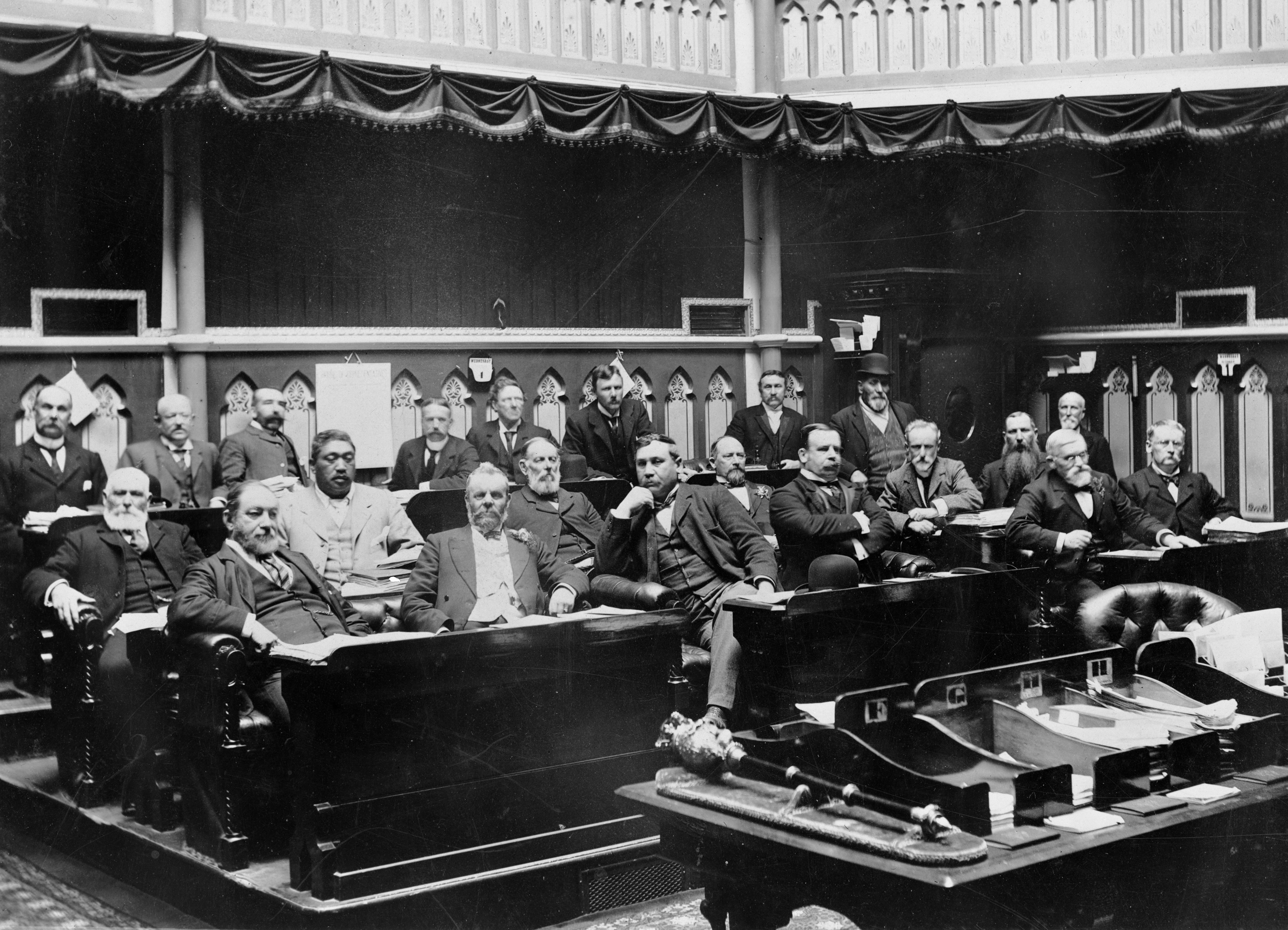
Chamber of the House of Representatives, c. 1900–1902

The first Māori elected were Frederick Nene Russell, Mete Kingi Te Rangi Paetahi, Tāreha Te Moananui and John Patterson, who took their places in the House in 1868. Other notable Māori members of Parliament have been Sir James Carroll, Āpirana Ngata, and Matiu Rata. Carroll, of Ngāti Kahungunu, held the Eastern Māori seat from 1887 to 1893 and the general electorate seat of Gisborne from 1908 to 1919. He was acting prime minister in 1909 and 1911.

Āpirana Ngata, of Ngāti Porou, was the first Māori to graduate from a New Zealand university. He was a leading figure in the Young Māori Party, which advocated participation in mainstream New Zealand politics. During the first and second world wars Ngata supported Māori taking part, stating that "British sovereignty was accepted by our forefathers and it has given the Māori people rights which they would not have been accorded under any conqueror." He was knighted in 1927 and was a very active cabinet minister promoting Māori land development and the revival of Māori art and culture.

Matiu Rata (Ngāti Kurī, Te Aupōuri, and Ngāti Whātua) was elected in 1963 and served until 1980, holding a ministerial portfolio from 1972 to 1975. He advocated for the national recognition of Waitangi Day, for workers' and union rights, and the return of Māori land. In 1972 Rata sailed with a peace flotilla to protest the French nuclear tests in the south Pacific. Rata's major legacy was the Waitangi Tribunal to redress confiscations of Māori land and other historical injustices. As of January 2023 $2.6 billion has been awarded in settlements along with the transfer of ownership of lake and river beds, fishing rights, and just over a quarter of a million hectares of land.

=== Party politics ===
Until the 1890s MPs were all independent, although they often grouped themselves into loose factions. Some of the factions were occasionally referred to as "parties", but were vague and ill-defined. Factions formed around a number of different views – at one time, centralism and provincialism were the basis, at another time it was geographical region. Towards the 1880s, factions had gradually become stabilised along lines of liberalism and conservatism, although the line between the two was by no means certain.

The New Zealand Liberal Party was established as the first formal New Zealand political party in 1891, after which "political power shifted from the House of Representatives to elections, parties and leaders." The conservative Reform Party was formed in 1909, and the New Zealand Labour Party in 1916. The New Zealand National Party emerged in 1936 from the amalgamation of Reform and a remnant of the Liberals, the United Party.

=== Country quota ===
One historical speciality of the electoral system was the country quota, which gave greater representation to rural politics. From 1889 on (and even earlier in more informal forms), districts were weighted according to their urban/rural split (with any locality of less than 2,000 people considered rural). Those districts which had large rural proportions received a greater number of nominal votes than they actually contained voters – as an example, in 1927, Waipawa, a district without any urban population at all, received an additional 4,153 nominal votes to its actual 14,838 – having the maximum factor of 28% extra representation. The country quota was abolished in 1945 by a mostly urban-elected Labour government, which switched to a one-vote-per-person system.

=== Women MPs and children ===
Whetu Tirikatene-Sullivan was the longest-serving female MP (1967–1996) and the first MP to give birth while in office. Ruth Richardson was the first MP to bring her baby into the debating chamber, while Katherine Rich was the first to feed her baby in the House. During the 1990s, a childcare centre was established for the children of MPs and parliamentary staff. In November 2017, Speaker of the House Trevor Mallard announced that Parliament would become more "family friendly". Family-friendly policies have included making an atrium near the parliamentary chamber accessible to MP's children, giving carers and spouses the same security clearances as MPs, opening the parliamentary swimming pool to the families of MPs and staff, and updating the family room to have baby-feeding and changing facilities, and a play area on Parliament's lawn.

== New Zealand Youth Parliament ==
Once in every term of Parliament a New Zealand Youth Parliament is held. This major national event is open to 16- to 18-year-olds who are appointed by individual MPs to represent them in their role for a few days in Wellington. The Youth MPs spend time debating a mock bill in the House and in select committees, and asking questions of Cabinet ministers. As of January 2026 the previous New Zealand Youth Parliament was held in July 2025.

== Accredited news organisations ==
The table below lists news agencies which are accredited members of the New Zealand House of Representatives press gallery. Press gallery members are provided facilities at Parliament to report the proceedings in the House. The listed membership type is the highest level of membership of any member associated with the agency, except for life membership. As of June 2025, there are fifteen living life members of the press gallery.

Agency	Membership type
Associated Press	Full
Bloomberg	Associate
BusinessDesk	Associate
Getty Images	Ancillary
The Guardian	Associate
Hagen Hopkins Photography	Ancillary
The Health Media	Associate
Interest.co.nz	Full
Law News	Associate
The Listener	Associate
Mark Coote Photographer	Ancialliary
National Business Review	Full
News Resources Ltd	Associate
Newsroom	Full
Newstalk ZB	Full
New Zealand Herald	Full
Oceania TV	Associate
Pacific Media Network	Full
The Platform	Associate
Politik	Full
The Post	Full
Radio New Zealand	Full
Radio Waatea	Full
Re: News	Associate
Reuters	Associate
Salient	Associate
Select Committee News	Associate
Setford News Photo Agency	Ancillary
Sky News	Full
The Spinoff	Full
Stuff / ThreeNews	Full
Te Upoko o Te Ika	Associate
Television New Zealand	Full
Whakaata Māori	Full

== See also ==
- Adjournment debate
- Legislature broadcasters in New Zealand
- List of longest-serving members of the New Zealand House of Representatives
- List of members of the New Zealand Parliament who died in office
- Lists of acts of the New Zealand Parliament
- Office of the Ombudsman (New Zealand)
- Parliamentary Debates (Hansard), the official transcripts of debates
