= First Māori elections =

New Zealand elections held in 1868

- 15 April – 20 June 1868

4 seats in the New Zealand House of Representatives
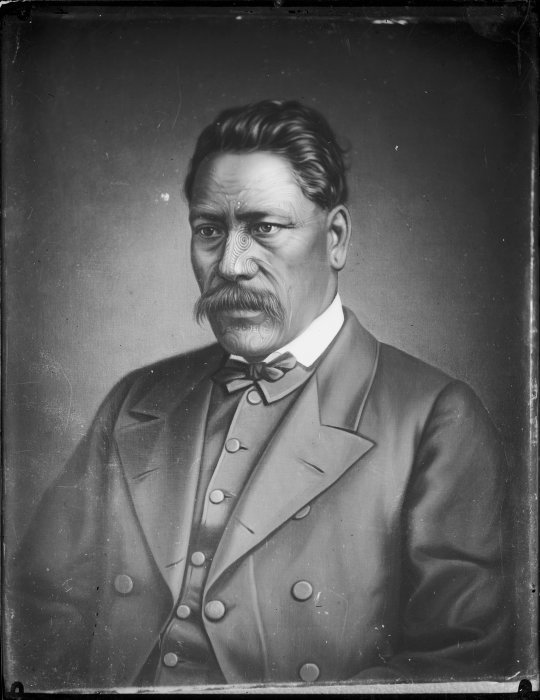

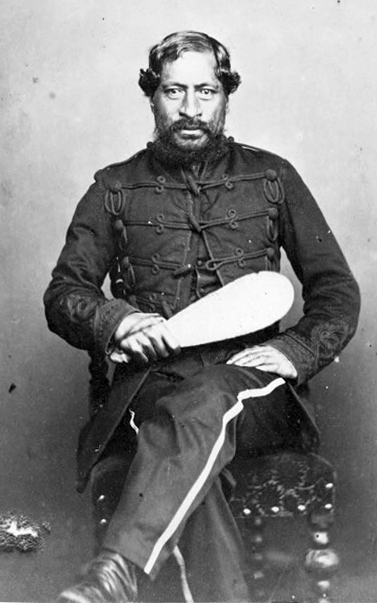

	First party	Second party
Leader	Tāreha Te Moananui	Mete Kīngi Paetahi
Party	Independent	Independent
Leader's seat	Eastern Maori	Western Maori
	Third party	Fourth party
Leader	Hōne Paratene Tamanuiarangi	Frederick Nene Russell
Party	Independent	Independent
Leader's seat	Southern Maori	Northern Maori
Premier before election
Edward Stafford
Independent
Subsequent Premier
Edward Stafford
Independent

The first Māori elections were held in 1868 in four newly formed Māori electorates during the term of 4th Parliament.

All subsequent Māori elections were always held as part of the general elections.

== History ==
New Zealand's parliamentary history begins with the New Zealand Constitution Act 1852, a British Act of Parliament that granted limited self-rule to the settlers in the colony. This was a reaction to widespread frustration with the colonial authorities, and in particular the nearly unlimited power of the Governor. The Constitution Act established a bicameral parliament, with the upper house (the Legislative Council) appointed, and the lower house (the House of Representatives) elected every five years. In addition, it allowed for six provincial councils, elected every four years.

To be eligible to vote, the following criteria had to be met:

- male
- aged at least 21 years old
- owners of freehold land worth at least £50, or leasehold of a certain annual amount (£10 for farmland or a city house, or £5 for a rural house)

In theory, this would have allowed Māori men to vote, but most of their land was communally held (rather than held by individuals) and held in customary title (i.e. unregistered as opposed to freehold) and thus fell outside of the definitions of the Constitution Act. As a consequence, Māori were effectively unable to register as voters.

The Constitution Act made an allowance, in Section 71, for some districts to be set aside where Māori laws, customs and ways of life were maintained "for the Government of themselves, in all their Relations and Dealings with each other", provided these were "not repugnant to general principles of humanity." Whilst this would have allowed some degree of self-governance by Māori, Section 71 was never implemented.

The single most important issues in the 1850s and 1860s was that of land and land sales. With land held by Māori and the settler population increasing rapidly, there was a huge demand for making land available for new settlers. Many settlers took for granted that Māori land would progressively become available for agricultural development.

The Treaty of Waitangi, in the second article, gave the Crown the pre-emptive right for all land purchases from Māori. This was the chief source of income for the Crown, and later the Provinces, as they would pass on the land to the settlers with a significant margin. But it also put some control over the way Māori were dealt with. The colony obtained much self-control from the Crown with the New Zealand Constitution Amendment Act, which was passed in 1857. This transferred much decision making from Britain to the colony, and without this change, the Native Land Acts of 1862 and 1865 would not have been possible. Those Acts abolished Crown pre-emption of land (thus nullifying the treaty's second article), and enabled certificate of title to be issued to individual Māori, with titles held by no more than ten individuals, but each individual had the sole power of selling the title. Settlers could then negotiate with individuals and as soon as one of them was a willing seller, transfer of title could happen. With that system in place, 95% of the North Island was able to be transferred to settlers or the Government by 1900. In historian Claudia Orange's assessment, the 1865 Act "introduced revolutionary change".

The increased land sales and the ability of one owner to sell land without consent of the joint owners is what led to the New Zealand Wars.

James FitzGerald, who in 1865 was for a brief period Minister of Māori Affairs, explained his attitudes to James Crowe Richmond as follows:

Two rules are deeply fixed in my mind. 1. To expect men to respect law who don't enjoy it is absurd. 2. To try and govern a folk by our courts and at the same time to say that our courts shall take no cognisance of their property is amazing folly. Two-thirds of the Northern Island is held under a tenure which is ignored by our law. Is it possible to govern any people by a law which does not recognise their estate in land?

I blame no man for the past, but for the future I take this as my guide that a people cannot be governed by a law which pretends to be powerless to deal with their property; and that one race cannot govern another as a pariah class – make laws for them, and so on ignoring their right to partake in the making of those laws.

You may mock me as to Maoris sitting in parliament. My dear Friend, I am not a fool nor attribute to political forms mysterious virtues, but I know all that the sitting in parliament brings in its train and I say that ignore tenure to land and ignore the sitting in parliament and all that belongs thereto and the alternative is war, extermination to the weaker race and financial disaster to the stronger.

In his letter, FitzGerald was referring to the financial consequences of the land wars that were crippling the country.

Donald McLean introduced the Maori Representation Act in 1867. This allowed for the creation of four Māori electorates. One of the strong underlying motives was to overcome the problem with land ownership, which prevented Māori from enrolling as electors, as alluded to in the preamble of the Act:

Whereas owing to the peculiar nature of Māori land and to other causes the Native Aboriginal inhabitants of this Colony of New Zealand have heretofore with few exceptions been unable to become registered as electors or to vote at the election of members of the House of Representatives or of the Provincial Councils of the said Colony. And it is expedient for the better protection of the interests of Her Majesty’s subjects of the Native Race that temporary provisions should be made for the special representation of Her Majesty’s Native subjects in the House of Representatives and Provincial Councils of said Colony.

The expectation was that Māori landholdings would be converted to individual title within the next few years. At that point, the franchise was to revert to the normal rules based on property ownership. As such, the preamble of the Act made reference to 'temporary provisions' and the Act was to be in place for only five years. History has shown us, however, that Māori land stayed in communal ownership, and the franchise conditions for Māori electorates were extended in 1872 by another five years, and in 1876, the electorates were made permanent. Male Māori, due to their practical exclusion from the political process, received universal suffrage twelve years before European men. Universal suffrage for non-Māori men over 21 years was introduced for the 1879 general elections. It is difficult to imagine these days how radical it was back then to grant universal suffrage to Māori men. It helped that there had been precedents to this, first in the Pensioner Settlements electorate (created for the 1st Parliament in 1853), and then for the two gold fields electorates (Goldfields electorate in 1863 and Goldfields Towns electorate in 1866).

== Results ==
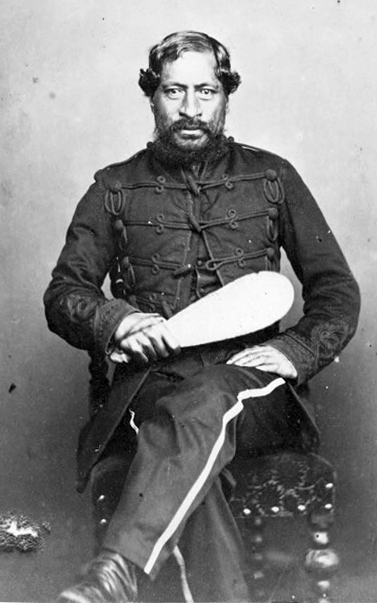
Formal seated portrait photograph of Mete Kīngi Paetahi, one of the first four Māori MPs, wearing a uniform and holding a patu

In all four electorates, the nomination meeting was held on Wednesday, 15 April 1868. Political parties would not form until after the 1890 elections, so all members were Independents.

Eastern Maori

At the nomination meeting in Napier, held in front of the Council offices, two candidates were proposed. Karaitiana Takamoana was the first one to be proposed. Tāreha Te Moananui was the other person put forward. When the returning officer asked for a show of hands, the outcome was 34 to 33 vote in favour of Moananui. When Europeans contested elections, it was common for the trailing party to demand a poll at this point, but this did not happen. Hence, Moananui was declared elected.

He was the first of the four to speak in Parliament. He represented the electorate of Eastern Maori from 1868 to the end of the term in 1870, when he retired. This was recalled by his descendant, Pita Sharples, in Parliament 140 years later.

Northern Maori

The nomination meeting for the Northern Maori electorate was held at the residence of the resident magistrate of Russell, Mr Barstow. At the meeting, Frederick Nene Russell was the only candidate proposed. He was thus declared elected. He represented the electorate of Northern Maori from 1868 to 1870 when he retired.

Southern Maori

At the nomination meeting near Woodend, three candidates were proposed.

John Patterson, also known by his Māori name of Hōne Paratene Tamanui a Rangi, was elected on 20 June in the Southern Maori electorate. He represented the electorate until 30 December 1870, when he retired at the dissolution of Parliament.

Western Maori

At the nomination meeting in Wanganui, held at the Courthouse, Mete Kīngi Paetahi was the only candidate proposed. He was thus elected unopposed. He represented the electorate of Western Maori from 1868 to 1870. He contested the electorate again at the 1871 general election, but was defeated by Wiremu Parata.

== Members ==
Member	Electorate	Election date (MM/DD)
Moananui, Tāreha Te	Eastern Maori	04/15
Paetahi, Mete Kīngi	Western Maori	04/17
Patterson, John	Southern Maori	06/20
Russell, Frederick Nene	Northern Maori	04/15
