= List of electoral firsts in the United Kingdom =

This article lists notable achievements of women, ethnic minorities, people with disabilities, and LGBT people in British politics.

== Women ==
Women over 30 granted the right to vote: 1918

Women granted the right to vote on the same terms as men: 1928

First female MPs:

- Countess Markievicz, Sinn Féin MP for Dublin St Patrick's, 1918–22

Due to the abstentionist policy of Sinn Féin, Markievicz never took her seat in the House of Commons.

- Viscountess Astor, Conservative MP for Plymouth Sutton, 1919–45

First female cabinet minister

- Margaret Bondfield, Labour MP, 1923–24 and 1926–31 and Minister of Labour, 1929–31.

First female Catholic MPs

- Countess Markievicz, Sinn Féin MP for Dublin St Patrick's, 1918–22.

She was also the first non-Protestant woman elected to Parliament, having converted to Catholicism in 1917. She abstained from the House of Commons.

- Alice Cullen, Labour MP for Glasgow Gorbals, 1948–69. She was the first female Catholic MP to take her seat.

First female member of the House of Lords

- Stella Isaacs, Marchioness of Reading, Baroness Swanborough, Crossbench peer, 1958–71

First female Commons Government Whip

- Harriet Slater, Labour MP, 1964–66

First female Lords Government Whip

- Annie Llewelyn-Davies, Baroness Llewelyn-Davies of Hastoe, Labour Lords Chief Whip, 1973–82

First female prime minister

- Margaret Thatcher, Conservative prime minister 1979–90

First female foreign secretary

- Margaret Beckett, Labour foreign secretary 2006-07

First female home secretary

- Jacqui Smith, Labour home secretary 2007-09

First female leader of the House of Lords

- Janet Young, Baroness Young, Conservative Leader 1981–83

First female speaker of the House of Commons

- Betty Boothroyd, Labour speaker 1992–2000

First female leader of the House of Commons

- Ann Taylor, Labour leader 1997–98

First female first minister of Scotland

- Nicola Sturgeon, SNPqq1 First Minister 2014-2023

First female justice secretary and lord high chancellor

- Liz Truss, 2016–17

First female Law Lord

- Brenda Hale, Baroness Hale of Richmond, 2004–2020

First female speaker in the House of Lords

- Helene Hayman, Baroness Hayman, Lord Speaker 2006–11 (and first person to hold that title)

First female Lord Spiritual

- Rachel Treweek, The Lord Bishop of Gloucester, 2015–present

First female ethnic minority member of the Senedd

- Natasha Asghar, 2021–present

First female ethnic minority directly elected mayor in England

- Brenda Dacres, Mayor of Lewisham, 2024-2026

First female chancellor

- Rachel Reeves, 2024-2026

== Blind people ==
First blind MP

- Henry Fawcett, Liberal MP for Brighton, 1864–74

First blind member of the House of Lords

- Ian Fraser, Baron Fraser of Lonsdale, Conservative peer, 1958–74

First blind Cabinet member

- David Blunkett, Labour Secretary of State for Education, 1997–2001, then Home Secretary 2001-04

First blind MSP

- Dennis Robertson, SNP MSP for Aberdeenshire West, 2011–16

First female blind MP (and first black blind MP)

- Marsha de Cordova, Labour MP for Battersea, 2017–present

== Wheelchair users ==
First MP in a wheelchair

- Arthur MacMurrough Kavanagh, Conservative MP for County Wexford (1866–68) and for County Carlow (1868–80). MacMurrough Kavanagh (who had been born with partially formed arms and legs) was given dispensation to be accompanied in the Commons Chamber by a servant who helped place him on the benches.

First female MP in a wheelchair

- Violet Bathurst, Lady Apsley, Conservative MP for Bristol Central, 1943–45

== Black Britons ==
First black MPs

- James Townsend, Whig MP for Calne, 1782-87 – First MP of partial Black African descent.
- John Stewart, Tory MP for Lymington, 1832-47 – One of the first mixed-race MPs .
- Henry Redhead Yorke, Whig MP for City of York, 1841-48 – The third MP identified by the History of Parliament's House of Commons 1832-68 project as of mixed ethnicity.
- Peter McLagan, Liberal MP for Linlithgowshire, 1865-93 – Scotland's first non-White and first Black MP.
- Bernie Grant, Labour MP for Tottenham, 1987–2000 – One of the UK's first Black British MPs since the Liberal Peter McLagan.
- Paul Boateng, Labour MP for Brent South, 1987–2005 – One of the UK's first Black British MPs since the Liberal Peter McLagan.
- Diane Abbott, Labour MP for Hackney North and Stoke Newington, 1987–present – First black woman elected to the UK Parliament.

First black woman MP

- Diane Abbott, Labour MP for Hackney North and Stoke Newington, 1987–present

First black cabinet member

- Paul Boateng, Labour Chief Secretary to the Treasury, 2002–05

First black female Cabinet member

- Valerie Amos, Labour Secretary of State for International Development, May–October 2003

First elected black female minister

- Dawn Butler, Labour Minister for Young Citizens and Youth Engagement, October 2009 – May 2010

First elected black secretary of state

- Kwasi Kwarteng, Conservative Secretary of State for Business, Energy and Industrial Strategy, 2021–22

First black member of the Welsh Assembly

- Vaughan Gething, Labour and Co-op AM for Cardiff South and Penarth, 2011–present

First black lord mayor of London

- James Townsend, Lord Mayor of London 1772-74

First black woman directly elected mayor

- Brenda Dacres, Mayor of Lewisham, 2024-present

== British Chinese ==
First member of the Northern Ireland Assembly of Chinese origin

- Anna Lo (盧曼華), Alliance Party MLA for Belfast South, 2007–16

First British MP of Chinese origin

- Alan Mak, Conservative MP for Havant, 2015–present

First female British MP of Chinese origin

- Sarah Owen, Labour MP for Luton North, 2019–present

== Czech Britons ==
First Czech-born MP

- Robert Maxwell, Labour MP for Buckingham 1964–1970

== Polish Britons ==
First MP of Polish Jewish descent

- Manny Shinwell, Labour MP for Linlithgowshire, Seaham and Easington, 1922–1924, 1928–1931 and 1935–1970

First Polish-born MP

- Daniel Kawczynski, Conservative MP for Shrewsbury and Atcham, 2005–2024

== South Asians ==
Note: South Asians include those of Indian, Pakistani, Sri Lankan, Nepalese or Bangladeshi ancestry First South Asian MP

- David Ochterlony Dyce Sombre, MP for Sudbury from July 1841 to April 1842.

First South Asian Cabinet member

- Sajid Javid, Conservative Secretary of State for Culture, Media and Sport 2014–15, then Secretary of State for Business, Innovation and Skills (2015–2016), Secretary of State for Communities and Local Government (2016–18), Home Secretary (2018–19), Chancellor of the Exchequer (2019–20) and Secretary of State for Health and Social Care (2021–22).

Javid, who is of Pakistani descent, was succeeded as Chancellor of the Exchequer by Rishi Sunak, who is of Indian descent. This was the first time that someone from an ethnic minority had been succeeded in one of the Great Offices of State by another person from that category.

First South Asian member of the Welsh Assembly

- Mohammad 'Oscar' Asghar, Conservative AM for South Wales East 2007–20

First South Asian member of the Scottish Parliament

- Bashir Ahmad, Scottish National Party MSP for Glasgow, 2007–09

First South Asian minister in the Scottish Government

- Humza Yousaf, SNP Minister for Europe and International Development (2012–2016), then Minister for Transport and the Islands (2016–2018), then Cabinet Secretary for Justice (2018–2021), then Cabinet Secretary for Health and Social Care, (2021–2023)

First South Asian first minister of Scotland

- Humza Yousaf, SNP first minister, 2023–24

First female South Asian MP

- Rushanara Ali, Labour MP for Bethnal Green and Bow, 2010–present
- Priti Patel, Conservative MP for Witham 2010–present (and first female Hindu MP; also Home Secretary 2019–22)

First MP of Burmese descent

- Paul Scully, Conservative MP for Sutton and Cheam 2015–2024

First South Asian prime minister of the United Kingdom

Rishi Sunak is the first person of colour to hold the office of prime minister

- Rishi Sunak, Conservative prime minister 2022–2024

== Jews ==
First Jewish prime minister

- Benjamin Disraeli MP, Conservative Party prime minister in 1868 and 1874-1880

Second Jewish MP

- Lionel de Rothschild, Liberal MP for City of London, 1847–68

First female Jewish MP

- Marion Phillips, Labour MP for Sunderland, 1929–31

First Jewish Speaker of the House of Commons

- John Bercow, 2009–19

== Muslims ==
First Muslim MP

- Mohammad Sarwar, Labour MP for Glasgow Central, 1997–2010

First female Muslim MPs

- Rushanara Ali, Labour MP for Bethnal Green and Bow, 2010–present
- Shabana Mahmood, Labour MP for Birmingham Ladywood, 2010–present
- Yasmin Qureshi, Labour MP for Bolton South East, 2010–present

First hijab-wearing Muslim MP

- Apsana Begum, Labour MP for Poplar and Limehouse, 2019–present

First Muslim member of the Scottish Parliament

- Bashir Ahmad, Scottish National Party MSP for Glasgow, 2007–09

First Muslim minister in the Scottish Government

- Humza Yousaf, SNP Minister for Europe and International Development (2012–2016), then Minister for Transport and the Islands (2016–2018), then Cabinet Secretary for Justice (2018–2021), then Cabinet Secretary for Health and Social Care, (from 2021)

First Muslim First Minister of Scotland

- Humza Yousaf, SNP First Minister, 2023–24

== Hindus ==
First Hindu MP

- Shailesh Vara, Conservative MP for North West Cambridgeshire, 2005–24

First Hindu cabinet minister

- Priti Patel, Secretary of State for International Development, 2016–17

First Hindu prime minister

- Rishi Sunak, Conservative prime minister 2022–24

== Sikhs ==
First Sikh MP

- Piara Khabra, Labour MP for Ealing Southall, 1992–2007

First female Sikh MP

- Preet Gill, Labour Co-op MP for Birmingham Edgbaston, 2017–present

First turban-wearing Sikh MP

- Tanmanjeet Singh Dhesi, Labour MP for Slough, 2017–present

First female Sikh council leader

- Satvir Kaur, Labour leader of Southampton City Council, 2022–present

== Buddhists ==
First Buddhist MP

- Suella Braverman, Conservative MP for Fareham, 2015–present

== Zoroastrians ==
First Zoroastrian MP

- Dadabhai Naoroji, Liberal MP for Finsbury Central, 1892–95

== LGBT+ people ==
First openly lesbian MP: Maureen Colquhoun, Labour MP for Northampton North, 1974-79 (outed before coming out)

First openly lesbian MSP: Margaret Smith, Liberal Democrat MSP for Edinburgh West, 1999-2011

First openly gay MP (and first openly gay Cabinet minister): Chris Smith, Labour MP for Islington South and Finsbury, from 1983 to 2005 and National Heritage/Culture secretary, 1997-2001

First openly gay member of the House of Lords: Waheed Alli, Baron Alli, Labour member of the House of Lords, 1998–present (came out in 1999)

First openly bisexual MP: Simon Hughes, Liberal Democrat MP for Bermondsey and Old Southwark, 1983–2015 (outed before coming out, came out in 2006)

First openly bisexual MSP: Patrick Harvie, Scottish Green MSP for Glasgow, 2003-Present

First openly transgender MP: Jamie Wallis, Conservative MP for Bridgend, 2019–24 (came out in March 2022)

First openly transgender MSPs: Iris Duane and Q Manivannan, Scottish Green MSPs for Glasgow and Edinburgh and Lothians East respectively, 2026-Present

First openly transgender MEP: Nikki Sinclaire, United Kingdom Independence Party (later Independent) MEP for the West Midlands from 2009 – 2014. Sinclaire stepped down shortly after coming out in 2013.

First openly lesbian member of the House of Lords: Deborah Stedman-Scott, Baroness Stedman-Scott, Conservative member of the House of Lords, 2010–present

First openly lesbian Cabinet minister: Justine Greening, Secretary of State for International Development, 2012–16 (came out in 2016)

First openly pansexual MP: Layla Moran, Liberal Democrat MP for Oxford West and Abingdon, from 2017–present (came out in 2020)

First openly gay member of the Northern Ireland Assembly:

- John Blair, Alliance MLA for South Antrim, 2018–present (co-opted to the seat, re-elected in subsequent elections)
- Eóin Tennyson, Alliance MLA for Upper Bann, 2022–present (elected)

== See also ==
- List of electoral firsts in Canada
- List of electoral firsts in New Zealand
