= Mete Kīngi Paetahi =

New Zealand politician (c. 1813–1883)

Mete Paetahi
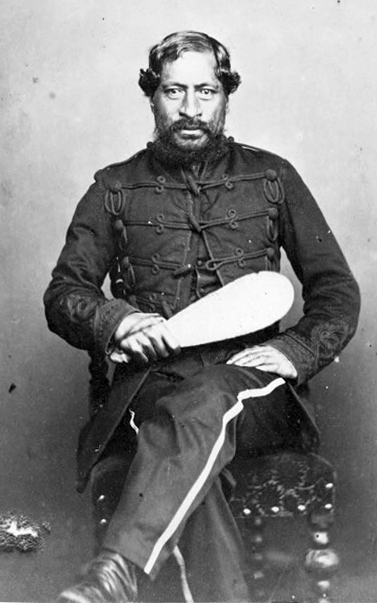
- Formal seated portrait photograph of Mete Kīngi Paetahi, one of the first four Māori MPs, wearing a uniform and holding a patu

Member of the New Zealand Parliament for Western Maori
- In office 1868–1870

Personal details
- Born: c. 1813 New Zealand
- Died: 22 September 1883 Putiki, Wanganui, New Zealand
- Profession: Māori chief, politician

Mete Kīngi Te Rangi Paetahi (c. 1813 – 22 September 1883) was a Member of Parliament in New Zealand. He was one of four Māori elected in the first Māori elections of 1868 for the new Māori electorates in the House of Representatives.

== Private life ==
Mete Kīngi was the chief of the Ngāti Poutama (or Ngā Poutama) and Ngāti Tūmango hapu of Te Āti Haunui-a-Pāpārangi in the Whanganui River area. His father was Paetahi and his mother Utaora. He opposed the Pai Mārire (Hauhau) movement in the 1860s and fought against the Hauhau, becoming known popularly as 'General Mete Kīngi'. When Hōri Kīngi Te Ānaua died in September 1868, Mete Kīngi succeeded him as the highest-ranking chief in the tribes of the lower Wanganui.

== Political career ==
New Zealand Parliament
Years	Term	Electorate	Party
1868–1870	4th	Western Maori	Independent

Mete Kīngi was the only candidate proposed at the nomination meeting for Western Maori, one of the new Māori electorates, at the Wanganui Courthouse in 1868, and was thus elected unopposed. As he had a salaried position as Assessor for the Crown, a special act, the Mete Kingi Paetahi Election Act, 1868, was required to validate his election.

He represented the electorate from 1868 to 1870. He contested it again at the 1871 general election, but was defeated by Wiremu Parata, coming last of the three candidates.

== Notes ==
New Zealand Parliament
New constituency	Member of Parliament for Western Maori; 1868–1870	Succeeded by Wiremu Parata
