= Māori electorates =

Electoral districts for Māori voters in New Zealand

There have been seven Māori electorates in each general election since 2008.

A Māori electorate (officially a Māori electoral district and colloquially a Māori seat; Māori: ngā tūru Māori) is a geographic constituency used for electing a member (MP) to represent the Māori people in the New Zealand Parliament. Māori electorates are a type of reserved seat, in contrast to general electorates for the representation of all others.

Since 1867, every part of the country has been covered by both a general and a Māori electorate. Originally intended as a temporary measure and a concession to the Māori people by the European settlers who controlled the New Zealand government, the Māori electorates have endured despite other constitutional reforms and have become a distinctive feature of the politics of New Zealand.

To be qualified to vote in a Māori electorate, people need to declare that they are of Māori descent. They must also, in common with general electorates, be qualified as an elector and live within the boundary of the seat. The Electoral Commission maintains two separate electoral rolls (the Maori electoral roll and the general electoral roll) and eligible voters may change between them at almost any time. A requirement that candidates be Māori was dropped in 1967.

As of 2026, there are seven Māori electorates. Since the boundary review conducted ahead of the 1996 general election, the number of Māori electorates has been relative to the number of general electorates for the proportion of voters on each electoral roll. Prior to this election, however, the seats generally provided for the underrepresentation of Māori.

== History ==
=== Early attempts at Māori representation ===
The first New Zealand Parliament was elected in 1853 and responsible government was obtained in the subsequent term. To be able to vote for a member of Parliament, an elector had to be male, be a subject of the monarch, have title to land worth at least 25 pounds, and not be in prison. The property-ownership requirement was a barrier to Māori voting because the land they owned was held in common and not by Crown grant; native title was not accepted as a way to assert a right to the franchise. There was concern, however, that these rules ran contrary to Article III of the Treaty of Waitangi which made all Māori subjects of the monarch with corresponding voting and representation rights.

Māori were not then a minority of the population of New Zealand. Provincial statistics from 1853 reported 31,272 Europeans and 56,400 Māori. However, they had been seen by Governor Grey as, in Paul Moon's description, "obstacles to the civilised advancement of the colony." Moon reports that the New Zealand Constitution Act 1852 allowed for "a degree" of Māori political autonomy and for Māori to live as they always had done in certain parts of the country, but political leaders like William Fox and John Godley believed Māori would soon be extinct and should not be given rights.

None of the first three parliaments included any Māori members and discussions in Parliament assumed that Europeans could provide representation for Māori who were "not yet sufficiently educated" to be elected. However, Māori representation was identified as a means to pacify Māori and quell emerging separatist movements.

In the third parliament, James FitzGerald sought the fair representation of Māori in both the House of Representatives and Legislative Council, but his motion in August 1862 failed 20–17. A select committee inquiry in 1863 recommended that two electorates be created for Māori. These did not eventuate, but three reserved seats for gold miners (Gold Fields, Gold Field Towns and Westland Boroughs) were created in 1862, 1865 and 1866. FitzGerald's views on Māori representation were explained in an 1865 letter to James Crowe Richmond, a member of the Legislative Council:

1. To expect men to respect law who don't enjoy it is absurd. 2. To try and govern a folk by our courts and at the same time to say that our courts shall take no cognisance of their property is amazing folly. Two-thirds of the Northern Island is held under a tenure which is ignored by our law. Is it possible to govern any people by a law which does not recognize their estate in land?

— James FitzGerald, Letter to J. C. Richmond, 25 August 1865

In 1865, Newton MP George Graham moved unsuccessfully for a universal male franchise for Māori (if Graham had been successful, Māori could have voted for five European members tasked with specifically representing Māori). FitzGerald, now Minister for Native Affairs, avoided making changes to the franchise and instead created a system for individualising Māori land titles so that Māori men could meet the property-ownership requirement. He also established a Native Commission that included membership of 35 Māori and five Europeans. The premier Frederick Weld hoped FizGerald's Commission would become a "kind of constituent assembly" of Māori chiefs, but it was never fully implemented and was quickly abandoned after the collapse of the Weld ministry by incoming minister Andrew Russell.

=== 1867 establishment ===
Māori representation was granted during the term of the 4th Parliament. Napier MP Donald McLean introduced the Maori Representation Bill with the purpose of enfranchising Māori who were indirectly excluded from voting by the land ownership requirement and providing for four Māori electorates. The bill passed after a lengthy debate during a period of warfare between the government and some North Island Māori hapū. It was seen as a way to reduce conflict between cultures.

The Act originally agreed to set up four electorates specially for Māori; three in the North Island and one covering the whole South Island. The four seats were a fairly modest concession on a per-capita basis at the time. Fair representation proportionate to the size of settler electorates, which each served around 3,500 people, would have entitled the then 60,000 Māori to 20 seats. However, the number four was selected to restore an equality of representatives between the two islands that had been disrupted by the addition of further gold miners' electorates. FitzGerald and others regarded the concessions given to Māori as insufficient, while others disagreed. In the end, the setting up of Māori electorates separate from existing electorates and without significant ability for political influence assuaged the conservative opposition to the bill. The first Māori elections were held in the following year and the new members entered the 4th Parliament mid-term. Māori elections continued to be held separately from general elections until 1951, usually one day prior.

Moon records reaction of Māori communities to the establishment of the seats as "not one of unreserved enthusiasm." Government reports from 1868 identified apathy and indifference. In the first Māori elections held that year, two members were elected unopposed and a third by a show of hands. It was suggested that either Māori did not understand the benefits of representation, or the pan-tribal nature of the Māori electorates and the imposed, artificial boundaries did not support trust in the system. Māori MPs' low level of influence may also have been a factor. Sociologist Augie Fleras describes the introduction of Māori representation not as an act of benevolence but as "a politically deceptive strategy of indirect control which ... gerrymandered [Māori] to the point where they became, and remained, a permanently outvoted minority in a political system designed to suit majority interests."

The historian Alan Ward described the seats as having "stumbled into being." They were intended as a temporary measure lasting five years, giving specific representation to Māori until the land ownership issue was resolved. However, they were extended in 1872 and sunset clauses were removed in 1876. Fleras identifies the removal of the property qualification in 1893 as the moment when Māori electorates became enduring. Despite numerous attempts to dismantle Māori electorates, they continue to form a distinctive feature of the New Zealand political system.

== Electorate boundaries ==
=== Until 1996 ===
The first four Māori electorates were named after compass points and existed for 129 years. Northern Māori ran from Cape Reinga to the Manukau Harbour. Western Māori and Eastern Māori divided the rest of the North Island, meeting at the Ruahine Range. Southern Māori was for the entire South Island. The electorate populations were not balanced and do not appear to have been initially recorded. Political scientist Alan McRobie approximated that after the March 1874 census there would have been about 16–17,000 people in Eastern Māori and Western Māori, about 10,000 in Northern Māori, and less than 2,000 in Southern Māori. Balance between Māori and European representation, or between each of the Māori electorates, was not considered for some time and few changes were made between 1867 and 1996. During this time, the number of total electorates increased from 76 to 99 but the number of Māori electorates remained fixed at four. The number of electorates was originally intended to restore equality between the number of electorates across both islands, but was also a deliberate attempt to underrepresent Māori.

The boundary between Western Māori and Eastern Māori was adjusted for the 1919 election and the Chatham Islands Māori population was included in Western Māori from 1922. By the 1951 census, only 3,959 Māori were recorded in the South Island compared to 111,512 in the North Island, who continued to be divided unevenly between the three electorates. For the 1954 election, the northern boundary for Southern Māori was extended into the North Island, picking up the cities of Wellington, Masterton, Palmerston North and Napier. These boundary changes were made by Acts of Parliament. Eruera Tirikātene unsuccessfully sought to increase the number of electorates to five and have the number of seats fluctuate in proportion to general seats in 1965.

It was not until the boundary redistribution for the 1984 election that the impartial Representation Commission which had historically drawn general electorate boundaries was given responsibility for Māori electorates. By this time Māori had for eight years been able to change to the general roll so the Māori electorates came to be for those opting into separate representation. The Commission received calls to adopt Māori names for the electorates, but was not able to do so. The Commission was also unable to increase the number of seats, but for the first time the populations in each electorate were near-equal with approximately 35,000 people represented by each electorate. While the four seats had coincidentally provided proportionate representation in the late 1980s, the Commission's chairman wrote in his 1992 report on representation arrangements that there was now sufficient population for a fifth electorate and "legislative amendment should seriously be considered." This was achieved with the adoption of the Electoral Act 1993 alongside New Zealand's move to the mixed-member proportional (MMP) electoral system.

During this period, the Māori electorates were the primary mechanism for Māori to be elected to Parliament. By 1 October 1993, the 140th anniversary of the first election to the New Zealand, only six Māori (the former Eastern Māori MP James Carroll, Rex Austin, Ben Couch, Winston Peters, Ian Peters and Clem Simich) had been elected through the general electorates.

=== Since 1996 ===
Electorates in the 1996 election (Māori seats shown bottom-right)

With the introduction of the MMP electoral system after 1993, the rules regarding the Māori electorates changed. Today, the number of electorates floats, meaning that the electoral population of a Māori seat can remain roughly equivalent to that of a general seat. The calculation for the number of electorates is:

$\mathsf{\text{Number of Māori electorates}=\frac\text{Māori electoral population}\text{quota for South Island general electorates}}$

The quota for South Island general electorates is found by dividing the South Island general electoral population by 16, which is the fixed number of electorates for the South Island. The quota represents the approximate number of people, plus or minus 5 per cent, who should be contained in each electorate. The Māori electoral population is calculated to include a proportion of unregistered Māori adults and children, not just people who choose the Māori roll.

For the 1996 election, the first under MMP, the Electoral Commission defined five Māori electorates, for the first time with Māori names: Te Puku O Te Whenua (The belly of the land), Te Tai Hauauru (The western district), Te Tai Rawhiti (The eastern district), Te Tai Tokerau (The northern district), and Te Tai Tonga (The southern district).

A sixth Māori electorate was added for the second MMP election in 1999, with compensatory boundary changes to ensure the electorates still covered an equal population: the new electorates Hauraki, Ikaroa-Rawhiti, and Waiariki joined Te Tai Hauāuru, Te Tai Tokerau and Te Tai Tonga.

Since 2002, there have been seven Māori electorates which have used the same names since 2008. From north to south they are:

1. Te Tai Tokerau – northernmost seat, including Whangārei, northern Auckland and parts of western Auckland.
2. Tāmaki Makaurau – southern and central Auckland, and parts of western Auckland.
3. Hauraki-Waikato – north-western North Island, including Hamilton and Papakura (replaced Tainui in 2008).
4. Waiariki – includes Tauranga, Whakatāne, Rotorua, Taupō.
5. Ikaroa-Rāwhiti – eastern and southern North Island, including Gisborne and Masterton.
6. Te Tai Hauāuru – western and southern North Island, including Taranaki and Manawatū-Whanganui regions, Kapiti and Porirua.
7. Te Tai Tonga – all of the South Island, Stewart Island, the Chatham Islands, and most of Wellington.

While seven out of 72 (9.7%) does not nearly reflect the proportion of voting-age New Zealanders who identify as being of Māori descent (about 14.8%), many Māori choose to enrol in general electorates, so the proportion reflects the proportion of voters on the Māori roll. In 2022, Kōtuitui: New Zealand Journal of Social Sciences Online published research showing "Māori who also identify as Pākehā are less likely to opt for the Māori roll, but those who know their iwi, are comfortable in Māori social surroundings, feel a spiritual connection to land and the presence of their ancestors in their lives, or feel the drive to be respected as Indigenous, are more likely to choose the Māori roll."

Māori Party co-leader Pita Sharples proposed in 2007 the creation of an additional Māori electorate for Māori living in Australia; there are between 115,000 and 125,000 Māori in Australia, the majority living in Queensland. It was claimed in 2026 that there was sufficient population for an eighth electorate although this was not reached in time for the boundary review completed in 2025.

== Politics and representation ==
=== Early representatives ===
New Zealand did not have defined political parties until the late 19th century. The first four Māori members of parliament, elected in 1868, were all independents. Tāreha Te Moananui (Eastern Maori), Frederick Nene Russell (Northern Maori) and John Patterson (Southern Maori) all retired in 1870 and Mete Kīngi Te Rangi Paetahi (Western Maori) was defeated in 1871. These four men were also the first New Zealand-born members of the New Zealand Parliament. The second four members were the independents Karaitiana Takamoana (Eastern Maori), Wi Katene (Northern Maori), Hōri Kerei Taiaroa (Southern Maori), and Wiremu Parata (Western Maori).

Early representatives were reported to have struggled verbally or politically and had little influence. Raewyn Dalziel wrote that Māori MPs were often taken advantage of by European MPs. As Augie Fleras wrote, "the members of the House tended to treat Māori representatives with barely concealed disdain, refusing to acknowledge them as anything but a token contribution to the political life of the nation." However, all four Māori members would sit on the Māori affairs committee and exercised influence there.

The first Māori woman MP was Iriaka Rātana, who represented Western Maori from 1949 to 1969. Like Elizabeth McCombs, New Zealand's first woman MP, Rātana won the seat in a by-election caused by the death of her husband Matiu.

=== Party politics ===
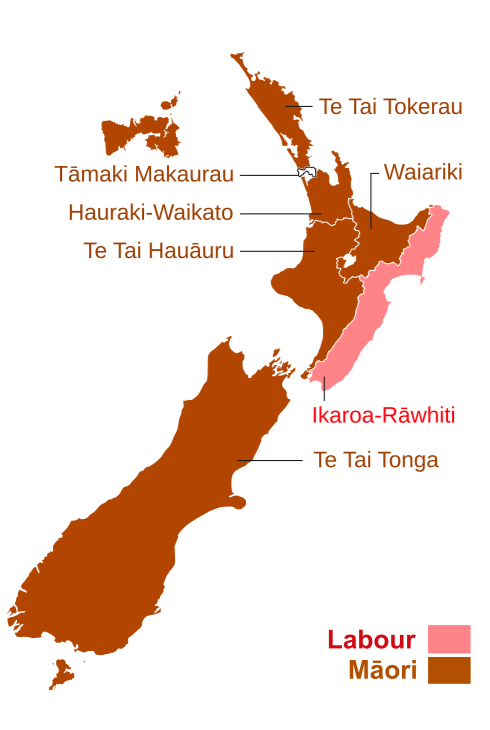
Party representation in the Māori seats following the most recent general election, in 2023

When the Liberal Party formed, however, Māori MPs began to align themselves with the new organisation, with either Liberal candidates or Liberal sympathisers as representatives. Māori MPs in the Liberal Party included James Carroll, Āpirana Ngata and Te Rangi Hīroa. There were also Māori MPs in the more conservative and rural Reform Party; Māui Pōm, Taurekareka Hēnare and Taite Te Tomo.

The Labour Party dominated the Māori electorates in the two-party era of 1935 to 1996. Initially and for a long period this dominance owed much to Labour's alliance with the Rātana Church. The prophet T. W. Ratana saw the unification of Māori aspirations with a common policy platform and an established political party as prerequisite for Māori to have an influence in government. The Rātana influence has diminished at times although Labour's senior Māori MP and former Speaker Adrian Rurawhe was closely associated with the Rātana Church and is the grandson of former MPs Matiu and Iriaka Rātana. With Rātana's endorsement, Labour won three Māori electorates in the 1938 election and all four for the first time in the 1943 election. Sir Āpirana Ngata's 1938–43 term remains the last time a National Party candidate won a Māori seat; Labour won every Māori electorate in each election through 1990.

In the 1993 election, Tau Henare of New Zealand First won Northern Māori; his party captured all five Māori electorates in the 1996 election. Labour regained all the Māori electorates in the following 1999 election and held them until 2004 when its dominance was challenged by the Māori Party.

Te Tai Hauāuru MP Tariana Turia quit Labour over the foreshore and seabed controversy in 2004 and returned to parliament the same year leading the new Māori Party which she co-founded. Her party won four seats in 2005 and five in 2008, before gradually losing its electorates to Labour over time and winning no seats in 2017. However, in the 2023 general election, the rebranded Te Pāti Māori won a record six of the seven Māori electorates, unseating Labour from all but one of the seats. Because the number of electorates won by Te Pāti Māori in 2023 was greater than the number it won through the party vote, an overhang was created. The ability for Māori electorates to create an overhang means they can be perceived as strategically significant.

== Electorate characteristics and election rules ==
=== Electorate characteristics ===
Māori electoral boundaries are superimposed over the electoral boundaries used for general electorates; thus every part of New Zealand simultaneously belongs both in a general seat and in a Māori seat. Given that the Māori electoral population is a minority, the geographical size of the Māori electoral boundaries varies significantly from the general electorates. Five to 18 general electorates fit into any one Māori electorate. Since the 1984 general election, boundaries for the Māori electorates have been drawn at the same time as general electorate boundaries.

Contemporary Māori electorates are equivalent to general electorates. The chief distinction is that electors of Māori electorates must declare they are of Māori descent (see Māori people § Demographics) and choose to place their names on a separate Māori electoral roll rather than on the general electoral roll. Voters on the Māori roll may not vote for general roll candidates. Because of this, and the way that Māori electorate boundaries are drawn so that they cover the same population as general electorates, the one person, one vote rule applies. The primary political difference is that candidates are regarded as requiring the skills to engage with their constituencies and ensure a clear line of accountability to representing the 'Māori voice'. This includes proficiency in te reo Māori, knowledge of tikanga Māori, whakawhanaungatanga skills and confidence on the marae.

=== Voting ===
Currently Māori elections are held as part of New Zealand general elections, but in the past such elections took place separately, on different days (usually the day before the vote for general electorates) and under different rules. Historically, less organisation went into holding Māori elections than general elections, and the process received fewer resources. Māori electorates at first did not require registration for voting, which was later introduced. New practices such as paper ballots (as opposed to casting one's vote verbally) and secret ballots also came later to elections for Māori electorates (1937) than to general electorates (1870).

The authorities frequently delayed or overlooked reforms of the Māori electoral system, with Parliament considering the Māori electorates as largely unimportant. During the brief period of two-round voting from 1908 to 1913, the Second Ballot Act applied to general electorates only, and not to the four Māori electorates. The gradual improvement of Māori elections owes much to long-serving Māori MP Eruera Tirikatene, who himself experienced problems in his own election. From the election of 1951 onwards, the voting for Māori and general electorates was held on the same day.

Confusion around the Māori electorates during the 2017 general election was revealed in a number of complaints to the Electoral Commission. Complaints included Electoral Commission staff at polling booths being unaware of the Māori roll and insisting electors were unregistered when their names did not appear on the general roll; Electoral Commission staff giving incorrect information about the Māori electorates; electors being given incorrect voting forms and electors being told they were unable to vote for the Māori Party unless they were on the Māori roll.

=== Māori Electoral Option ===
Between 1975 and 2023, registered Māori electors had the opportunity to choose whether they are included on the Māori or general electoral rolls. Before 1975, registration was based on blood quantum. Māori were limited to being on the Māori roll although "half-castes" (as the law described them) could choose between either roll from 1896. Roll changes were limited to a three-month period after each five-yearly census. Now, Māori electors can change rolls at any time, except in the three months preceding a general or local election or after a notice of vacancy is issued for a by-election. Each five-yearly census and Māori Electoral Option determines the number of Māori electorates for the next one or two elections. Māori who are on the Māori roll will also vote in Māori wards or constituencies in local government elections, if their local council provides separate Māori representation.

In June 2022, the Justice Minister Kris Faafoi of the incumbent Labour Party introduced a bill to allow people of Māori descent to switch between the general and Māori electoral rolls at any time. At the time, Māori were only allowed to switch between the two rolls every five years. To pass into law, the bill needed 75% majority support in Parliament. Coincidentally, private members' bills from Green MP Golriz Ghahraman and Māori Party co-leader Rawiri Waititi introduced similar but broader reforms at the same time (both were lost). Labour's bill was passed when the National Party abandoned its opposition, subject to Labour's agreement to prevent roll switching in the three months before general and local elections. Labour and National together provided the 75% majority need to pass the bill into law.

The Electoral (Māori Electoral Option) Legislation Act 2022 came into force on 31 March 2023; allowing people of Māori descent to switch between the general and Māori rolls at anytime until the three-month period before elections. The Electoral Commission subsequently launched a campaign to encourage non-voters to register with either the general or Māori rolls. For the 2023 New Zealand general election, the cutoff date was set at midnight 13 July 2023. By 3 July 2023, over 12,000 people had switched between the Māori and general rolls; with 6,662 people shifting from the general to Māori rolls and 5,652 switching vice versa. Political expert and academic Rawiri Taonui and journalist Tommy de Silva described the increase of voters on the Māori roll as a form of strategic voting that reinforced the relevance of the Māori seats and Māori vote to New Zealand politics.

By 11 July 2025, the Electoral Commission confirmed that almost 31,000 voters had switched to the Māori electoral roll while over 25,000 first time voters had registered with the Māori roll. By contrast, about 20,000 Māori descent voters had switched to the general roll while 17,000 new Māori voters had registered with the general roll. The Electoral Commission credited the 2022 law change with removing a barrier for Māori voters and boosting their electoral engagement. Research published in 2025 showed that half of Māori choose to vote on the Māori electoral roll and did so because they valued Māori representation, saw the seats as an expression of their identity, or made a strategic choice.

On 31 July 2025, Te Pāti Māori filed urgent High Court proceedings calling on the Electoral Commission, Ministry of Justice and the Ombudsman to investigate reports that Māori voters had been removed from the Māori electoral roll or shifted to the general roll without their consent.

== Calls for abolition or reform ==
There have been calls for the abolition of the Māori electorates, typically from political parties and organisations positioned on the political right. At the same time, parties on the political left have sought greater protection for the Māori electorates.

=== Mid-20th century ===
In 1953, re-alignment of Māori electoral boundaries occurred. In the 1950s the practice of reserving electorates for Māori was described by some politicians "as a form of 'apartheid', like in South Africa".

In 1967, the electoral system whereby four electorate seats were reserved for representatives who were specifically Māori ended. Following the Electoral Amendment Act 1967, the 100-year-old disqualification preventing Europeans from standing as candidates in Māori electorates was removed. Simultaneously, the act allowed Māori to stand in general electorates.

In 1976, the National Government introduced the option for Māori to decide whether to enrol individually on the general electoral roll or the Māori roll. A large number of people (Māori and non-Māori) failed to fill out an electoral re-registration card that was distributed with the 1976 census, with census staff lacking authority to insist on the card being completed. This had little practical effect for non-Māori, but it transferred Māori to the general roll if the card was not handed in.

The Royal Commission on the Electoral System's 1986 report Towards a Better Democracy proposed abolishing the Māori electorates, with Māori parties instead receiving representation even if they did not pass the 4 per cent representation threshold proposed for mixed member proportional representation. In the implementation of the report through the Electoral Act 1993, Māori electorates were retained and the threshold was raised to 5 per cent.

In 1994 the Waitangi Tribunal inquired into the claim "that the Crown has an obligation under the Treaty of Waitangi to protect the right of Māori to be represented in Parliament and that there are special needs in promoting Māori enrolment and education on the option." This followed the Government's decision not to extensively promote the 1993 Māori electoral option. The Tribunal held that separate Māori representation is an article 2 right under the Treaty of Waitangi and found that the Crown has an obligation to actively protect Māori citizenship and political representation rights under article 3 of the Treaty. The High Court largely concurred later that year but declined to rule that the Crown had acted with "substantial unfairness."

=== 21st century ===
The National Party has opposed Māori electorates for much of the 21st century and did not stand candidates in Māori electorates between 2005 and 2020. In 2023, leader Christopher Luxon said under "one person one vote... [keeping the Māori electorates] doesn’t make a lot of sense in our view." Several of his predecessors had also stated their opposition. In 2003, Bill English said that "the purpose of the Māori seats has come to an end." In 2004 party leader Don Brash called the electorates an "anachronism". Brash later formed the lobby group Hobson's Pledge which advocates abolishing the allocated Māori electorates, seeing them as outdated. In 2008 under John Key, National announced it would abolish the electorates when all historic treaty settlements have been resolved, which it aimed to complete by 2014. However, in 2014 Key ruled out abolition, saying he would not do it even if he had the numbers to do so as there would be "hikois from hell". Judith Collins is one leader who resiled from the party's historic views, saying in 2020 "I am not opposed to the Māori seats ... I just want people to feel that they all have opportunities for representation".

The ACT Party opposes the Māori electorates. Its leader, David Seymour, has called for their abolition as recently as 2019. Whereas some parties have suggested holding a referendum to remove the Māori electorates, ACT has said it would legislate without a referendum.

New Zealand First, whose "Tight Five" once held all Māori seats but has not contested the Māori electorates since 1999, has advocated for abolition of the separate electorates, while emphasising that the decision should be made by Māori voters. During the 2017 election campaign, party leader Winston Peters announced that if elected his party would hold a binding referendum on whether Māori electorates should be abolished. During post-election negotiations with the Labour Party, Peters indicated that he would consider dropping his call for a referendum on the Māori electorates due to the defeat of the Māori Party at the 2017 election. When Labour and New Zealand First formed a coalition government after the election, New Zealand First dropped its demand for the referendum. In 2026, New Zealand First returned to campaigning on a referendum to abolish the seats, arguing they were racially divisive and no longer needed as a substantial proportion of MPs were Māori (27%), and four of the six parliamentary parties had Māori leaders.

Labour, the Green Party and Te Pāti Māori have all supported legislation to entrench the Māori electorates so they cannot be easily repealed. Some provisions of New Zealand electoral law require either a 75% majority in Parliament or a successful national referendum (by simple majority) to be amended. The existence of general electorates is entrenched, but the existence of Māori electorates is not. Entrenchment of the Māori electorates is supported by the Human Rights Commission. The most recent attempt to entrench the Māori electorates passed its first reading in 2018 with the support of Labour, New Zealand First and the Green Party, but failed at its second reading in 2019 when New Zealand First withdrew its support.

== International influence ==
Within New Zealand, Māori electorates were localised as Māori wards and Māori constituencies for local government in 2002. Internationally, the scheme has inspired other solutions for underrepresented indigenous peoples.

=== Australia ===
In 1995, MLC Franca Arena moved the Parliament of New South Wales to an inquiry and report on the idea of providing seats dedicated to people of Aboriginal background, modelled on the Māori electorates, to improve the representation of Indigenous Australians in that parliament. The Standing Committee on Social Issues, of which she was not part, released a report on the merits of the system in November 1998. The report is said to have been well-researched, with a thorough discussion of the system's mechanics, and through which paths it could come to fruition. The NSW Government members, however, did not conclude the proposal appropriate and leaned towards other measures to facilitate Aboriginal representation.

Another report was released in 2003 by the Legislative Assembly of Queensland's Legal, Constitutional and Administrative Review Committee, as part of an inquiry on how to improve indigenous self-determination. The idea of dedicated seats in the State Parliament, while deemed to have potential to assist reconciliation efforts, was not recommended in the final report due to strong opposition from some members of the committee.

== See also ==
- Māori politics
- New Zealand elections
- Māori King Movement
- 2025 New Zealand local referendums on Māori wards and constituencies
