= Party whip (New Zealand) =

Political official to ensure party discipline

In the New Zealand Parliament, political parties appoint party whips to ensure party discipline and attendance, help manage legislative business, and carry out a variety of other functions on behalf of the party leadership. Whips also have an administrative role to prepare lists of members from their party to speak in debates and ask oral questions of ministers in the chamber.

== History ==
In New Zealand, the concept of a whip was inherited from British parliamentary politics. All political parties that have four or more members in Parliament have at least one party whip. Parties with 25 to 44 members are allowed two whips (one senior and one junior), and parties with 45 or more members are entitled to three whips (one senior and two junior). Only four parties (Liberal, Reform, Labour and National) have ever had more than one whip. A whip does not necessarily have to represent a single party and groups of MPs (of four of more) outside a party with a whip may appoint their own. This happened in 1983 when the Social Credit Party's two MPs (Bruce Beetham and Gary Knapp) combined with former Labour MPs turned independent (Brian MacDonell and John Kirk) to appoint their own whip (MacDonell) and boost their recognition in parliament.

Whips act in an administrative role, making sure members of their party are in the debating chamber when required and organising members of their party to speak during debates. Since the introduction of proportional representation in 1996, divisions that require all members in the chamber to vote by taking sides (termed a personal vote) are rarely used, except for conscience votes. Instead, one of the party's whips votes on behalf of all the members of their party, by declaring how many members are in favour and/or how many members are opposed. They also cast proxy votes for single-member parties whose member is not in the chamber at the time of the vote, and also cast proxy votes during personal votes for absent members of their parties and for absent members of associated single-member parties.

Some parties use an alternative title than whip, though the role is identical in all but name. The Alliance used the term 'parliamentary coordinator' rather than whip. The Green Party uses the term 'musterer'. Since 2020 Te Pāti Māori has referred to its whip as a 'matarau'.

== List of whips ==
=== Current parties ===
==== Labour ====
Senior whip

Junior whip

The Labour Party is one of the parties that has qualified for second whip, known as a junior whip.

No.	Name	Term of office	
1	Ted Howard	10 March 1921	16 June 1926
2	James McCombs	16 June 1926	4 December 1928
(1)	Ted Howard	4 December 1928	5 December 1935
3	Robert McKeen	5 December 1935	11 June 1936
4	Arthur Shapton Richards	11 June 1936	13 September 1937
5	James O'Brien	13 September 1937	11 May 1939
(4)	Arthur Shapton Richards	11 May 1939	2 December 1942
6	David Coleman	2 December 1942	13 May 1947
7	Robert Macfarlane	13 May 1947	19 September 1947
8	Phil Connolly	19 September 1947	27 June 1951
9	Joe Cotterill	27 June 1951	10 July 1952
10	John Mathison	10 July 1952	9 January 1958
11	Ritchie Macdonald	9 January 1958	2 December 1966
12	Ron Bailey	2 December 1966	29 November 1972
13	Jonathan Hunt	29 November 1972	6 September 1974
14	Trevor Young	6 September 1974	5 May 1978
15	Richard Prebble	5 May 1978	13 February 1980
16	Stan Rodger	13 February 1980	19 July 1984
17	Fran Wilde	19 July 1984	18 August 1987
18	Trevor Mallard	18 August 1987	8 February 1990
19	Judy Keall	8 February 1990	31 October 1990
20	Elizabeth Tennet	31 October 1990	13 December 1993
21	Larry Sutherland	13 December 1993	20 December 1996
22	Rick Barker	20 December 1996	10 December 1999
23	Chris Carter	10 December 1999	27 July 2002
24	Jill Pettis	27 July 2002	26 February 2004
25	Darren Hughes	26 February 2004	5 November 2007
26	Sue Moroney	5 November 2007	11 November 2008
27	Steve Chadwick	11 November 2008	20 October 2011
28	Darien Fenton	20 December 2011	17 September 2013
29	Iain Lees-Galloway	23 September 2013	23 September 2014
30	Carmel Sepuloni	23 September 2014	27 September 2017
31	Poto Williams	27 September 2017	31 October 2017
32	Kieran McAnulty	7 November 2017	2 November 2020
33	Duncan Webb	2 November 2020	14 June 2022
34	Tangi Utikere	14 June 2022	31 January 2023
35	Shanan Halbert	31 January 2023	14 October 2023
36	Tracey McLellan	31 January 2023	14 October 2023
37	Camilla Belich	7 December 2023	present

==== National ====
Senior whip

Junior whip

The National Party is one of the parties that has qualified for second whip, known as a junior whip.

No.	Name	Term of office	
1	Walter Broadfoot	14 May 1936	12 March 1941
1941–1944: office not in use
2	Tom Macdonald	20 January 1944	4 March 1950
3	Geoff Gerard	4 March 1950	24 November 1954
4	Ernest Aderman	24 November 1954	8 February 1957
5	John Rae	8 February 1957	26 September 1957
6	Jim Barnes	26 September 1957	21 January 1958
7	Jack George	21 January 1958	10 June 1964
8	Alf Allen	10 June 1964	11 February 1967
9	Gordon Grieve	11 February 1967	5 February 1970
10	Richard Harrison	5 February 1970	25 February 1972
11	Venn Young	25 February 1972	7 December 1972
12	Colin McLachlan	7 December 1972	11 July 1974
13	Bill Birch	11 July 1974	22 January 1976
14	Jack Luxton	22 January 1976	1 February 1979
15	Dail Jones	1 February 1979	24 October 1980
16	Don McKinnon	24 October 1980	2 February 1982
17	Michael Cox	2 February 1982	8 August 1985
18	Robin Gray	8 August 1985	11 September 1987
19	Maurice McTigue	11 September 1987	11 February 1990
20	Roger McClay	11 February 1990	28 November 1990
21	John Carter	28 November 1990	30 November 1993
22	Roger Sowry	30 November 1993	3 April 1995
23	Eric Roy	6 April 1995	19 December 1996
24	David Carter	19 December 1996	8 September 1998
25	Gerry Brownlee	8 September 1998	31 January 2001
26	Alec Neill	31 January 2001	12 October 2001
27	Tony Steel	12 October 2001	15 August 2002
28	Lindsay Tisch	15 August 2002	17 September 2005
29	Anne Tolley	11 October 2005	5 December 2006
30	Nathan Guy	5 December 2006	13 February 2008
31	Chris Tremain	13 February 2008	15 June 2009
32	Jo Goodhew	16 June 2009	20 October 2011
33	Louise Upston	20 December 2011	28 January 2013
34	Tim Macindoe	29 January 2013	20 September 2014
35	Jami-Lee Ross	20 September 2014	2 May 2017
36	Barbara Kuriger	2 May 2017	20 March 2018
37	Matt Doocey	20 March 2018	10 November 2020
38	Maureen Pugh	10 November 2020	5 December 2023
39	Suze Redmayne	5 December 2023	present

==== New Zealand First ====
No.	Name	Term of office	
1	Ron Mark	16 December 1996	28 August 2002
2	Peter Brown	28 August 2002	8 November 2008
2008–2011: office not in use
3	Barbara Stewart	16 December 2011	23 September 2017
4	Clayton Mitchell	31 October 2017	17 October 2020
2020–2023: office not in use
5	Jamie Arbuckle	12 December 2023	present

==== ACT New Zealand ====
No.	Name	Term of office	
1	Ken Shirley	1996	19 February 2002
2	Muriel Newman	19 February 2002	14 June 2004
(1)	Ken Shirley	14 June 2004	11 October 2005
3	Heather Roy	11 October 2005	24 November 2009
4	David Garrett	24 November 2009	21 September 2010
5	John Boscawen	21 September 2010	2 May 2011
6	Hilary Calvert	2 May 2011	26 November 2011
2011–2020: office not in use
7	Brooke van Velden	2020	24 November 2023
8	Todd Stephenson	24 November 2023	present

==== Greens ====
No.	Name	Term of office	
1	Ian Ewen-Street	14 December 1999	22 August 2002
2	Rod Donald	22 August 2002	4 November 2005
3	Metiria Turei	4 November 2005	28 March 2009
4	Kennedy Graham	30 March 2009	20 October 2011
5	Gareth Hughes	14 December 2011	7 October 2014
6	David Clendon	7 October 2014	8 August 2017
7	Eugenie Sage	8 August 2017	24 October 2017
(5)	Gareth Hughes	24 October 2017	18 November 2019
8	Chlöe Swarbrick	18 November 2019	23 November 2020
9	Jan Logie	23 November 2020	14 October 2023
10	Ricardo Menéndez March	19 November 2023	present

==== Te Pāti Māori ====
No.	Name	Term of office	
1	Te Ururoa Flavell	7 November 2005	26 November 2011
2011–2020: office not in use
2	Debbie Ngarewa-Packer	16 November 2020	27 November 2023
3	Mariameno Kapa-Kingi	4 December 2023	11 September 2025
(2)	Debbie Ngarewa-Packer	11 September 2025	present

=== Defunct parties ===
==== Liberal ====
Senior whip

Junior whip

The Liberal Party is one of the parties that has qualified for second whip, known as a junior whip.

No.	Name	Term of office	
1	Frederick Fitchett	19 June 1890	26 January 1891
2	William Cowper Smith	26 January 1891	15 June 1891
3	William Hall-Jones	15 June 1891	15 September 1891
4	Charlie Mills	15 September 1891	29 October 1894
5	Benjamin Harris	29 October 1894	4 December 1896
6	James McGowan	8 October 1897	25 June 1900
7	Arthur Morrison	25 June 1900	23 October 1900
8	John Stevens	25 June 1900	20 October 1900
9	Walter Carncross	16 July 1901	30 June 1903
10	Frederick Flatman	30 June 1903	3 July 1904
12	Alexander Hogg	20 July 1904	24 June 1905
13	Alfred Kidd	24 June 1905	3 September 1906
14	James Colvin	3 September 1906	10 December 1909
15	William MacDonald	10 December 1909	30 June 1910
16	Harry Ell	30 June 1910	29 August 1912
17	Āpirana Ngata	29 August 1912	2 July 1915
18	William Dickie	2 July 1915	17 December 1919
1919–1923: office not in use
19	James Horn	7 February 1923	16 July 1924
20	Alfred Ransom	16 July 1924	16 June 1926
1926–1928: office not in use
21	George Black	11 December 1928	17 May 1930
22	Edward Healy	27 June 1930	1 November 1935

==== Reform ====
Senior whip

No.	Name	Term of office	
1	Charles Hardy	11 February 1909	15 February 1912
2	Heaton Rhodes	15 February 1912	10 July 1912
3	David Guthrie	10 July 1912	18 February 1918
4	William Nosworthy	27 February 1918	4 September 1919
5	Richard Bollard	10 September 1919	21 July 1923
6	James Dickson	21 July 1923	18 October 1928
7	John Bitchener	18 October 1928	22 September 1933
8	Jimmy Nash	22 September 1933	15 February 1935
9	Bert Kyle	15 February 1935	14 May 1936

Junior whip

The Reform Party is one of the parties that has qualified for second whip, known as a junior whip.

No.	Name	Term of office	
1	Heaton Rhodes	7 October 1909	15 February 1912
2	David Guthrie	15 February 1912	10 July 1912
3	William Nosworthy	6 August 1912	27 February 1918
4	Richard Bollard	27 February 1918	10 September 1919
5	Robert Scott	27 November 1919	17 December 1919
6	James Dickson	24 June 1920	21 July 1923
7	Billy Glenn	21 July 1923	29 June 1927
8	John Bitchener	20 July 1927	18 October 1928
9	Jimmy Nash	18 October 1928	22 September 1931

==== Alliance ====
No.	Name	Term of office	
1	Grant Gillon	1996	2002

==== Mauri Pacific ====
No.	Name	Term of office	
1	Ann Batten	1998	1999

==== United Future ====
No.	Name	Term of office	
1	Gordon Copeland	2002	2007
2	Judy Turner	2007	2008
