= Frederick Nene Russell =

New Zealand politician

New Zealand Parliament
Years	Term	Electorate	Party
1868–1870	4th	Northern Maori	Independent

Frederick Nene Russell (fl. 1868–1886) was a Māori member of Parliament in New Zealand. He was one of four Māori elected in 1868 for the new Māori electorates in the New Zealand parliament.

He represented the electorate of Northern Maori from 1868 to 1870, when he retired.

Son of George Frederick Russell, a timber merchant of Kohukohu and his second wife Herina Tuku, a Ngāpuhi woman. Through her, he was related to Tāmati Wāka Nene.

He served as chief clerk in the Native Office at Wellington for several years, resigning in May 1884.

He died in Suva, Fiji in January 1886.

New Zealand Parliament
New constituency	Member of Parliament for Northern Maori; 1868–1870	Succeeded by Wi Katene
