= Tāreha Te Moananui =

Māori chief and politician (died 1880)

Ariki Tāreha Te Moananui MP
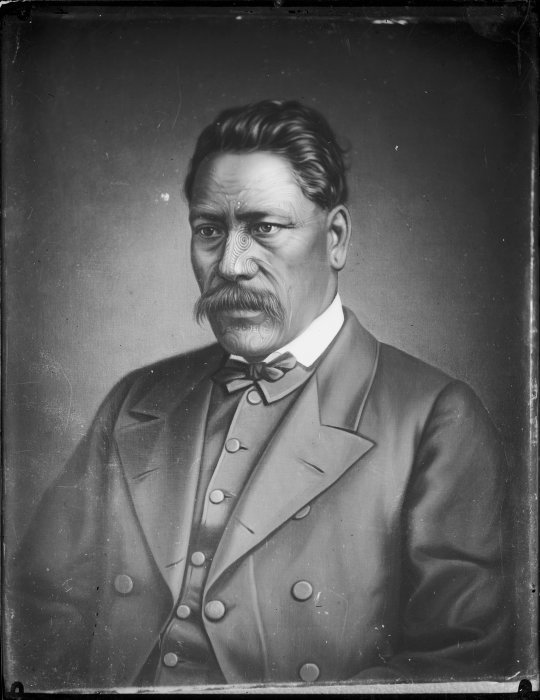

Member of the New Zealand Parliament for Eastern Maori
- In office 1868–1870
- Preceded by: New constituency
- Succeeded by: Karaitiana Takamoana

Personal details
- Born: 1800–1810 Ahuriri
- Died: 19 December 1880
- Spouse: Mere Te Huia Te Apatari
- Children: Te Roera Tāreha & Kurupō Tāreha
- Profession: Paramount Chief & Political Leader

Military service
- Allegiance: Ngāti Kahungunu
- Battles/wars: New Zealand Wars

Tāreha Te Moananui
- Paramount Chief of Heretaunga
- Predecessor: Te Moananui
- Successor: Rēnata Kawepō
- Born: Tāreha
- House: Rangikamangungu
- Father: Oneone
- Mother: Hamene

Tāreha Te Moananui (died 19 December 1880) was a Paramount Chief of the Ngāti Kahungunu iwi, and a Māori member of Parliament in New Zealand from 1868 to 1870.

Born between 1800 and 1810, Tāreha was the son of the great Chief Oneone of Ngāti Rangikamangungu and Hāmene of Ngāi Tūhoe. He received the paramountcy and name of Te Moananui following the death of Ngāti Kahungunu leader Kurupō Te Moananui in 1861.

Tāreha was known as 'Te Mokopuna a Tangaroa', this is due to his families close descent and association with Pania and the Ponaturi tribe who live in the sea. Because of this the ancestral Wharenui at Waiohiki is called Hau Te Ana Nui, which is also the name of his ancestor Tangaroa's house in the ocean.

Tāreha was one of four Māori elected in 1868 for the new Māori electorates in the New Zealand Parliament, and he was the first of the four to speak in Parliament. He represented the electorate of Eastern Maori from 1868 to 1870, when he retired.

He died on 19 December 1880, and his tangi and funeral took place at Waiohiki, near Taradale. He had two surviving children, sons Te Roera Tāreha (1850s–1941) and Kurupō Tāreha (1871–1938).

New Zealand Parliament
Years	Term	Electorate	Party
1868–1870	4th	Eastern Maori	Independent

New Zealand Parliament
New constituency	Member of Parliament for Eastern Maori; 1868–1870	Succeeded by Karaitiana Takamoana
