= John Patterson (Southern Maori politician) =

New Zealand politician (1821–1899)

- Hōne Paratene Tamanuiarangi

Member of the New Zealand Parliament for Southern Maori
- In office 1868–1870
- Preceded by: New constituency
- Succeeded by: Hōri Kerei Taiaroa

Personal details
- Born: c.1821
- Died: 30 April 1899 (aged 78) Kaiapoi, New Zealand

Hōne Paratene Tamanuiarangi (c.1821 – 30 April 1899), also known as John Patterson, was a Māori member of Parliament in New Zealand. He was one of four Māori elected in 1868 for the new Māori electorates in the New Zealand parliament

New Zealand Parliament
Years	Term	Electorate	Party
1868–1870	4th	Southern Maori	Independent

He represented the electorate of Southern Maori from 1868 to 1870 when he retired.

As a young man, Patterson was involved in whaling with Philip Ryan at Oashore Bay, south of Lake Forsyth on the southern coast of Banks Peninsula. He also participated in the West Coast gold rush of the mid-1860s. He died aged 78 years at Kaiapoi in 1899.

New Zealand Parliament
New constituency	Member of Parliament for Southern Maori; 1868–1870	Succeeded by Hōri Kerei Taiaroa
