= Vikings of the Sunrise =

1938 book by Te Rangi Hīroa (Peter Buck)

- Author: Te Rangi Hīroa (Peter Buck
- Illustrator: Peter Buck
- Language: English
- Subject: Polynesia
- Publisher: Frederick A. Stokes
- Publication date: 1938
- Publication place: United States of America
- Media type: Print
- Pages: 335

Vikings of the Sunrise is a 1938 account of the exploration and colonisation of the Pacific by Polynesians, written by the anthropologist Peter Buck, also known by his Māori name Te Rangi Hīroa, the New-Zealand-born director of the Bernice P. Bishop Museum in Honolulu, Hawaii. It was first published in 1938 in the United States by Frederick A. Stokes, and a second edition was published in New Zealand in 1954 by Whitcombe and Tombs.

Buck was a medical doctor who had an interest in the Pacific and had worked as medical officer in both the Cook Islands and Niue and participated in the 1919–1923 Dominion Museum ethnological expeditions. In 1921 he was appointed the director of the Maori Hygiene Division in the New Zealand Department of Health, was publishing his research on the Pacific in the Journal of the Polynesian Society, and in 1926 wrote the monograph The evolution of Māori clothing. In 1926 he spent 10 weeks on a research trip to the Cook Islands, publishing his findings as The material culture of the Cook Islands (Aitutaki) in 1927. This research was funded by Herbert E. Gregory, director of the Bishop Museum in Honolulu, who in 1927 offered him a five-year research fellowship as an professional ethnologist at the museum. In 1932 at the end of the fellowship he was appointed visiting professor of anthropology at Yale University, and became the director of the Bishop Museum in 1936; around this time was researching and writing Vikings of the Sunrise in his own time at home. In 1934 on an expedition to Mangareva he noted in his diary, "I have the Mangarevan culture and dialect pat…I can see my popular book being all the more improved for the waiting."

Vikings of the Sunrise (1938), called "by far the most popular of his works", was an ethnological survey of the social organisation, history, and oral traditions of the Polynesian peoples and their settlement of the Eastern Pacific, written for a non-specialist audience. Described by Buck's biographer as "a witty and light-hearted romp", it was very popular in the United States and was reprinted several times. It was the only popular book Buck published, although he always intended to write more. Its title comes from Buck contrasting the Classical tradition of coastal seafaring in the enclosed Mediterranean with the voyages of exploration of the Vikings, who travelled across the open ocean to Iceland, Greenland, and North America; Buck claims these voyages have much more in common with the first settlement of the Pacific.

The books deals with the folklore and traditions of island groups but in the context of Polynesia as a whole, a novel approach for the time. Each chapter begins with a brief quotation, usually Polynesian poetry or song, and one of Buck's own line drawings. Buck argues for a settlement of Polynesia via a northern or Micronesian route, rather than via Melanesia which was a popular hypothesis at the time; any Polynesian colonies in Melanesia Buck attributes to subsequent westward settlement. He bases this on the similarity of cultural traditions and points out it explains the lack of bow and arrow in Polynesian culture, as the sling was the more common projectile weapon in Micronesia; he does however claim the Polynesian domestic animals (pigs, chickens, and dogs) and crops arrived via the high islands of Melanesia. Reflecting the anthropology of the time, Buck classifies all humans as Negroids, Mongoloids, or the catch-all category of Europoids (to which he claims Polynesians belong). This classification aligned with the views of Edward Tregear and Percy Smith.

Unlike some authors at the time who derided the culture of Rapa Nui (Easter Island) as the most primitive in Polynesia, Buck rates it highly. Buck's insistence on an eastward settlement of the Pacific from Indonesia contrasts with Thor Heyerdahl's 1952 contention that Polynesia was explored and heavily influenced (if not settled) westwards from South America. Buck explains the presence of sweet potato cultivation in Polynesia as the result of an unknown voyager travelling to Peru from the Marquesas in pre-Columbian times. As a contemporary reviewer put it, "The 'Mystery of Easter Island' is a ghost that is clearly, effective, and one hopes, finally laid."

A central contention of the book is that the high volcanic islands of central Polynesia, which would have been rich in new resources to voyagers who had previously inhabited low coral atolls, sparked social and cultural transformation. One criticism Edward Winslow Gifford levelled at the book in his review of the first edition is Buck's contention that Polynesian food plants arrived via the Melanesian islands, because all the cultivated crops like taro, bananas and breadfruit supposedly require volcanic soil to thrive; Gifford points out these crops also grow well in the coralline soils of Tonga. Nevertheless Gifford praised the book highly and stated "no student of the Pacific can afford to be without it".

In 2025 Vikings of the Sunrise was recognised in Books of Mana as one of the 180 most significant works of Māori-authored non-fiction. It was published in a new edition in 2023 by Oratia Books with a forward by anthropologist Paora Tapsell, who described the book as the "crowning achievement of physical anthropology" and "essential reading".
