= Johannes Carl Andersen =

New Zealand librarian and ethnologist (1873–1962)

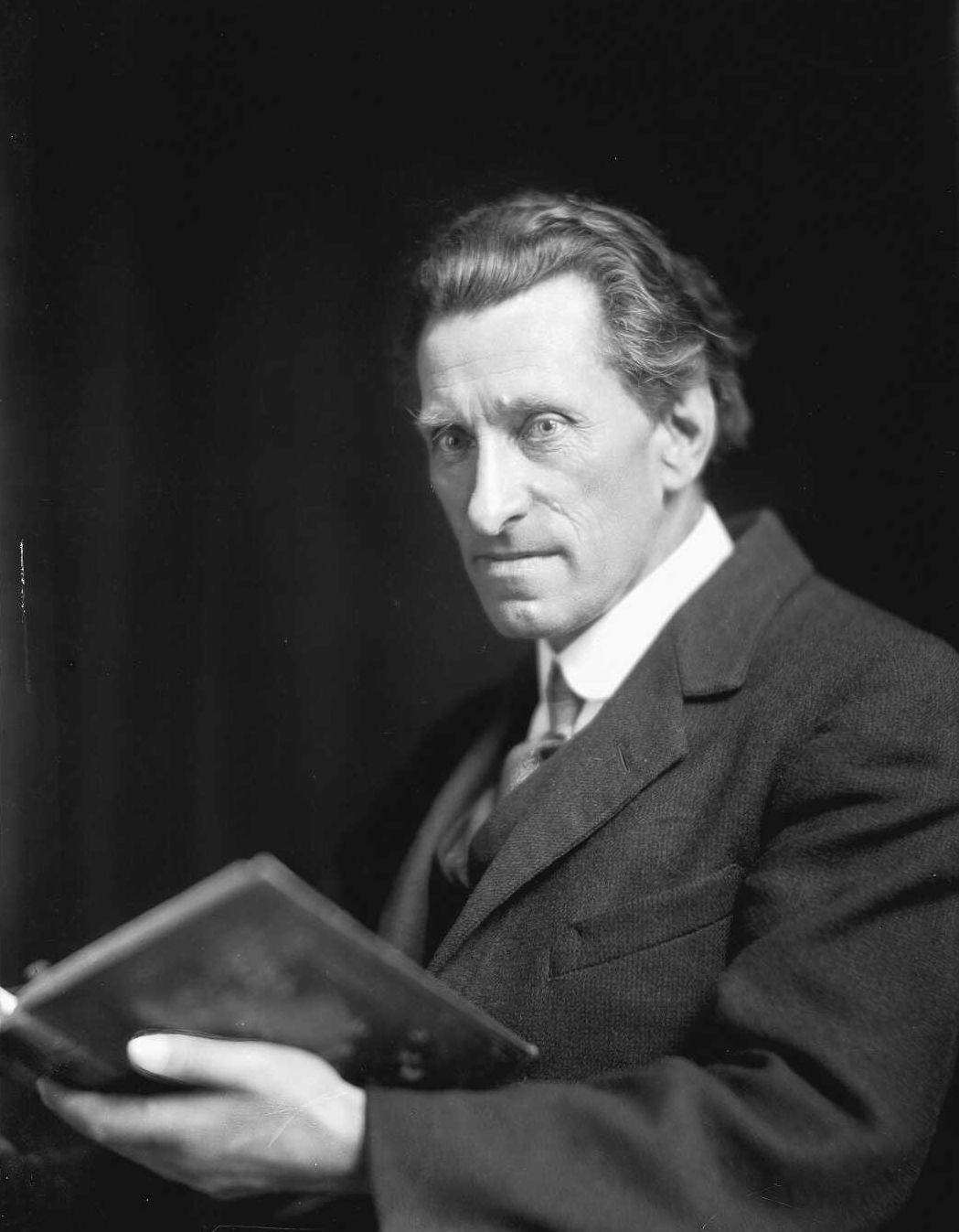
- Carl Anderson in c. 1928
- Born: 14 March 1873; Klakring (now Hedensted), Denmark
- Died: 19 June 1962 (aged 89)
- Occupations: Clerk, poet, ethnologist, librarian, editor, historian
- Spouse: Kate McHaffie (m. 1900)
- Awards: MBE

Johannes Carl Andersen MBE (14 March 1873 – 19 June 1962) was a New Zealand clerk, poet, ethnologist, librarian, editor and historian.

Andersen was born in Klakring (now Hedensted), Denmark, on 14 March 1873. His family emigrated to New Zealand in October 1874 and settled in Christchurch. In 1887 he began working at the Department of Lands and Survey as a cadet draughtsman and then as a clerk. In May 1900 Andersen married teacher Kate McHaffie, who later became active in various community organisations in Wellington, including the New Zealand Women Writers' and Artists' Society. Andersen supported her endeavours, including by reviewing and endorsing the literary efforts of Society members.

Andersen took a special interest in traditional Māori culture and mythology. This saw him attempt to record and retell aspects of their culture. To the public, he was best known as the inaugural librarian of the Alexander Turnbull Library from 1919 to 1937.

Andersen participated in the 1919–1923 Dominion Museum ethnological expeditions alongside Te Rangihīroa, Elsdon Best, James McDonald and Āpirana Ngata.

In the 1935 King's Birthday Honours, he was appointed a Member of the Order of the British Empire.
