= 1887 Northern Maori by-election =

New Zealand by-election

The 1887 Northern Maori by-election was a by-election during the 9th New Zealand Parliament. The election was held on 9 May 1887.

The seat of Northern Maori became vacant following the death of the sitting member Ihaka Hakuene on 6 April.

The by-election was won by Wi Katene (described as a Stout-Vogel government supporter) by a margin of three votes, contrary to expectations. However, none of the newspaper reports give the number of votes recorded for each candidate.

Although Sydney Taiwhanga petitioned the Supreme Court about irregularities in the poll; the petition was later withdrawn.
