= Peter Buck (anthropologist) =

New Zealand physician and anthropologist (1877–1951)

Sir Peter Buck KCMG DSO
- Te Rangi Hīroa
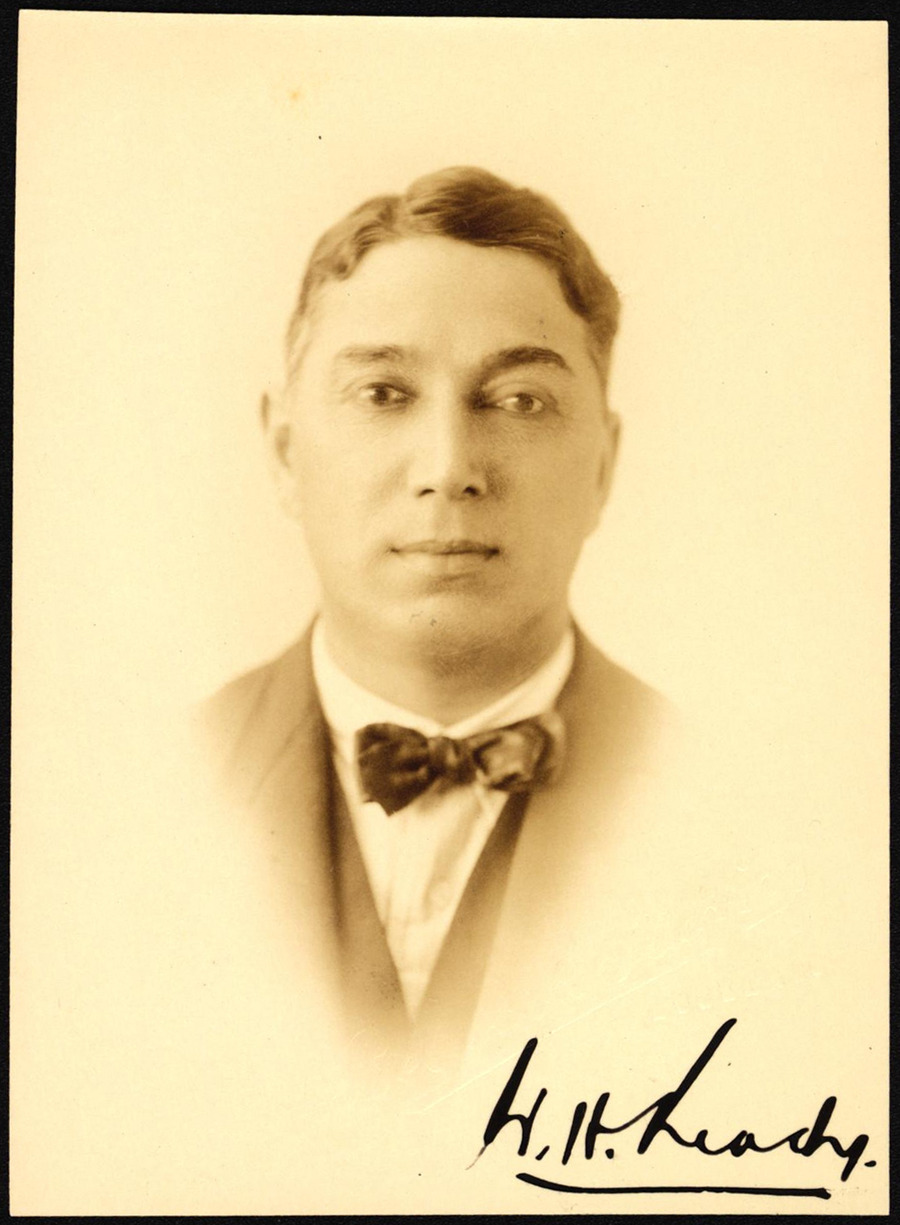
- Te Rangi Hīroa in 1927
- Born: Peter Henry Buck c. October 1877; Urenui, Taranaki, New Zealand
- Died: 1 December 1951 (aged 74); Honolulu, Hawaii, USA
- Occupations: Anthropologist, politician, doctor

Sir Peter Henry Buck KCMG DSO (c. October 1877 – 1 December 1951), also known as Te Rangi Hīroa or Te Rangihīroa, was a New Zealand anthropologist and an expert on Māori and Polynesian cultures who served many roles through his life: as a physician and surgeon; as an official in public health; as a member of parliament; and ultimately as a leading anthropologist and director of the Bishop Museum in Hawaii.

In his younger years, Buck was highly accomplished as an athlete. At Te Aute College he captained the high school's athletics and rugby teams and while at University of Otago's medical school he was national long jump champion in 1900 and 1903.

Buck served as a medical officer to Māori in the years following his medical training in 1905, before completing a doctor of medicine with a thesis on contemporary and traditional Māori medicine in 1910. In 1909 he was thrust into politics, serving as MP for the Northern Maori electorate until 1914. On recesses from parliament, Buck travelled to the Cook Islands and to Niue as a medical officer, where he developed his interests in anthropology.

In 1921, following service in World War I, Buck was made director of the Māori Hygiene Division of the Department of Health. He continued to make a name for himself as an accomplished anthropologist of Pacific peoples—including as the leading authority on Māori material culture—and eventually served as director of the Bishop Museum in Hawaii, from 1936 until his death in 1951.

== Early life ==
Peter Henry Buck was born in Urenui, in northern Taranaki, the only child of an Anglo-Irish immigrant, William Henry Buck. William's wife Ngārongo-ki-tua, whom he met at Urenui, had been unable to have children and, in line with Māori custom, Rina, one of Ngārongo's close relatives, became part of the household and produced a child for the couple. Rina died soon after Peter was born, and Ngārongo raised him as her own. He claimed to have been born in 1880, but the register of the primary school he attended records October 1877, which is likely to be correct.

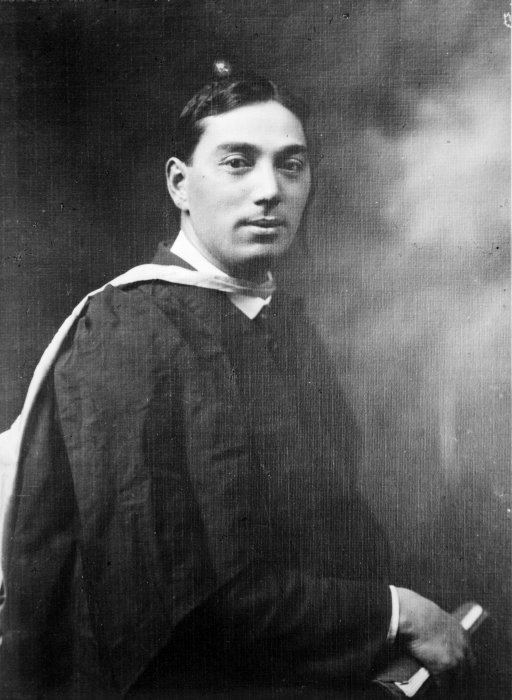
Te Rangi Hīroa in 1904

Buck's paternal ancestry was Anglo-Irish. Though he was largely brought up within the Pākehā community at Urenui, Ngārongo-ki-tua and his great-aunt Kapuakore instilled a love of Māori tradition and language in him. Buck was descended on his maternal side from the Taranaki tribe of Ngāti Mutunga.

After Ngārongo's death in 1892 he moved with his father to the Wairarapa. In 1896, he enrolled at Te Aute College, a school that produced many Māori leaders of the time. In 1899, he was named dux and passed a medical preliminary examination entitling him to attend medical school at University of Otago.

Buck was later associated with the Young Māori Party.

== Name ==
In his teens, his elders gave him the name Te Rangi Hīroa (also written Te Rangihiroa) in honour of an uncle of Ngārongo's, an earlier notable ancestor. He would later use it as a pen-name.

When Te Rangihīroa College at the University of Otago was being rebuilt in 2020, the two-word version Te Rangihīroa of Buck's name was adopted at the request of his iwi descendants, Ngāti Mutunga, on the basis that it was Buck's preferred style.

== Medical school and practice ==
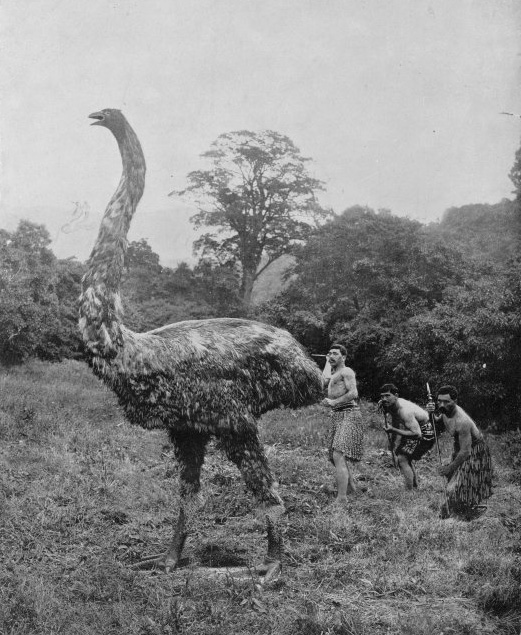
Medical students Peter Buck (left), Hēmi Papakura (middle) and Tūtere Wī Repa (right) posed as if hunting a reconstructed moa from Otago Museum in the Dunedin Public Gardens, circa 1906

Buck did well at Otago Medical School, where he also succeeded in sport, becoming national long jump champion in 1900 and 1903. He completed his MB ChB in 1904, and an MD six years later. His doctoral thesis, completed in 1910, was titled Medicine amongst the Maoris in ancient and modern times. During this time, in 1905, he married Irish-born Margaret Wilson. Their long marriage was often fiery, but was strong, and it was Margaret who often gave the impetus to Buck's career.

In November 1905, Buck was appointed as a medical officer to Māori, working under Māui Pōmare, initially in the southern North Island, then in the far north. Between them, Pōmare and Buck campaigned successfully to improve sanitation in the small Māori communities around the country.

=== Parliament and war ===
New Zealand Parliament
Years	Term	Electorate	Party
1909–1911	17th	Northern Maori	Liberal
1911–1914	18th	Northern Maori	Liberal

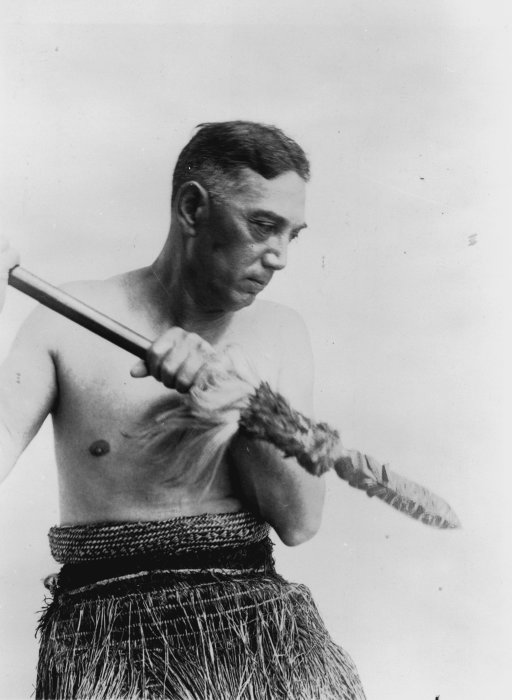
Te Rangi Hīroa holding a taiaha, circa 1930

In 1909, Hōne Heke Ngāpua, Member of Parliament for Northern Maori died suddenly. Buck was singled out by Native Minister James Carroll to be his replacement. Buck accepted and was elected in the subsequent by-election. He became a member of the Native Affairs Committee. In only his second speech in Parliament he participated in a filibuster on a bill to adopt daylight saving in New Zealand. Buck told the story of Māui capturing the sun to slow its progress across the sky, and quipped that Māui had been the first to implement Daylight Saving in the Pacific; the humorous reaction to this story in a dry debate, he later noted, seemed to have been the only thing his colleagues recalled of his six years in Parliament.

He did not seek re-election to the seat in 1914, but stood for the Bay of Islands electorate, where he lost by a narrow margin. By this time, Buck had developed an interest in Pacific Island peoples, working briefly as a medical officer in both the Cook Islands and Niue during parliamentary breaks.

During the First World War, Buck helped in the recruitment of a Māori volunteer contingent. Buck joined this contingent as medical officer, travelling to the Middle East in 1915. He took part at Gallipoli, later being awarded a Distinguished Service Order for his heroism. He later saw action in France and Belgium, before being posted to the No 3 New Zealand General Hospital at Codford, England, in 1918.

Returning to New Zealand, Buck was appointed as Chief Maori Medical Officer, and in 1921 was named director of the Maori Hygiene Division in the Department of Health.

Buck participated in the 1919–1923 Dominion Museum ethnological expeditions alongside Elsdon Best, James McDonald, Johannes Carl Andersen and Āpirana Ngata.

== Bishop Museum ==
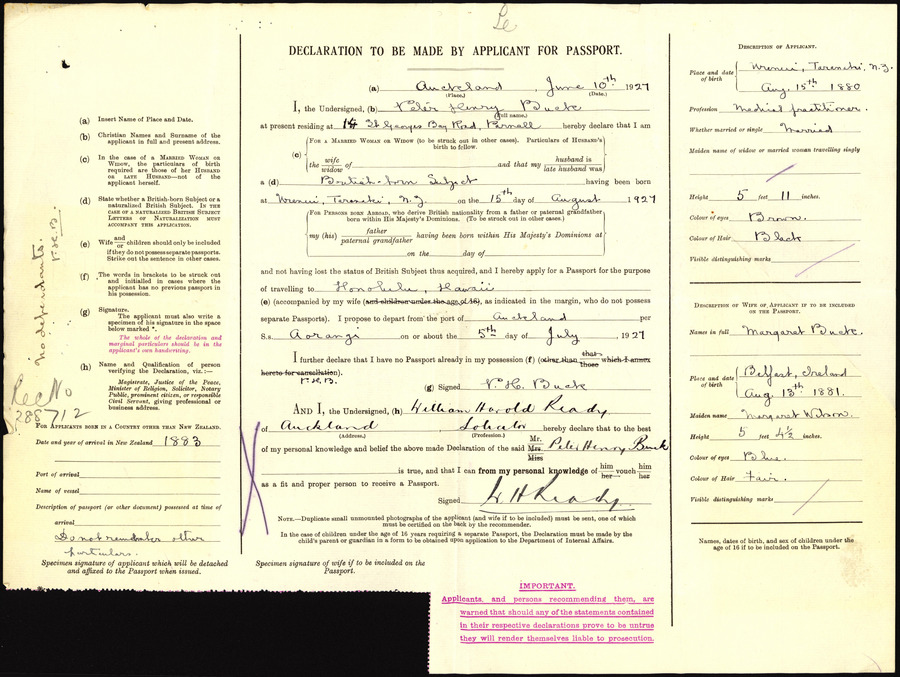
Peter and Margaret Buck passport application (1927)

Buck became so interested in an anthropological survey of Polynesia being conducted by the Bishop Museum in Honolulu, Hawaii that he resigned from his job as director of the Māori Hygiene Division in New Zealand and joined the Bishop Museum in 1927 on a five-year research fellowship as an ethnologist. In 1932 at the end of the fellowship he was appointed the Bishop Museum visiting professor of anthropology at Yale University. He was promoted to Director of the museum in 1936, the first Indigenous person to have that position and one he held until his death in 1951. He also served as a trustee and president of the museum's board of trustees.

While at the Bishop Museum, as well as publishing numerous anthropological works, Buck wrote Vikings of the Sunrise (1938), the first Māori-authored account of the migration and settlement through the Pacific by Polynesians, whom Buck compared to the Vikings for their navigational skill. He also wrote The Coming of the Maori (1949), a survey of all aspects of traditional Māori culture and history from a scientific perspective.

During his directorship, Buck applied for U.S. Citizenship, which was denied. According to Buck, he “could not become an American citizen under the ... law for an applicant has to be over 50% Caucasian. The Polynesians are classed as Orientals in spite of anthropological evidence of their Caucasian origin so I could only show 50%.”

== Death ==
Buck died in Honolulu, on 1 December 1951 after some years with cancer. His ashes were returned to New Zealand in 1953 and he was honoured with a ceremony at Ōkoki, near his hometown of Urenui, on 8 August 1954.

== Awards and tributes ==
- In 1925, ethnologist Harry Skinner recommended that the inaugural Percy Smith Medal be awarded to Buck, but the University of Otago decided to award the medal to Skinner himself that year. Buck was awarded the following medal, in 1929.
- In 1935, he was awarded the King George V Silver Jubilee Medal.
- In the 1946 King's Birthday Honours, Buck was appointed a Knight Commander of the Order of St Michael and St George for services to science and literature.
- The Te Rangi Hiroa Medal is a social sciences award established in 1996 given biennially by the Royal Society of New Zealand. It is awarded for work in one of four disciplines: historical approaches to societal transformation and change; current issues in cultural diversity and cohesion; social and economic policy and development; and medical anthropology.
- One of the residential colleges of the University of Otago was named Te Rangi Hīroa College in 2013 in his honour.
- Buck's books Vikings of the Sunrise and The Coming of the Maori were included in Books of Mana (2025) as two of the 180 most significant works of Māori-authored non-fiction.

== Bibliography ==
- Buck, Peter (1910), Medicine amongst the Maoris in ancient and modern times: a thesis for the degree of Doctor of Medicine (N.Z.)
- Buck, Peter (1911), Takiwa pooti o te Tai-Tokerau, Wellington, N.Z.: N.Z. Times Print
- Buck, Peter (1923), Maori plaited basketry and plaitwork. 1, Mats, baskets, and burden-carriers, Wellington, N.Z.: Government Printer
- Buck, Peter (1924), Maori plaited basketry and plaitwork. 2, Belts and bands, fire-fans and fly-flaps, sandals and sails, Wellington, N.Z.: Government Printer
- Buck, Peter (1925), The coming of the Maori, Nelson, N.Z.: R. W. Stiles
- Buck, Peter (1926), The evolution of Maori clothing (Memoirs of the Polynesian Society; v. 7), New Plymouth, N.Z.: Printed by Thomas Avery, under the authority of the Board of Maori Ethnological Research
- Buck, Peter (1926), The Maori craft of netting, Wellington, N.Z.: Government Printer
- Buck, Peter (1927), The material culture of the Cook Islands (Aitutaki) [Memoirs of the Board of Maori Ethnological Research; v. 1], New Plymouth, N.Z.: Printed by Thomas Avery, under the authority of the Board of Maori Ethnological Research
- Buck, Peter (1929), The coming of the Maori (2nd ed.), Nelson, N.Z.; New Plymouth N.Z.: Cawthron Institute; Thomas Avery & Sons
- Buck, Peter (1930), Samoan material culture (Bernice P. Bishop Museum bulletin; 75), Honolulu, HI.: Bernice P. Bishop Museum
- Buck, Peter (1932), Ethnology of Manihiki and Rakahanga (Bernice P. Bishop Museum bulletin; 99), Honolulu, HI.: Bernice P. Bishop Museum
- Buck, Peter (1932), Ethnology of Tongareva (Bernice P. Bishop Museum bulletin; 92), Honolulu, HI.: Bernice P. Bishop Museum
- Buck, Peter (1938), Ethnology of Mangareva (Bernice P. Bishop Museum bulletin; 157), Honolulu, HI.: Bernice P. Bishop Museum
- Buck, Peter (1938), Vikings of the Sunrise (1st ed.), Philadelphia: Frederick A. Stokes
- Buck, Peter (1934), Mangaian society (Bernice P. Bishop Museum bulletin; 122), Honolulu, HI.: Bernice P. Bishop Museum
- Buck, Peter (1936), Regional diversity in the elaboration of sorcery in Polynesia (Yale University publications in anthropology; no. 2), New Haven, CT.: Published for the Section of Anthropology, Dept. of the Social Sciences, Yale University by the Yale University Press
- Buck, Peter (1939), Anthropology and religion, New Haven, CT.: Yale University Press
- Buck, Peter (1940), "Native races need not die", Asia, 40 (7): 379–382
- Buck, Peter (1944), Arts and crafts of the Cook Islands (Bernice P. Bishop Museum bulletin; 179), Honolulu, HI.: Bernice P. Bishop Museum
- Buck, Peter (1945), An introduction to Polynesian anthropology (Bernice P. Bishop Museum bulletin; 187.), Honolulu, HI.: Bernice P. Bishop Museum
- The voice of Sir Apirana T. Ngata; The voices of Sir Peter (Te Rangihiroa) Buck, Bishop Frederick Augustus Bennett (Bishop of Aotearoa), Te Puea Herangi [sound recording] (HMV PR-9) 10-inch / 78rpm, Wellington, N.Z.: His Master's Voice, 1949
- Buck, Peter (1950), Material culture of Kapingamarangi (Bernice P. Bishop Museum bulletin; 200), Honolulu, HI.: Bernice P. Bishop Museum
- Buck, Peter (1950), The coming of the Maori (2nd ed.), Wellington, N.Z.: Māori Purposes Fund Board; Whitcombe & Tombs
- Buck, Peter (1952), Les migrations des Polynesians: les Vikings du soleil levant (The Vikings of the sunrise) [Bibliotheque scientifique], Paris, France: Payot
- Buck, Peter (1953), Explorers of the Pacific: European and American discoveries in Polynesia (Bernice P. Bishop Museum Special Publication; 43), Honolulu, HI.: Bernice P. Bishop Museum?
- Buck, Peter (1954), Vikings of the Sunrise (New Zealand ed.), Christchurch, N.Z.: Whitcombe & Tombs
- Buck, Peter (1957), Arts and crafts of Hawaii (Bernice P. Bishop Museum Special Publication; 45), Honolulu, HI.: Bernice P. Bishop Museum Press
- Buck, Peter (1970), Anthropology and religion, Hamden, CT.: Archon Books
- Buck, Peter (1976), The material culture of the Cook Islands (Aitutaki), New York, NY.: AMS Press
- Buck, Peter (1993), Mangaia and the mission, Suva, Fiji: IPS, USP in association with Bernice P. Bishop Museum, ISBN 982-315-001-X
- Sorrenson, Keith (1986–1988), Na to hoa aroha = From your dear friend: the correspondence between Sir Āpirana Ngata and Te Rangi Hīroa, 1925–50 (3 vol.), Auckland, N.Z.: Auckland University Press in association with the Alexander Turnbull Library Endowment Trust and the Māori Purposes Fund Board

== Footnotes ==
New Zealand Parliament
Preceded by Hōne Heke Ngāpua	Member of Parliament for Northern Maori; 1909–1914	Succeeded by Taurekareka Hēnare
