= 1901 Northern Maori by-election =

New Zealand by-election

The 1901 Northern Maori by-election was a by-election for the seat of Northern Maori during the 14th New Zealand Parliament. The election was held on 9 January 1901.

The sitting member Hone Heke Ngapua was declared bankrupt and had to resign from the seat.

However following the precedent of Sir Joseph Ward in 1897 (see 1897 Awarua by-election) he was eligible to stand in the resulting by-election.

He won the by-election with a substantial majority.

Eparaima Te Mutu Kapa had won the seat in the 1891 by-election, but had been defeated in the 1896 election and 1899 election.

== Results ==
The following table gives the election results:

1901 Northern Maori by-election
Party	Candidate	Votes	%	±%
Liberal	Hone Heke Ngapua	1,751	71.41	
Independent	Riapo Puhipi	416	16.97	
Independent	Eparaima Te Mutu Kapa	285	11.62	
Independent	Hapeta Henare	97	3.96	
Independent	Kiri Pararea	94	3.83	
Independent	Pouaka Parore	76	3.10	
Turnout		2452		
Majority		1335	54.45	
