= Brownie Pūriri =

New Zealand land title officer and Maori welfare worker

Nau Pāraone Kawiti Pūriri (7 March 1924 – 1 September 1979) was a New Zealand land title officer and Māori welfare worker. Of Māori descent, he identified with the Ngāpuhi, Ngāti Hine and Ngāti Kahu o Torongare iwi. He was born in Ngararatunua, Northland, New Zealand in 1924.

At the 1962 local elections he stood for the Porirua Borough Council but was unsuccessful. He was a candidate to stand as the Labour Party nominee at the 1963 Northern Maori by-election after the death of Tāpihana Paraire Paikea.
