= 1891 Northern Maori by-election =

New Zealand by-election

The 1891 Northern Maori by-election was a by-election during the 11th New Zealand Parliament. The election was held on 7 February 1891.

The seat of Northern Maori became vacant following the death of the sitting member Sydney Taiwhanga on 27 November 1890.

Taiwhango had been re-elected in 1890 for Northern Maori, but died on election day. He also stood in Eastern Maori, and came second.

The by-election was won by Eparaima Te Mutu Kapa.

Wi Katene had represented the electorate from 1871 to 1875 and in 1887 after the 1887 by-election.

== Results ==
The following table gives the election results:

1891 Northern Maori by-election
Party	Candidate	Votes	%	±%
Independent	Eparaima Te Mutu Kapa	632	43.68	
Independent	Timoti Puhipuhi	515	35.59	
Independent	Wiremu Katene	300	20.73	
Independent	Haki Rewite	194	13.41	
Independent	Renata Tekawatuku	7	0.48	
Independent	Kipa Te Whatanui	1	0.07	
Turnout		1447		
Majority		117	8.09	
