= James McDonald (artist) =

New Zealand artist

- Born: James Ingram McDonald; 11 June 1865; Tokomairiro, New Zealand
- Died: 13 April 1935 (aged 69); Tokaanu, New Zealand
- Relatives: Anne Salmond (great-granddaughter)

James Ingram McDonald (11 June 1865 – 13 April 1935) was a New Zealand painter, photographer, film-maker, museum director, cultural ambassador film censor, and promoter of Maori arts and crafts.

== Career ==
James McDonald was born in Tokomairiro, South Otago, New Zealand on 11 June 1865. He began painting early in his life and took art lessons as a young man in Dunedin with James Nairn, Nugent Welch and Girolamo Nerli. He continued his art studies in Melbourne, Australia, but returned to New Zealand in 1901, where he worked as a photographer. From 1905 he was a museum assistant and draughtsman in the Colonial Museum, later to become the Dominion Museum and even later the Museum of New Zealand Te Papa Tongarewa). He began making films about various scenic sights. At the museum he was responsible for the maintenance of the photographic collection and the production of paintings, drawings and photographs for the Dominion Museum bulletins.

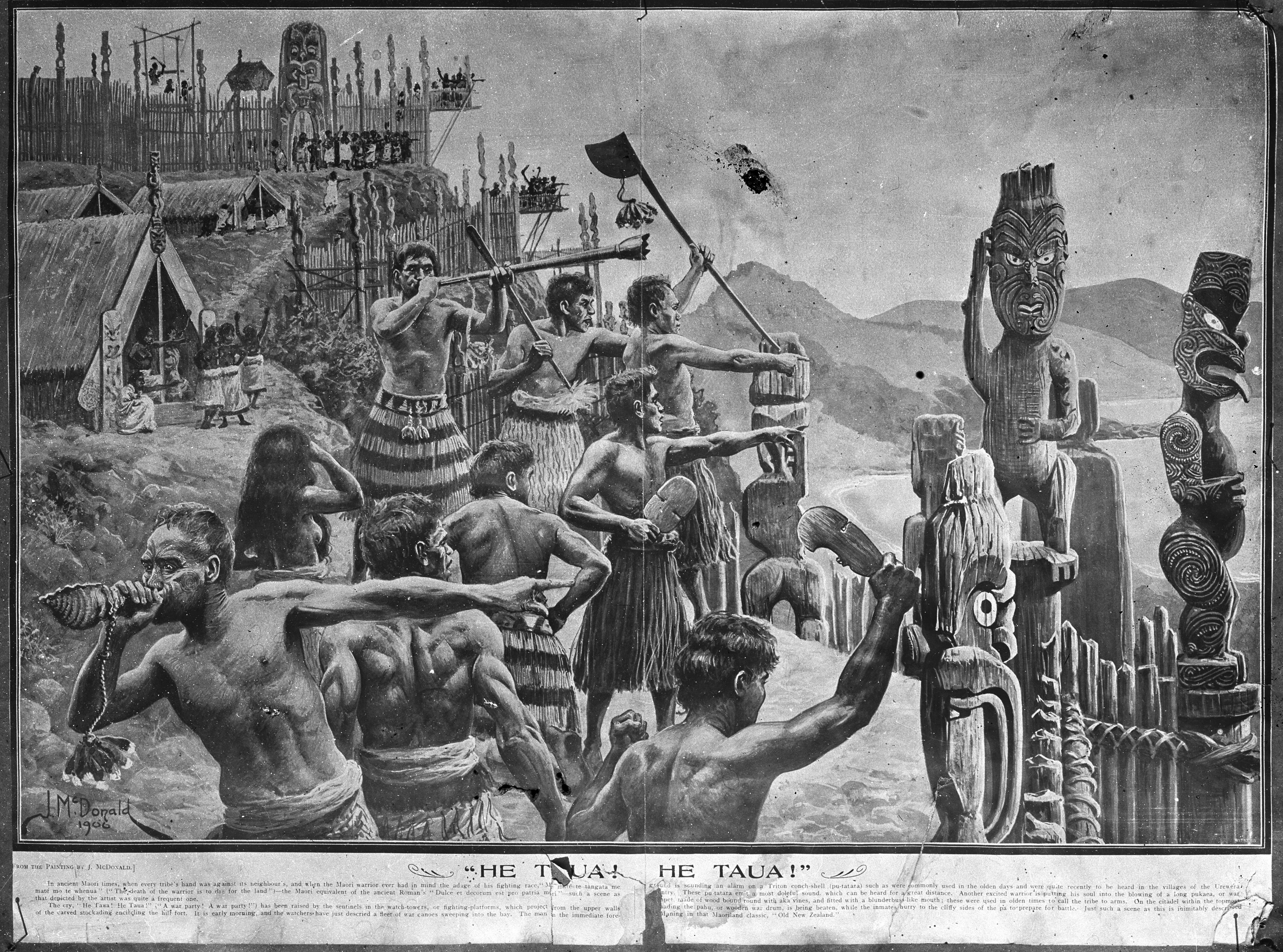
Reproduction of He taua! He taua, painted in 1906

He began to gather information about Māori tribal traditions. His films show poi dances and whai string games. He was probably the earliest known ethnographic filmmaker in New Zealand. In 1920 he filmed the gathering of the Māori tribes in Rotorua, when they welcomed the Prince of Wales, and other aspects of the royal journey. He filmed traditional skills and activities, including the make of fishing nets and traps, weaving, digging kumara camps and cooking food in a hangi. Most of his often unedited and fragmentary negatives became only known in 1986 after restoration by the New Zealand film archive.

In 1914, due to the poor health of his predecessor, J. A. Thomson, he was appointed as Interim Director of the Dominion Museum. One of his tasks was the design of the New Zealand coat of arms, for which the royal commission was awarded on 26 April 1911. He was appointed as Assistant Censor of Cinema Films in August 1918 and held this position for eight years.

McDonald participated in the 1919–1923 Dominion Museum ethnological expeditions alongside Te Rangihīroa, Elsdon Best, Johannes Andersen and Āpirana Ngata.

In 1926 James McDonald was appointed to the board of Māori Arts, and in the same year he resigned from his posts in the museum. He moved to Tokaanu, where he helped building the Te Tuwharetoa School of Māori Arts and Crafts. Its aims were the revival of traditional art, which was in danger of being lost, and the encouragement of the Māori of Ngati Tuwharetoa to produce handicrafts for sale at home and abroad. The school received no state subsidies, so McDonald and his family suffered from considerable financial difficulties. McDonald earned mutual trust and deep respect from local Māori.

He died in Tokaanu on 13 April 1935 and was buried at Taupo cemetery. The School of Applied Arts, which he had founded, doesn't exist anymore, but many examples of McDonald's work have been preserved. Many hundreds of his photographic negatives are kept by the Museum of New Zealand Te Papa Tongarewa. There are prints of his works in the collections of the Alexander Turnbull Library and the Bernice P. Bishop Museum in Hawaii. The four ethnographic films he has made are preserved in the collection of the New Zealand Film Archive Nga Kaitiaki or Nga Taonga Whitiahua.

== Family ==
On 29 April 1891 he married Mary (May) Brabin and had three daughters with her, Marjorie, Flora and Dorothy, as well as a son, Donald Douglas. On the marriage certificate they stated his activity as an accountant, which suggests that he was not able to earn a living as an artist.
