= 1909 Northern Maori by-election =

New Zealand by-election

The 1909 Northern Maori by-election was a by-election during the 17th New Zealand Parliament. The election was held on 20 March 1909.

The seat of Northern Maori became vacant following the death of the sitting member Hone Heke Ngapua on 9 February.

The by-election was won by Te Rangi Hiroa.

Both Hone Heke Ngapua and Te Rangi Hiroa were Liberal Party MPs, and part of the Liberal Government.

== Results ==
The following table gives the election results:

1909 Northern Maori by-election
Party	Candidate	Votes	%	±%
Liberal	Te Rangi Hiroa	1,452	71.60	
Independent	Kaka Porowini	296	14.60	
Independent	Herepita Rapihana	280	13.81	
Independent	Hone Hapa	199	9.81	
Independent	Hone Wi Kaitaia	173	8.53	
Independent	Hetaraka Himi Hare	93	4.59	
Independent	Te Riri Maihi Kawiti	74	3.65	
Independent	Papa Uroroa	52	2.56	
Independent	Reihana Netana	25	1.23	
Turnout		2028		
Majority		1156	57.00	
