= Rawiri Taiwhanga =

Nga Puhi leader and missionary (1818–1874)

Rawiri Taiwhanga (fl. 1818–1874) was a notable New Zealand Māori tribal leader, farmer, Anglican missionary and teacher. He was of Ngāti Tautahi, a subtribe (hapū) of Ngāpuhi. He was the father of Sydney Taiwhanga, a 19th-century Māori member of the House of Representatives.

Before his baptism, he was known as Karaitiana Taiwhanga. On 7 February 1830 he was baptised, and took the name Rawiri Taiwhanga. He was the first high-ranking Māori to be converted to Christianity. This gave the missionary work of the Church Missionary Society led by the Rev. Henry Williams a great impetus, as it influenced many others to do the same.
