= Paraire Karaka Paikea =

New Zealand Māori politician

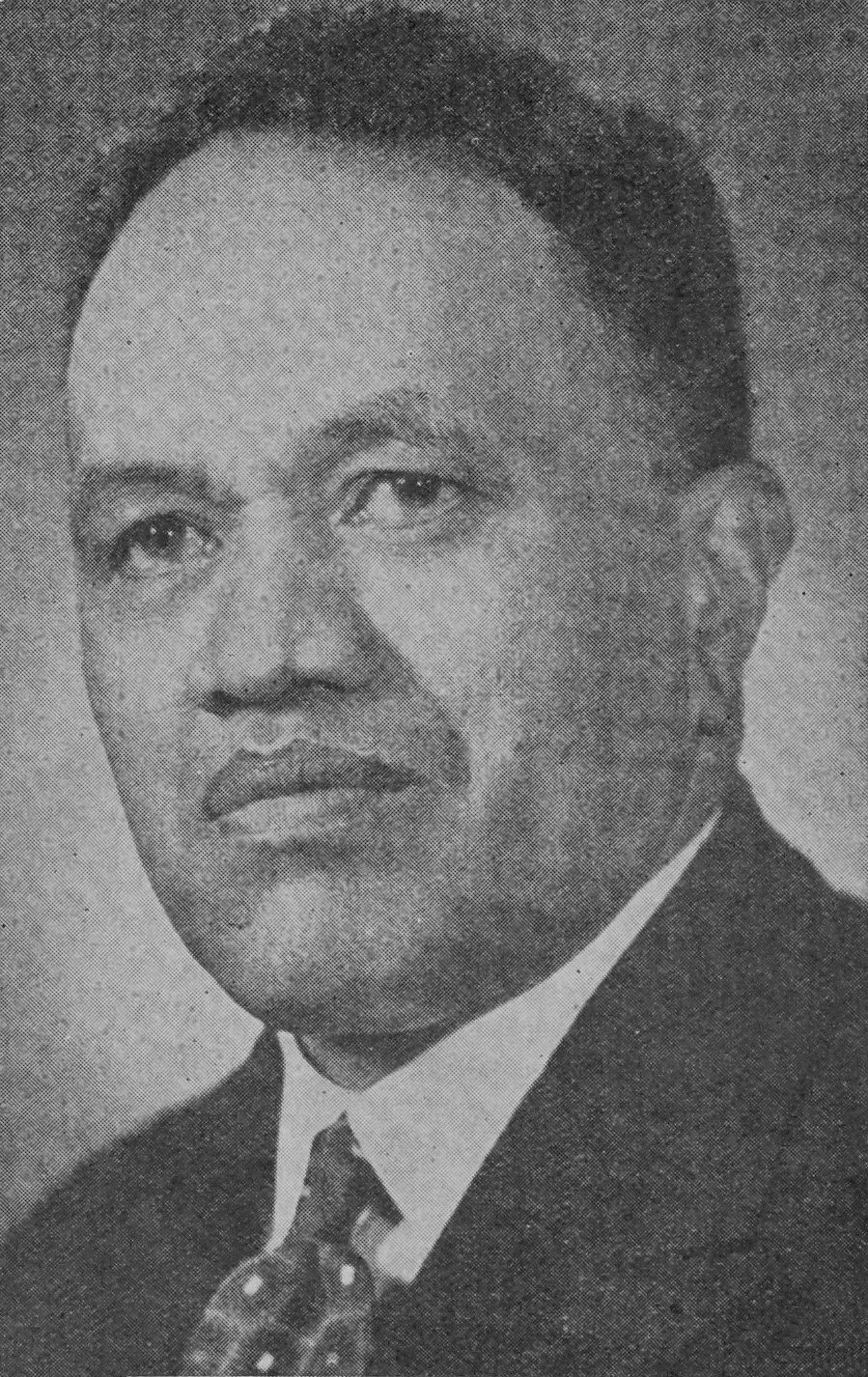

Member of the New Zealand Parliament for Northern Maori
- In office 1938 – 6 April 1943
- Preceded by: Taurekareka Henare
- Succeeded by: Tapihana Paraire Paikea

Personal details
- Born: 1 June 1894; Otamatea, Kaipara, New Zealand
- Died: 6 April 1943 (aged 48); Wanganui, New Zealand
- Children: Tapihana Paraire Paikea

Paraire Karaka Paikea (1 June 1894 – 6 April 1943) was a New Zealand Māori politician.

== Early life ==
Of Te Uri-o-Hau and Ngāti Whātua descent, Paraire Karaka Paikea was born in Otamatea, in the Kaipara area of Northland. An ordained Methodist Minister by 1921, he joined the Rātana movement and by 1924 was on the Rātana council. In June 1925 he was one of the original gazetted Rātana ministers.

== Political career ==
New Zealand Parliament
Years	Term	Electorate	Party
1938–1943	26th	Northern Maori	Labour

Paikea captured the Rātana Movement's third Māori electorate of Northern Maori from Taurekareka Henare in 1938. He was Minister without portfolio representing the Māori race from 1941 to 1943 and was also Māori Recruiting Director on the War Administration Board. Known as "Piri Wiri Tua", after Tahupōtiki Wiremu Rātana, his early death on 6 April 1943 ended a promising career.

He was succeeded as MP by his son Tapihana Paraire Paikea at the 1943 election. The need for a proposed by-election to be held on 19 June 1943 was avoided by a special Act of Parliament passed on 11 June 1943 (the By-elections Postponement Act 1943) postponing the vote until the (delayed) general election was held.

New Zealand Parliament
Preceded by Taurekareka Henare	Member of Parliament for Northern Maori; 1938–1943	Succeeded by Tapihana Paraire Paikea
