= 1963 Northern Maori by-election =

New Zealand by-election

- 16 March 1963
- Turnout: 7,350 (58.10%)
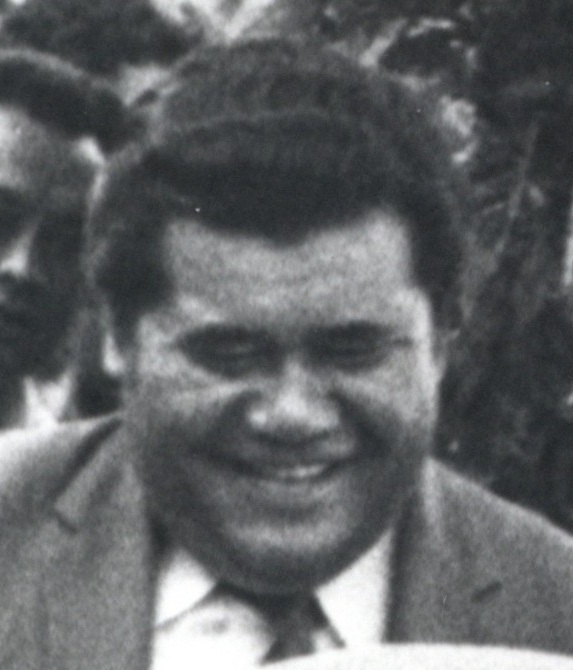

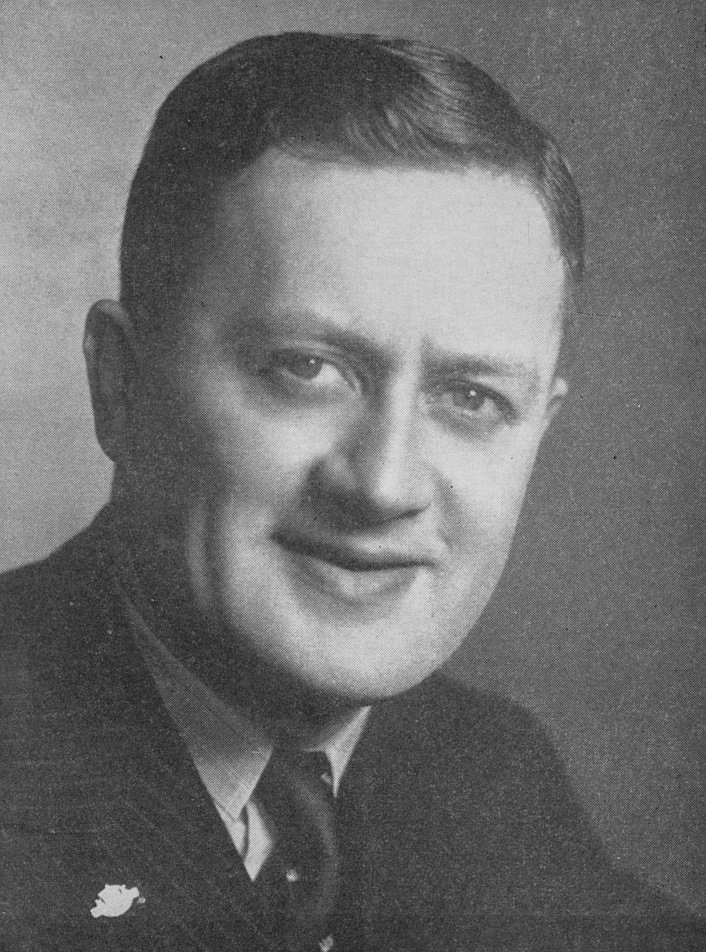
Candidate	Matiu Rata	James Hēnare
Party	Labour	National
Popular vote	3,090	2,643
Percentage	42.04	35.96
MP before election
Tāpihana Paikea
Labour
Elected MP
Matiu Rata
Labour

The Northern Maori by-election of 1963 was a by-election for the electorate of Northern Maori on 16 March 1963 during the 33rd New Zealand Parliament. The by-election resulted from the death of the previous member Tāpihana Paikea on 7 January 1963. It was held the same day as the Otahuhu by-election.

The by-election was won by Matiu Rata, also of the Labour Party. The by-election was contested by nine candidates, including James Hēnare who had stood for the National Party several times previously.

== Background and candidates ==
Labour
There were multiple nominations for the Labour Party candidacy:

- Grace Pitua Bidois, president of the Waitemata District Council of the Māori Women's Welfare League
- Te Kaiaraiha Hui, of Whangārei
- Dr. Manahi Nitama Paewai, a member of the Kaikohe Borough Council
- Eru Moka Pou, a Ngāpuhi chief and National candidate in 1943
- Brownie Pūriri, assistant controller of the Māori Welfare Department
- Matiu Rata, union organiser and president of the Auckland Ratana Church Committee
- Andrew Milton Rollo, member of the Mangonui County Council
- Mira Szaszy, an Auckland broadcaster and Māori Women's Welfare League executive member
- Joe Toia, of Ruawai
- Rev. Paikea Henare Toka, a Māori Welfare Officer – uncle of Tāpihana Paraire Paikea
- Albert Victor Waetford, of Hamilton
- George Webber, of Moerewa who was the Labour candidate for Rodney at the 1957 election and Hobson at the 1960 election

Rata was selected at a members hui. Pou and Toka both decided to stand as an independent Labour candidates after missing out on the official Labour candidacy.

National
There were two candidates for the National Party nomination:

- George Russell Harrison, National's Northern Maori candidate at the 1960 election
- James Hēnare, National's Northern Maori candidate at the 1946, 1949 and 1951 elections

Hēnare, a farmer from Motatau in the Bay of Islands, was selected as National's candidate at a meeting at Otiria marae.

Social Credit
William Clarke, a dairy farmer from Kaitaia was selected by the Social Credit Party. He had stood in the seat for Social Credit at the previous election.

Others

- Hohaia Tokowha Mokaraka, a Māori carving expert from Mount Eden stood as an independent candidate.
- Hemi Kuit Peita, was nominated by the Kauhanganui movement.

== Results ==
The following table gives the election results:

1963 Northern Maori by-election
Party	Candidate	Votes	%	±%
Labour	Matiu Rata	3,090	42.04	
National	James Henare	2,643	35.96	
Independent Labour	Eru Moka Pou	562	7.65	
Social Credit	William Clarke	340	4.63	−11.38
Independent	Te Kaiaraiha Hui	268	3.65	
Independent	Whina Cooper	257	3.50	
Independent Labour	Paikea Henare Toka	143	1.95	
Independent	Hohaia Tokowha Mokaraka	25	0.34	
Kauhanganui	Hemi Kuit Peita	22	0.30	
Majority		447	6.08	
Turnout		7,350	58.10	−17.49
Registered electors		12,651		
Labour hold		Swing		

The by-election was the closest National has come to winning a Maori seat since 1943, although National's Auckland division did not appreciate the opportunity with a Hēnare descendant and support from Ngāti Whātua, and gave little money and backing to their candidate; for which they were later criticised by the "more astute" South Auckland and Wellington Division leaders. Hēnare still got the largest swing to National in a by-election in the party's history, with Labour having only a 447-vote majority compared with 3,372 at the previous general election. And over the next 20 years, National's vote in the four Maori seats shrunk to about ten percent, similar to the Social Credit vote.
