= Kate Andersen =

NZ teacher, community leader, writer

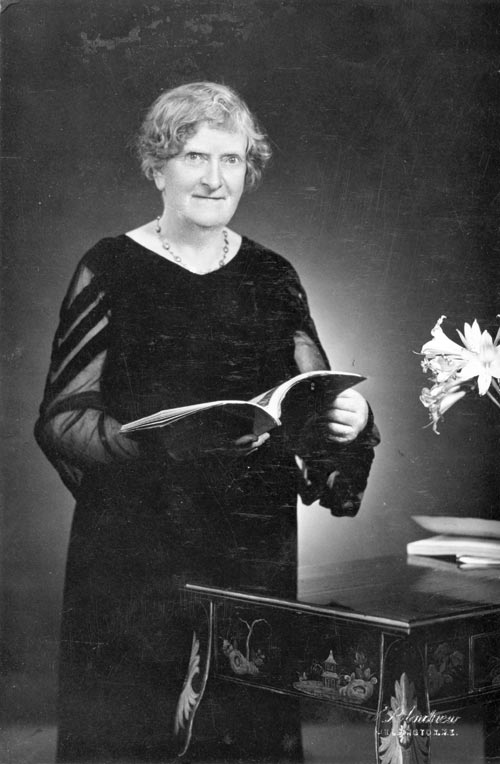
- Andersen in 1938
- Born: Catherine Ann McHaffie; 1 August 1870; Onehunga, New Zealand
- Died: 15 September 1957 (aged 87); Epsom, New Zealand
- Occupations: Teacher; community leader; writer
- Spouse: Johannes Andersen (m. 1900)
- Children: 2

Catherine Ann Andersen (née McHaffie; 1 August 1870 – 15 September 1957) was a New Zealand teacher, community leader and writer. She worked with a number of organisations promoting the interests of women and children, and was a founding member of both the Wellington Lyceum Club and the New Zealand Women Writers' and Artists' Society.

== Life and career ==
Andersen was born in Onehunga, Auckland, on 1 August 1870. She was the older daughter of James McHaffie, a Scottish clerk, and Ellen Leatherbarrow, a Londoner. Her father had come to New Zealand in the West Coast gold rush. The family moved to Christchurch in 1875 and when her mother died in 1881, Andersen took over running the household. She was educated, and later taught, at Christchurch Normal School. She married clerk Johannes Andersen in May 1900, after which she gave up teaching. They had two sons.

Andersen became involved in various community organisations. From 1910, she was a member of a committee that worked to establish a free kindergarten in Christchurch. In 1913 she joined a committee set up to found the Canterbury Women's Club in 1913. After the family moved to Wellington in 1915, she became a member of the council of the Wellington Free Kindergarten Association, and from 1919 to 1924 was one of the delegates to the Wellington branch of the National Council of Women of New Zealand. She resigned in 1924 after disagreeing with the Council's actions in a debate about maternal mortality. She subsequently joined the Wellington After-care Association, an association set up in 1928 to care for disabled people and to provide respite for parents and guardians. She remained on the committee until 1946.

In 1923 she was a founding member of the Wellington Lyceum Club, part of the International Association of Lyceum Clubs. Between 1926 and 1941 she was consistently the president or vice-president of the Club, and led a creative writing group which from 1928 published members' work in a magazine called The Lyceum. In 1932, she was a founding committee member of the New Zealand Women Writers' and Artists' Society. She was president from 1935 to 1937 and vice-president from 1937 to 1939. In 1935, she was appointed a justice of the peace. In 1936, Andersen and her husband travelled to Buenos Aires to attend the conference of PEN International. She was given honorary lifetime membership of the Women's Social Progress Movement and the Wellington Housewives' Association, and in 1945 founded the New Zealand Women's Biographical Society.

In 1946 the family moved to Auckland, where Andersen was active in the Auckland Lyceum Club. She died in 1957, survived by her husband and two sons.
