= James Hēnare =

New Zealand tribal leader, military officer, farmer and community leader

Sir James Hēnare
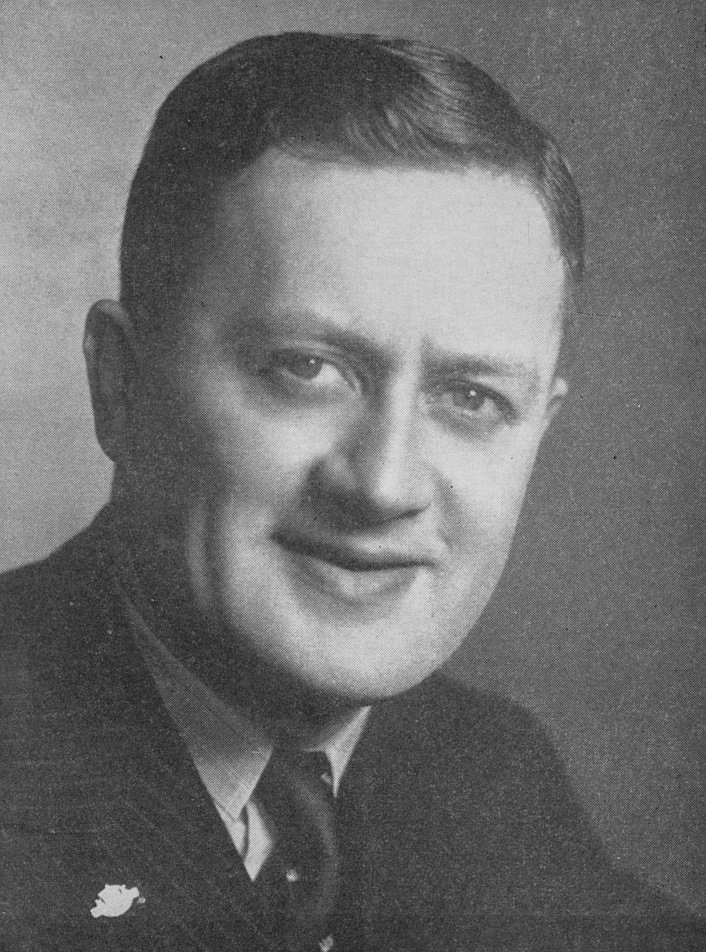
- Hēnare, c. 1940s
- Born: 18 November 1911; Motatau, New Zealand
- Died: 2 April 1989 (aged 77); Kawakawa, New Zealand
- Military career
- Allegiance: New Zealand
- Branch: 2nd New Zealand Expeditionary Force
- Service years: 1940–1946
- Rank: Lieutenant Colonel
- Commands: Māori Battalion (1945–46)
- Conflicts: Second World War; North African campaign; First Battle of El Alamein; Second Battle of El Alamein; Italian campaign; Battle of Monte Cassino
- Awards: Knight Commander of the Order of the British Empire; Distinguished Service Order; Mentioned in Despatches

Sir James Clendon Tau Hēnare, KBE, DSO (18 November 1911 – 2 April 1989) was a New Zealand tribal leader, military officer, farmer and community leader. He fought for four years with the Māori Battalion during the Second World War, was wounded at El Alamein, and with the rank of lieutenant colonel was the battalion's commanding officer when the war ended. He stood for Parliament for the National Party in the Northern Maori electorate on several occasions: 1946, 1949, 1951, 1963, and the 1963 by-election.

== Biography ==
Of Māori descent, Hēnare identified with the Ngāpuhi iwi. He was born in Motatau, Northland, the son of Taurekareka Hēnare and Hera Paerata. He was educated at Sacred Heart College, Auckland and at Massey Agricultural College.

Hēnare enrolled as a private in the Māori Battalion in 1940, training at Trenthham Military Camp. He served in the North African and Italian campaigns from 1941 to 1945 and was promoted to captain in 1942, followed by a promotion to major in 1944. He succeed Arapeta Awatere in 1945, becoming lieutenant colonel and commanding officer of the battalion. In 1953, Hēnare was awarded the Queen Elizabeth II Coronation Medal.

In the 1966 Queen's Birthday Honours, Hēnare was appointed a Commander of the Order of the British Empire, for services to the Māori people. In the 1978 New Year Honours, he was promoted to Knight Commander of the Order of the British Empire, for services to the community, especially Māori affairs.

James was present for the landing of the historical Hawaiian voyaging canoe Hōkūleʻa in Waitangi from its Rarotonga leg in December 1985 and the induction of its sailors as the 6th and most recent tribe of the Tai Tokerau.

Tau Henare, a member of parliament between 1993 and 2014, is his great-nephew. Peeni Henare, who was elected to parliament in 2014, is a grandson.
