= Taurekareka Hēnare =

New Zealand politician

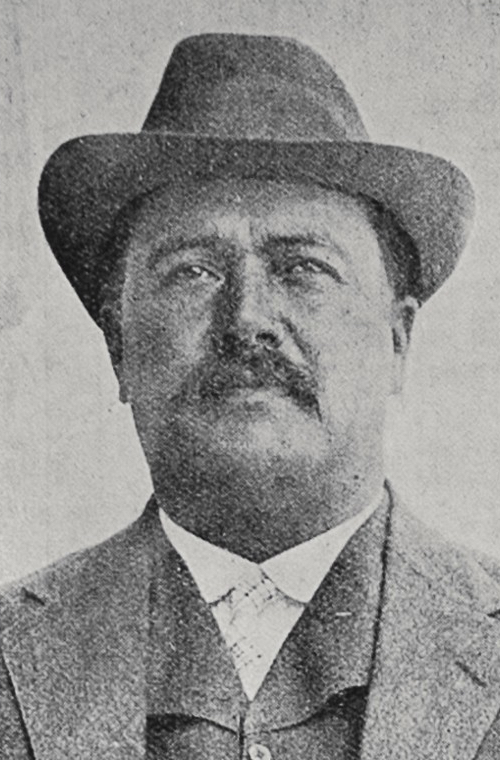
Hēnare, c. 1914

Taurekareka "Tau" Hēnare (1878 – 12 January 1940) was a Māori member of the New Zealand Parliament from 1914 to 1938, sitting for the Reform Party for most of that time, until it merged with the United Party to form the National Party in 1936.

== Background and early life ==
Hēnare was born at Pipiwai, where his father farmed, in the Bay of Islands, in 1878 (probably) or 1877. His father, Hēnare Wynyard, was said to be the son of Robert Wynyard, acting governor of New Zealand. His mother was Pane Peeni. Hēnare was initially given the name Taurekareka Wynyard, but later adopted his father's first name as his own surname – this was likely because Robert Wynyard had been active in fighting against Māori, and his grandson, raised as Māori, did not wish to bear his name. Hēnare was also closely related to a number of prominent figures of Māori history, including Hōne Heke. He was a member of the Ngāpuhi iwi, and his strongest affinity was with the Ngāti Hine hapū.

Hēnare had no formal education in the Western sense, but was taught Māori lore and traditions. He was raised for a time by Wi Pere (later to serve in Parliament) on the East Coast, but later returned north, possibly to avoid an arranged marriage. In 1903, Hēnare married Hera Paerata, whose mother Ritihia was Māori and father a member of the Subritzky family from Poland.

== Political life ==
New Zealand Parliament
Years	Term	Electorate	Party
1914–1919	19th	Northern Maori	Reform
1919–1922	20th	Northern Maori	Reform
1922–1925	21st	Northern Maori	Reform
1925–1928	22nd	Northern Maori	Reform
1928–1931	23rd	Northern Maori	Reform
1931–1935	24th	Northern Maori	Reform
1935–1936	25th	Northern Maori	Reform
1936–1938	Changed allegiance to:		National

In the 1914 election, Hēnare stood for the conservative Reform Party in the Northern Maori electorate of the Parliament, and won. He did not often participate in parliamentary debates, but was heavily involved in policy related to Māori interests. He worked closely with Āpirana Ngata, a member of the Liberal Party, on a number of important issues, and took part in the consolidation of Māori lands in the North Auckland area.

In World War I, Hēnare argued against conscription of Māori, and suggested that the return of confiscated lands might persuade Māori to volunteer. He also helped Māori soldiers re-establish themselves upon their return from the war. In the influenza epidemic of 1918 he assisted the delivery of healthcare to Māori. Hēnare's wife Hera was among those who died in the epidemic. Hēnare also played a role in shaping Reform Party policy on Māori issues. He supported the efforts of Gordon Coates, then Minister of Native Affairs, to expand the role of his department, and promoted reforms of the Māori school system.

Hēnare remained in Parliament until the 1938 election, when he was defeated by Paraire Karaka Paikea of the Labour Party who was affiliated with the Labour-aligned Rātana movement, whose rise Hēnare had opposed.

== Legacy ==
Hēnare died in 1940 at his farm near Kawakawa. He was survived by six sons and two daughters. His son, Sir James Hēnare, was a prominent military officer, and his daughter, Ihapera Taua, was an important figure in the Māori Women's Welfare League.

Two of this great-grandsons later served as members of the New Zealand Parliament: Tau Hēnare (as an MP for New Zealand First, then Mauri Pacific and later the National Party) and Peeni Hēnare (as an MP for the Labour Party).

New Zealand Parliament
Preceded by Te Rangi Hīroa	Member of Parliament for Northern Maori; 1914–1938	Succeeded by Paraire Karaka Paikea
