= Matiu Rata =

New Zealand politician

The Honourable Matiu Rata
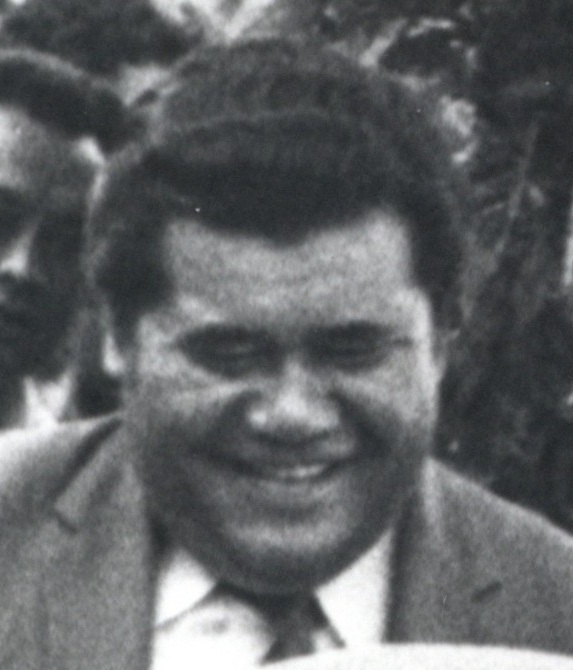

32nd Minister of Māori Affairs
- In office 8 December 1972 – 12 December 1975
- Prime Minister: Norman Kirk; Bill Rowling
- Preceded by: Duncan MacIntyre
- Succeeded by: Duncan MacIntyre

36th Minister of Lands
- In office 8 December 1972 – 12 December 1975
- Prime Minister: Norman Kirk; Bill Rowling
- Preceded by: Duncan MacIntyre
- Succeeded by: Venn Young

Member of the New Zealand Parliament for Northern Maori
- In office 16 March 1963 – 29 April 1980
- Preceded by: Tapihana Paraire Paikea
- Succeeded by: Bruce Gregory

Personal details
- Born: 26 March 1934 Te Hāpua, New Zealand
- Died: 25 July 1997 (aged 63)
- Party: Labour (1951–80); Mana Motuhake (1980–97)
- Other political affiliations: Alliance

Matiu Waitai Rata (26 March 1934 – 25 July 1997) was a Māori politician who was a member of the New Zealand Parliament for the Labour Party from 1963 to 1980, and a cabinet minister from 1972 to 1975. In 1979 he resigned from the Labour Party and formed the Mana Motuhake Party.

As the first Māori Minister of Lands, and the first Māori Minister of Māori Affairs, writes Tiopira McDowell, in the space of three years from 1972, "Rata reformed Māori land policies, elevated the status of the Treaty of Waitangi and Waitangi Day, increased government spending on housing and education and initiated a small but significant shift towards the protection and recognition of Māori language and culture. The Waitangi Tribunal he was instrumental in establishing would be his most lasting and significant contribution to the nation's political history."

== Early life ==
Rata was born at Te Hāpua to Te Āta (Arthur) Waitai Rata and Mereana Harowe. His tribal connections were with Ngāti Kurī, Te Aupōuri and Ngāti Whātua. He moved to Te Wharau, near Dargaville, with his family in 1942. His father died in a logging accident when he was 10, in December 1944; his mother Mereana moved to Freemans Bay in Auckland with her four children to find work as a cleaner. The entire family lived in one room in a rambling house, home to eleven other families, all of whom shared the outhouse.

Rata joined the Labour Party in his teens, in 1951 during the waterfront dispute. "'When you lived in Nelson Street,' he said, 'where 11 families lived in one house, well, there has got to be something better than that.'" wrote Paula Morris, quoting Rata. "[His] childhood experiences formed his sense of social injustice, and therefore his politics."

By late 1947, a polio epidemic was closing Auckland schools. It is believed that this outbreak ended Rata’s formal schooling.

== Work and personal life ==
Rata became a merchant seaman in 1950, at the age of sixteen. Four years later he left marine service, and married Nellie Ererua, possibly around 1957, the year his mother died. During these years, he worked as a farm labourer, truck driver and spray painter. In 1960, Rata started work as a spray painter at the Ōtāhuhu Railway Workshops, where he became a union organiser, rising to join the Ōtāhuhu executive of the Amalgamated Society of Railway Servants. He became chairperson of his local Labour Party branch, and Auckland Labour area organiser for Tapihana Paikea, the Northern Māori member of parliament. Paikea died in January 1963, and Rata won the resulting by-election, becoming a Member of Parliament in March 1963 at the age of 28.

Rata was a committed member of the Rātana Church. He had three children – two sons and a daughter.

== Political career ==
New Zealand Parliament
Years	Term	Electorate	Party
1963	33rd	Northern Maori	Labour
1963–1966	34th	Northern Maori	Labour
1966–1969	35th	Northern Maori	Labour
1969–1972	36th	Northern Maori	Labour
1972–1975	37th	Northern Maori	Labour
1975–1978	38th	Northern Maori	Labour
1978–1979	39th	Northern Maori	Labour
1979–1980	Changed allegiance to:		Independent

Rata was a Member of Parliament for Northern Maori from a 1963 by-election to 1980.

He was the Minister of Lands and Minister of Māori Affairs in the Third Labour Government of New Zealand between 1972 and 1975. He was the architect of both the Māori Affairs Amendment Act of 1974, which gave Māori greater control over their land, and the 1975 creation of the Waitangi Tribunal.

In 1979 he resigned from the Labour Party. In 1980 he resigned from Parliament and formed the Mana Motuhake Party to contest the resulting 1980 by-election. He was defeated by Bruce Gregory, coming second with 991 fewer votes than Gregory.

Following his exit from Parliament Matiu Rata was the leader of the Muriwhenua in presenting their Treaty of Waitangi claims to the Waitangi Tribunal, resulting in a settlement of Māori fishing claims for the tribes of the Far North.

He contested Northern Maori at every election from 1981 to 1990 for Mana Motuhake and in 1993 for the Alliance. In 1994 he retired from the Mana Motuhake leadership in favour of Alliance MP Sandra Lee.

Rata died on 25 July 1997 from injuries received eight days earlier when his car was hit head on by a vehicle driven by a foreign tourist who reportedly fell asleep at the wheel.

Rata's widow, Nellie Rata, stood for ACT in Te Tai Tokerau at the 1999 general election, having been unsuccessful in securing the Alliance nomination. She received 280 votes, to finish in seventh place in the 13-candidate race.

Political offices
Preceded by Duncan MacIntyre	Minister of Māori Affairs; 1972–1975	Succeeded by Duncan MacIntyre
Preceded by Duncan MacIntyre	Minister of Lands; 1972–1975	Succeeded by Venn Young
New Zealand Parliament
Preceded by Tapihana Paraire Paikea	Member of Parliament for Northern Maori; 1963–1980	Succeeded by Bruce Gregory
