= Madeline Best =

New Zealand woman artist

- Born: Madeline Best; 4 August 1854; Tawa, New Zealand
- Died: 28 October 1944 (aged 90); Ōtaki
- Occupation: Artist
- Known for: Artistic Works
- Relatives: Elsdon Best (Brother)

Madeline Best (4 August 1854 – 28 October 1944) was a New Zealand artist, who taught drawing, oil painting, watercolours and lustre painting. She was exhibited at the Auckland Society of Arts, the Fine Arts Association, Wellington and New Zealand Academy of Fine Arts.

== Biography ==
Madeline Best was born to Hannah and William Best in Tawa on 4 August 1854, and was the younger sister to Elsdon Best. She moved with her family from Tawa to Wellington in 1861, when her father, Willam Best, became chief clerk to the Treasury. They resided in Tinakori Road. She later moved to Ōtaki with her mother, Hannah Best, where she lived for the rest of her life.

She took pupils from at least 1870 and taught drawing, oil painting, watercolours and lustre painting.

She died at 90 years old on 28 October 1944, and was interred in Ōtaki Cemetery alongside her brother Walter and sister-in-law Olive.

== Works ==
Best was exhibited at the Auckland Society of Arts, the Fine Arts Association, Wellington (1883–44) and New Zealand Academy of Fine Arts (1883–1894).

Her exhibition in 1888 at the New Zealand Academy of Fine Arts, received the following note "Miss Madeline Best sends five exhibits of considerable merit; "Daffodils" (No. 146) and "Japanese Lilies on Screen" (No. 200) are the best. There is a bold expression in all her works. The colouring is very effective. We should like to see her attempt more ambitious works next season."

Platts reports that there is a record from her mother's writings that on 12 August 1903 "she was 'out sketching the Ōtaki Church' (Rangiatea) and that she had 'taken two views' of the Simcox's homestead "Forest Lakes" at Ōtaki."

Her works are represented in the Turnbull Library.
