= Wi Katene =

New Zealand politician

The Honourable Wiremu Katene
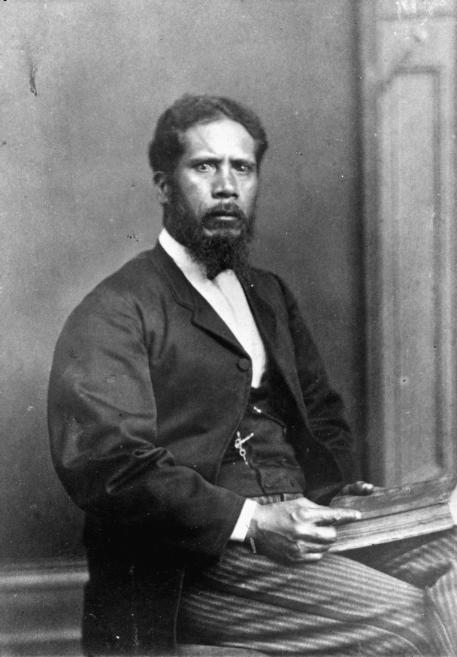
- Wiremu Katene circa 1871

Minister without portfolio
- In office Nov 1872 – Feb 1876
- Prime Minister: George Waterhouse; Sir William Fox; Sir Julius Vogel; Daniel Pollen

Personal details
- Died: 1 November 1895
- Party: None
- Relatives: Hana-Rawhiti Maipi-Clarke (fourth great-granddaughter)

New Zealand Parliament
Years	Term	Electorate	Party
1871–1875	5th	Northern Maori	Independent
1887	9th	Northern Maori	Independent

Wiremu Katene (died 1 November 1895), also known as Wi Katene, was a New Zealand politician.

In 1872 he became the first Māori to be appointed to the Executive Council, becoming the first indigenous Minister of the Crown. He was also a member of the House of Representatives from 1871 to 1875, and again in 1887.

He died on 1 November 1895. The politician Hana-Rawhiti Maipi-Clarke is a descendant.

New Zealand Parliament
Preceded by Frederick Nene Russell	Member of Parliament for Northern Maori; 1871–1875; 1887	Succeeded by Hori Tawhiti
Preceded by Ihaka Hakuene	Member of Parliament for Northern Maori; 1871–1875; 1887	Succeeded by Sydney Taiwhanga
