= Northern Maori =

Northern Maori was one of New Zealand's four original parliamentary Māori electorates established in 1868, along with Eastern Maori, Western Maori and Southern Maori. In 1996, with the introduction of mixed-member proportional representation, the Maori electorates were updated, and Northern Maori was replaced with the Te Tai Tokerau electorate.

== Population centres ==
The electorate included the following population centres (more than 5,000 inhabitants as of 2025): Auckland, Whangārei, Kerikeri, Kaitaia, and Tākiwira.

== Tribal areas ==
The electorate included the following tribal areas: Ngati Kuri, Te Aupouri, Ngati Kahu, Te Rarawa, Nga Puhi, and Ngati Whatua.

== History ==
The Northern Maori electorate boundary was in South Auckland. It extended from Auckland City north to Northland, and had only minor boundary changes from 1868 to 1996.

The first member of parliament for Northern Maori from 1868 was Frederick Nene Russell; he retired in 1870. The second member of parliament from 1871 to 1875 and in 1887 was Wi Katene.

In the 1879 election there was some doubt about the validity of the election result, and a law was passed to confirm the result in Northern Maori and two other electorates.

The electorate was held by Labour from 1938. Paraire Karaka Paikea died in 1943, and was replaced by his son Tapihana Paraire Paikea.

In 1979, Matiu Rata resigned from the Labour Party as a protest against Labour policies. In 1980 he resigned from Parliament, but came second in the subsequent by-election. The by-election was won by the Labour candidate, Bruce Gregory.

Tau Henare won the electorate from Gregory for New Zealand First in 1993; a foretaste of the success of Henare and the other New Zealand First candidates (known as the Tight Five) in the Māori electorates in 1996. In 1996 with MMP, the Northern Maori electorate was replaced by Te Tai Tokerau, and won by Henare.

Tau Henare is a great-grandson of Taurekareka Henare who had held the electorate for the Reform Party from 1914 to 1938.

=== Members of Parliament ===
The Northern Maori electorate was represented by 15 Members of Parliament:

Key

Independent Liberal Reform National Labour NZ First

Election	Winner
1868 Māori election	Frederick Nene Russell
1871 election	Wi Katene
1876 election	Hori Tawhiti
1879 election	Hone Tawhai
1881 election	Hone Tawhai
1884 election	Ihaka Hakuene
1887 by-election	Wi Katene
1887 election	Sydney Taiwhanga
1890 election	Sydney Taiwhanga
1891 by-election	Eparaima Te Mutu Kapa
1893 election	Hone Heke Ngapua
1896 election	Hone Heke Ngapua
1899 election	Hone Heke Ngapua
1901 by-election	Hone Heke Ngapua
1902 election	Hone Heke Ngapua
1905 election	Hone Heke Ngapua
1908 election	Hone Heke Ngapua
1909 by-election	Te Rangi Hīroa
1911 election	Te Rangi Hīroa
1914 election	Taurekareka Henare
1919 election	Taurekareka Henare
1922 election	Taurekareka Henare
1925 election	Taurekareka Henare
1928 election	Taurekareka Henare
1931 election	Taurekareka Henare
1935 election	Taurekareka Henare
1938 election	Paraire Karaka Paikea
1943 election	Tapihana Paraire Paikea
1946 election	Tapihana Paraire Paikea
1949 election	Tapihana Paraire Paikea
1951 election	Tapihana Paraire Paikea
1954 election	Tapihana Paraire Paikea
1957 election	Tapihana Paraire Paikea
1960 election	Tapihana Paraire Paikea
1963 by-election	Matiu Rata
1963 election	Matiu Rata
1966 election	Matiu Rata
1969 election	Matiu Rata
1972 election	Matiu Rata
1975 election	Matiu Rata
1978 election	Matiu Rata
1980 by-election	Bruce Gregory
1981 election	Bruce Gregory
1984 election	Bruce Gregory
1987 election	Bruce Gregory
1990 election	Bruce Gregory
1993 election	Tau Henare

== Election results ==
Note that the affiliation of many early candidates is not known.

=== 1993 election ===
1993 general election: Northern Maori
Party	Candidate	Votes	%	±%
NZ First	Tau Henare	5,654	33.75	
Labour	Bruce Gregory	5,238	31.27	−17.71
Alliance	Matiu Rata	4,422	26.39	−14.50
National	Dick Dargaville	709	4.23	−5.88
Mana Māori	Leslie Te Kooti	443	2.64	
Christian Heritage	Tui Cruickshank	209	1.24	
Natural Law	Mere Austin	75	0.44	
Majority		416	2.48	
Turnout		16,750	64.32	+3.78
Registered electors		26,041		

=== 1990 election ===
1990 general election: Northern Maori
Party	Candidate	Votes	%	±%
Labour	Bruce Gregory	5,789	48.98	−8.93
Mana Motuhake	Matiu Rata	4,833	40.89	+9.32
National	Dick Dargaville	1,195	10.11	
Majority		956	8.09	−18.24
Turnout		11,817	60.54	−10.24
Registered electors		19,517		

=== 1987 election ===
1987 general election: Northern Maori
Party	Candidate	Votes	%	±%
Labour	Bruce Gregory	7,760	57.91	−11.58
Mana Motuhake	Matiu Rata	4,231	31.57	+13.11
National	E Albert	1,079	8.05	
Democrats	P H McKay	329	2.45	
Majority		3,529	26.33	−24.69
Turnout		13,399	70.78	−5.73
Registered electors		18,928		

=== 1984 election ===
1984 general election: Northern Maori
Party	Candidate	Votes	%	±%
Labour	Bruce Gregory	10,471	69.49	+15.40
Mana Motuhake	Matiu Rata	2,783	18.46	−4.50
National	W Henskes	949	6.29	
NZ Party	Fred Brown	492	3.26	
Social Credit	I Joyce	373	2.47	
Majority		7,688	51.02	+20.95
Turnout		15,068	76.51	+2.93
Registered electors		19,693		

=== 1981 election ===
1981 general election: Northern Maori
Party	Candidate	Votes	%	±%
Labour	Bruce Gregory	6,368	54.09	+1.68
Mana Motuhake	Matiu Rata	2,703	22.96	−14.94
Social Credit	P Campbell	1,573	13.36	
National	Joan Tautari	1,004	8.52	
Independent	H G B Birch	124	1.05	
Majority		3,541	30.07	+15.56
Turnout		11,772	73.58	+32.20
Registered electors		15,997		

=== 1980 by-election ===
1980 Northern Maori by-election
Party	Candidate	Votes	%	±%
Labour	Bruce Gregory	3,580	52.41	
Mana Motuhake	Matiu Rata	2,589	37.90	
Social Credit	Joe Toia	560	8.20	
Cheer Up	Wallace Hetaraka	80	1.17	
Christian Democratic	Tom Weal	13	0.19	
Reform Party	P Te W Warner	9	0.13	
Majority		991	14.51	
Turnout		6,831	41.38	
Labour hold		Swing		

=== 1978 election ===
1978 general election: Northern Maori
Party	Candidate	Votes	%	±%
Labour	Matiu Rata	6,071	71.46	+1.77
Social Credit	Joe Toia	1,227	14.44	+8.63
National	Grant Pirihi	1,049	12.34	
Values	Christine Marriner-Grubb	148	1.74	−0.94
Majority		4,844	57.02	+8.71
Turnout		8,495	37.04	−21.34
Registered electors		22,933		

=== 1975 election ===
1975 general election: Northern Maori
Party	Candidate	Votes	%	±%
Labour	Matiu Rata	5,988	69.69	−8.02
National	Winston Peters	1,873	21.79	
Social Credit	Joe Toia	500	5.81	−1.01
Values	Christine Marriner-Grubb	231	2.68	
Majority		4,151	48.31	−16.82
Turnout		8,592	58.38	−16.58
Registered electors		14,715		

=== 1972 election ===
1972 general election: Northern Maori
Party	Candidate	Votes	%	±%
Labour	Matiu Rata	6,276	77.71	−3.03
National	Graham Latimer	1,016	12.58	−4.38
Social Credit	Joe Toia	551	6.82	
New Democratic	Dover Samuels	147	1.82	
Ind. Social Credit	Matakino Sadler	86	1.06	
Majority		5,260	65.13	−7.42
Turnout		8,076	74.96	−1.32
Registered electors		10,773		

=== 1969 election ===
1969 general election: Northern Maori
Party	Candidate	Votes	%	±%
Labour	Matiu Rata	6,157	74.68	+7.09
National	Graham Latimer	1,399	16.96	
Social Credit	Peta Wairua	688	8.34	−5.48
Majority		4,758	57.71	+8.70
Turnout		8,244	76.28	+5.83
Registered electors		10,807		

=== 1966 election ===
1966 general election: Northern Maori
Party	Candidate	Votes	%	±%
Labour	Matiu Rata	5,926	67.59	+9.23
National	F R Wilcox	1,629	18.58	
Social Credit	Peta Wairua	1,212	13.82	
Majority		4,297	49.01	+28.24
Turnout		8,767	70.45	−10.58
Registered electors		12,444		

=== 1963 election ===
1963 general election: Northern Maori
Party	Candidate	Votes	%	±%
Labour	Matiu Rata	5,965	58.36	+16.32
National	James Henare	3,842	37.58	+1.62
Social Credit	William Clarke	374	3.65	−0.98
Independent	B Birch	40	0.39	
Majority		2,123	20.77	+14.69
Turnout		10,221	81.03	+22.93
Registered electors		12,613		

=== 1963 by-election ===
1963 Northern Maori by-election
Party	Candidate	Votes	%	±%
Labour	Matiu Rata	3,090	42.04	
National	James Henare	2,643	35.96	
Independent Labour	Eru Moka Pou	562	7.65	
Social Credit	William Clarke	340	4.63	−11.38
Independent	Te Kaiaraiha Hui	268	3.65	
Independent	Whina Cooper	257	3.50	
Independent Labour	Paikea Henare Toka	143	1.95	
Independent	Hohaia Tokowha Mokaraka	25	0.34	
Kauhanganui	Hemi Kuit Peita	22	0.30	
Majority		447	6.08	
Turnout		7,350	58.10	−17.49
Registered electors		12,651		
Labour hold		Swing		

=== 1960 election ===
1960 general election: Northern Maori
Party	Candidate	Votes	%	±%
Labour	Tapihana Paraire Paikea	5,454	60.78	−4.11
National	George Russell Harrison	2,082	23.20	
Social Credit	William Clarke	1,437	16.01	
Majority		3,372	37.57	−10.86
Turnout		8,973	75.59	−6.91
Registered electors		11,870		

=== 1957 election ===
1957 general election: Northern Maori
Party	Candidate	Votes	%	±%
Labour	Tapihana Paraire Paikea	5,774	64.89	−0.39
National	Timothy James Davis	1,464	16.45	
Social Credit	Tuhirangi Maihi	773	8.68	+6.14
Independent Labour	Hoori Arapeti Henare Sutherland	529	5.94	
Ind. Social Credit	Walter Tepania	319	3.58	
Kauhanganui	Paepae Witehaka	39	0.43	
Majority		4,310	48.43	+1.39
Turnout		8,898	82.50	−17.79
Registered electors		10,785		

=== 1954 election ===
1954 general election: Northern Maori
Party	Candidate	Votes	%	±%
Labour	Tapihana Paraire Paikea	6,154	65.28	+4.05
National	Tono Waetford	1,719	18.23	
Social Credit	Mahuika Otene	1,314	13.93	
Independent	Tuhirangi Maihi	240	2.54	
Majority		4,435	47.04	+24.58
Turnout		9,427	100.29	+4.82
Registered electors		9,399 (Note: The number of electors on the official Māori rolls were often inaccurate hence the impossible turn-out figure)		

=== 1951 election ===
1951 general election: Northern Maori
Party	Candidate	Votes	%	±%
Labour	Tapihana Paraire Paikea	5,812	61.23	+2.25
National	James Henare	3,680	38.76	+0.27
Majority		2,132	22.46	+1.98
Turnout		9,492	95.47	−18.39
Registered electors		9,942		

=== 1949 election ===
1949 general election: Northern Maori
Party	Candidate	Votes	%	±%
Labour	Tapihana Paraire Paikea	5,841	58.98	+0.25
National	James Henare	3,812	38.49	+6.66
Independent	Mahuika Otene	93	0.93	
Kauhanganui	Pene Tuwhare	30	0.30	
Informal votes		127	1.28	−0.10
Majority		2,029	20.48	−6.41
Turnout		9,903	113.86	
Registered electors		8,697 (Note: The number of electors on the official Māori rolls were often inaccurate hence the impossible turn-out figure)		

=== 1946 election ===
1946 general election: Northern Maori
Party	Candidate	Votes	%	±%
Labour	Tapihana Paraire Paikea	5,580	58.73	+6.45
National	James Henare	3,025	31.83	
Independent Labour	Louis William Poka	764	8.04	
Informal votes		132	1.38	−3.41
Majority		2,555	26.89	−2.09
Turnout		9,501		

=== 1943 election ===
1943 general election: Northern Maori
Party	Candidate	Votes	%	±%
Labour	Tapihana Paraire Paikea	4,398	52.28	
National	Eru Moka Pou	1,960	23.30	
Independent Labour	William Keina Poata	580	6.89	
Independent Labour	Paikea Herare Toka	278	3.30	
Independent	Kahi Harawira	259	3.07	
Independent	David William Taylor	234	2.78	
Democratic Labour	Paepae Witehira	143	1.69	
Independent	Samuel William Maioha	141	1.67	
Independent	Pene Tuwhare	16	0.19	
Informal votes		403	4.79	
Majority		2,438	28.98	
Turnout		8,412		

=== 1931 election ===
1931 general election: Northern Maori
Party	Candidate	Votes	%	±%
Reform	Taurekareka Henare	3,297	58.56	
Ratana	Paraire Karaka Paikea	2,109	37.46	
Independent	Hemi Whautere Witehira	224	3.98	
Majority		1,188	21.10	
Turnout		5,630		

=== 1909 by-election ===
1909 Northern Maori by-election
Party	Candidate	Votes	%	±%
Liberal	Te Rangi Hiroa	1,452	71.60	
Independent	Kaka Porowini	296	14.60	
Independent	Herepita Rapihana	280	13.81	
Independent	Hone Hapa	199	9.81	
Independent	Hone Wi Kaitaia	173	8.53	
Independent	Hetaraka Himi Hare	93	4.59	
Independent	Te Riri Maihi Kawiti	74	3.65	
Independent	Papa Uroroa	52	2.56	
Independent	Reihana Netana	25	1.23	
Turnout		2028		
Majority		1156	57.00	

=== 1901 by-election ===
1901 Northern Maori by-election
Party	Candidate	Votes	%	±%
Liberal	Hone Heke Ngapua	1,751	71.41	
Independent	Riapo Puhipi	416	16.97	
Independent	Eparaima Te Mutu Kapa	285	11.62	
Independent	Hapeta Henare	97	3.96	
Independent	Kiri Pararea	94	3.83	
Independent	Pouaka Parore	76	3.10	
Turnout		2452		
Majority		1335	54.45	

=== 1899 election ===
1899 general election: Northern Maori
Party	Candidate	Votes	%	±%
Liberal	Hone Heke Ngapua	1,453	64.15	−17.24
	Eparaima Te Mutu Kapa	367	16.20	−2.40
	Henry Flavell	225	9.93	
	Keritoke Te Ahu	126	5.56	
	Poata Uruamo	94	4.15	
Majority		1,086	47.95	−14.84
Turnout		2,265		

=== 1891 by-election ===
1891 Northern Maori by-election
Party	Candidate	Votes	%	±%
Independent	Eparaima Te Mutu Kapa	632	43.68	
Independent	Timoti Puhipuhi	515	35.59	
Independent	Wi Katene	300	20.73	
Independent	Haki Rewite	194	13.41	
Independent	Renata Tekawatuku	7	0.48	
Independent	Kipa Te Whatanui	1	0.07	
Turnout		1447		
Majority		117	8.09	

=== 1896 election ===
1896 general election: Northern Maori
Party	Candidate	Votes	%	±%
Liberal	Hone Heke Ngapua	1,706	81.39	
	Eparaima Te Mutu Kapa	390	18.61	
Majority		1,316	62.79	
Turnout		2,096 (Note: Whilst the source states the count was final, McRobie states the number of votes cast as 2,104.)		

=== 1890 election ===
1890 general election: Northern Maori
Party	Candidate	Votes	%	±%
Independent	Sydney Taiwhanga	661	48.82	
	Tinoti Pupipupi	394	29.10	
Conservative	Wi Katene	192	14.18	
	Wiremu Mikihana	107	7.90	
Majority		267	19.72	
Turnout		1,354		

== Notes ==
Footnotes:
