= Eparaima Te Mutu Kapa =

New Zealand politician (1842–1924)

Eparaima Te Mutu Kapa (1842 – 23 October 1924) was a 19th-century Māori member of the New Zealand parliament.

== Political career ==
New Zealand Parliament
Years	Term	Electorate	Party
1891–1893	11th	Northern Maori	Independent

Kapa, who was from the Aupōuri iwi in Northland, contested and won the 1891 by-election for the seat of Northern Maori. His predecessor, Sydney Taiwhanga, was elected for his second term in the 1890 general election, but died before the election results were announced.

As a member of the 11th New Zealand Parliament, Kapa spoke out in support of women's enfranchisement. He was also a member of the Māori Parliament, and reported to them the proceedings of the New Zealand Parliament.

Kapa contested the seat in the 1893 general election. Despite receiving significant support from women voters (who received voting rights that year), he was defeated by Hōne Heke Ngāpua. Ngāpua also defeated Kapa for the seat in the 1896 and 1899 elections. and the 1901 by-election

Kapa died at Te Kao on 23 October 1924.

== Family ==
Kapa was an uncle to the Te Aupōuri and Waikato leader Mutu Paratene Kapa.

New Zealand Parliament
Preceded by Sydney Taiwhanga	Member of Parliament for Northern Maori; 1891–1893	Succeeded by Hōne Heke Ngāpua
