= Tāpihana Paraire Paikea =

New Zealand politician

Dobbie Paikea
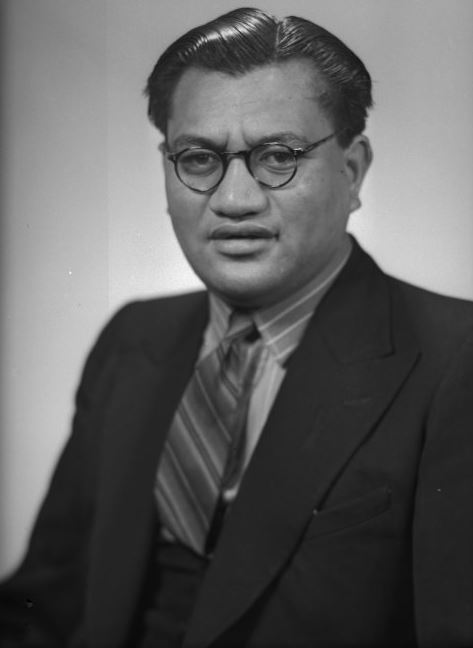

Member of the New Zealand Parliament for Northern Maori
- In office 24 September 1943 – 7 January 1963
- Preceded by: Paraire Karaka Paikea
- Succeeded by: Matiu Rata

Personal details
- Born: Tāpihana Paraire Paikea; 26 January 1920 Rangiatea, Kaipara, New Zealand
- Died: 7 January 1963 (aged 42) Oneriri, Kaiwaka, New Zealand
- Party: Labour
- Relations: Paraire Karaka Paikea (father)

Tāpihana Paraire "Dobbie" Paikea (26 January 1920 – 7 January 1963), also known as Dobson, was a New Zealand politician and Rātana morehu who won the Northern Maori electorate for Labour in 1943. He was a Māori of Te Roroa, Te Parawhau and Ngāti Whātua descent. He was elected following the death of his father Paraire Karaka Paikea who had been the MP, and he held the parliamentary seat until his own death in 1963.

== Early life ==
A foundation pupil of the Rātana Pa school, Paikea started work in the Native Affairs Ministry. He led the Rātana Morehu Brass Band, and organised the special train which took the Rātana followers from the Tai Tokerau area in the Far North to Rātana for the annual festivals. In 1940 he played some senior matches for the Manukau rugby league club in Auckland.

== Political career ==
New Zealand Parliament
Years	Term	Electorate	Party
1943–1946	27th	Northern Maori	Labour
1946–1949	28th	Northern Maori	Labour
1949–1951	29th	Northern Maori	Labour
1951–1954	30th	Northern Maori	Labour
1954–1957	31st	Northern Maori	Labour
1957–1960	32nd	Northern Maori	Labour
1960–1963	33rd	Northern Maori	Labour

Paikea was elected to replace his father at the 1943 general election on 24 September 1943. A by-election was to have been held on 19 June 1943, with two candidates, Paikea and Mr Samuel W. Maioha of Russell. But when the government announced a September general election, the requirement to hold a by-election was then avoided by a special Act of Parliament; the By-elections Postponement Act 1943, passed on 11 June 1943.

Paikea promoted Rātana and Maori issues. His maiden speech covered the economic and social contribution of the Maori war effort, Maori cultural pride and equal treatment for Maori and Pakeha. As a Member of Parliament for the Far North and based in Auckland, Paikea had a special emphasis for Tai Tokerau land claims and the needs of Maori moving to the city.

In 1953, Paikea was awarded the Queen Elizabeth II Coronation Medal.

During the Second Labour Government (1957–60) Labour held a working majority of one causing the party whips to impose strict discipline for attendance in the house to avoid the government losing a division. Media speculated that Paikea may be a weak link in this regard as his health was known to be poor and his attendance record in the previous parliament was not good. A well-worn joke in caucus was that senior whip Henry May was responsible for 38 members plus himself while junior whip Ritchie Macdonald was tasked with checking only on Paikea. During the three years of the government Paikea never put a foot wrong and not only had impeccable attendance but chaired the Maori Affairs select committee with skill. National MP Norman Shelton remarked on the change in attendance habits to which Paikea responded "In opposition, I was the only one worrying about my health. Now there are 40 others praying for me every night."

He remained a Member of Parliament for Northern Maori until his own death on 7 January 1963 at Oneriri. At the by-election caused by Paikea's death his uncle Paikea Henare Toka stood for the Labour Party nomination. He was not selected but stood as an independent Labour candidate, but finished seventh out of nine candidates with the official Labour candidate Matiu Rata winning.

== Notes ==
New Zealand Parliament
Preceded by Paraire Karaka Paikea	Member of Parliament for Northern Maori; 1943–1963	Succeeded by Matiu Rata
