= Sydney Taiwhanga =

19th-century Māori politician

New Zealand Parliament
Years	Term	Electorate	Party
1887–1890	10th	Northern Maori	Independent
1890	11th	Northern Maori	Independent

Hirini Rawiri Taiwhanga (c. 1832 – 27 November 1890), known as Sydney Taiwhanga, was a 19th-century Māori member of the House of Representatives.

Taiwhanga identified with the Ngāpuhi iwi. He was born in Kaikohe, Northland, New Zealand in about 1832; his father was Rawiri Taiwhanga.

He unsuccessfully contested the Western Maori electorate in the 1884 election. Of eight candidates, he came last with 5.5% of the vote. In the Western Maori 1886 by-election, he came fourth out of five candidates.

He represented the Northern Maori electorate from 1887 to 1890. He was re-elected in 1890 for Northern Maori, but died on election day, aged about 55. He had also stood in Eastern Maori, and came second.

A by-election was held in the Northern Maori electorate on 7 February 1891 to replace him.

New Zealand Parliament
Preceded by Wi Katene	Member of Parliament for Northern Maori; 1887–1890	Succeeded by Eparaima Te Mutu Kapa
