= 1919–1923 Dominion Museum ethnological expeditions =

Research expeditions studying Māori culture

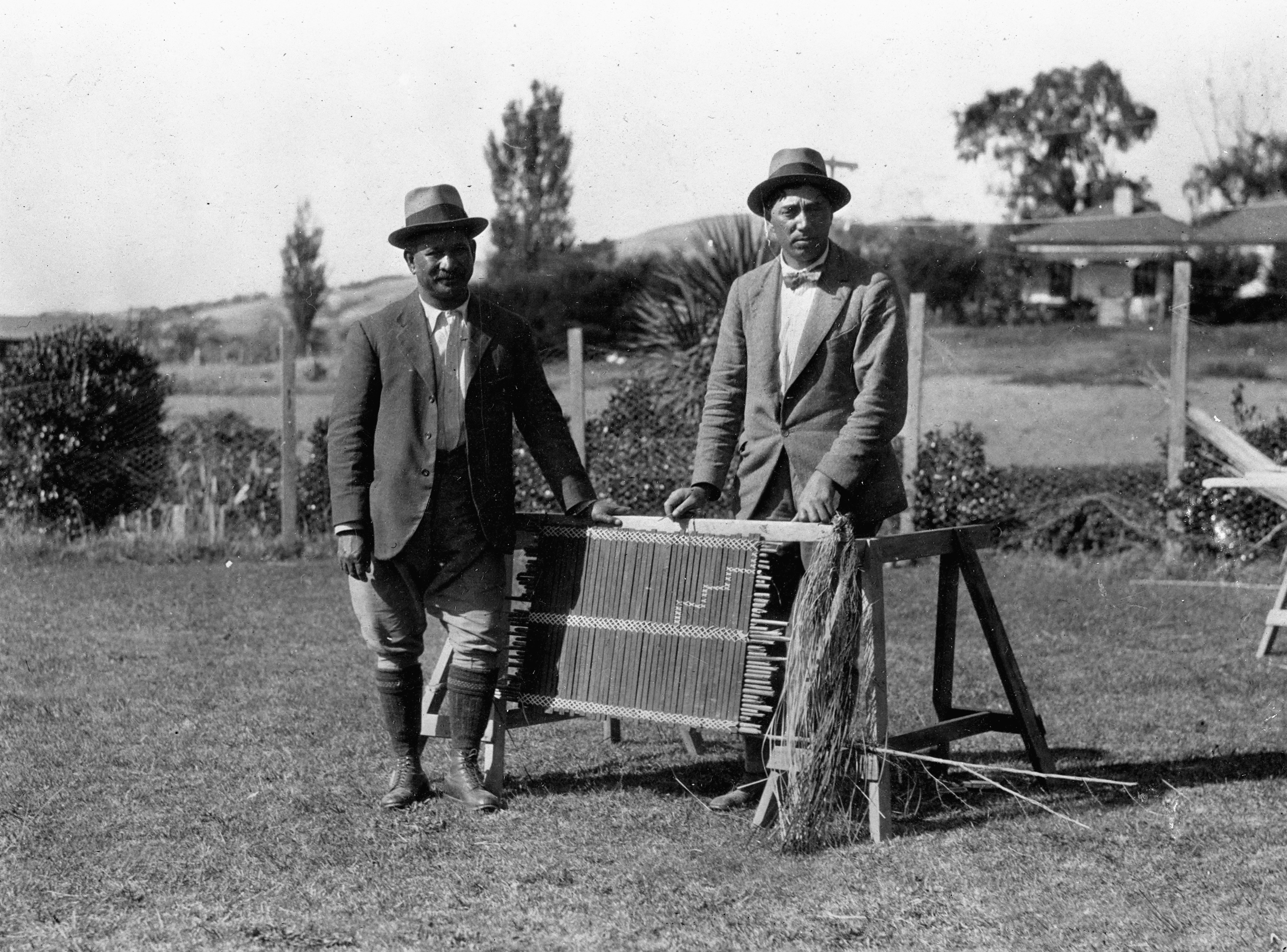
Āpirana Ngata (left) and Te Rangihīroa during the Fourth Dominion Museum ethnological expedition to Waiomatatini in 1923

The 1919–1923 Dominion Museum ethnological expeditions were a series of ethnological research expeditions encouraged and led by Āpirana Ngata and Te Rangihīroa, and undertaken between 1919 and 1923 with Elsdon Best, James McDonald and Johannes Andersen, to study Māori culture.

== Inception ==
The idea for the expeditions came while Āpirana Ngata was revising the Dictionary of the Māori Language. He wrote to the Minister of Internal Affairs saying,

"It was all very well collecting and defining words in a dictionary, but that didn’t very well serve a culture that had embedded its wisdom, traditions, and history in the nuances of spoken language rather than in literature."

He said it was better to send specialists out in the field to record the songs and oratory of Māori and to undertake,

“the ‘filming’ of hakas and pois, and of Maori village life, showing ‘tangis’, meetings, life on the cultivations and so on”.

Other research has points to Te Rangihīroa as being behind the idea of ethnological expeditions.

The four expeditions were across Te Ika-a-Māui, Aotearoa (North Island, New Zealand) and visited Gisborne, Rotorua, the Whanganui River region and Tairāwhiti / East Coast.

It was the first project of its kind in Aotearoa. Recording iwi and hapū around the North Island they captured knowledge of a range of fishing techniques, art forms like weaving, kōwhaiwhai, kapa haka, mōteatea, ancestral rituals and everyday life in the communities they visited. Māori were hit particularly hard by the 1918 influenza pandemic, with a death rate of fifty Māori people in one thousand, a rate eight times higher than the death rate of Europeans. Many of those killed by the virus were experts in mātauranga Māori, te reo, tikanga or had extensive knowledge in ancestral arts. Overall the purpose was to record Māori life, traditions, and language at a time when traditional knowledge holders were at risk.

== Dominion Museum staff ==
Johannes Andersen and James McDonald accompanied Elsdon Best on these expeditions and they were assisted at each venue by person's expert in Māori custom who could smooth the way for the Recordist.

During the 1923 East Coast expedition, Te Rangihīroa was again a member of the team, and Apirana Ngata was present for part of the time.

Of the three permanent team members, Best and McDonald were both staff members of the sponsoring institution. Best the ethnographer, McDonald the expert photographer and cinematographer and Andersen recruited because of his knowledge of music.

== Expeditions 1919-1923 ==
=== First Dominion Museum Ethnology Expedition, 2–16 April 1919, Gisborne. ===
- Participants: Elsdon Best, Johannes Anderson, James McDonald.

The expedition team was assembled to create recordings of a hui aroha to be held in Gisborne to welcome home the Māori (Pioneer) Battalion. The Battalion disembarked from the Westmoreland in Waitematā harbour, and 271 boarded the Mapourika to Gisborne to return home. A list of names of those disembarking can be found in an article in the Poverty Bay Herald, April 7, 1919, which can be read here on PapersPast.

The Hui Aroha has a massive undertaking and used the Poverty Bay Racing Club as a venue. Led by Āpirana Ngata, Captain William Tutepuaki Pitt, James Carroll, Heni Materoa Carroll, and an organising committee, tradesmen and labourers transformed the racecourse into a contemporary pā.

Documentation of the Hui Aroha, included photographs taken by James McDonald of food preparation and hāngī. Dictaphone recordings were made of waiata, pātere ("songs of derision in response to slander"), and karakia, but the excitement of the occasion was such that most were too busy to talk with the group from the Dominion Museum.

=== Second Dominion Museum Ethnology Expedition, 12 April - 8 May 1920, Rotorua. ===
- Participants: Elsdon Best, Johannes Anderson, James McDonald.

=== Third Dominion Museum Ethnology Expedition, 17 March - 18 April 1921, Whanganui River. ===
- Participants: Elsdon Best, Johannes Anderson, James McDonald, Te Rangihīroa.

=== Fourth Dominion Museum Ethnology Expedition ,18 March - 12 April 1923, Tairāwhiti / East Coast. ===
- Participants: Elsdon Best, Johannes Anderson, James McDonald, Te Rangihīroa, Āpirana Ngata.

== Collections ==
Photography and other records from the Dominion Museum Ethnological Expedition can be found in the Archives section, of the Museum of New Zealand Te Papa Tongarewa. The museum also has a series of sound recordings of Māori culture by Elson Best. The first set of recordings was made on expeditions to Gisborne 1919, Rotorua 1920 and the Whanganui River 1921. Other recordings done by Best can be found in the Christchurch Art Gallery collection.

Johannes Anderson had a diary for some of the later expeditions, and other work. It can be found in the Alexander Turnbull Library. It describes a visit (Mar-Apr 1923) to East Coast Maori pā (East Cape to Waipiro Bay) and Waiomatatini collecting recordings of Māori songs from Ngāti Porou. Also an account of a visit to Tauranga (Dec 1923) and Kapiti (Dec 1924 -Jan 1925).

The Alexander Turnbull Library also holds an album of photographs taken on the 1921, third expedition up the Whanganui River by James McDonald.

Ngā Taonga Sound & Vision holds some of the films James McDonald made from the First Dominion Museum Ethnology Expedition. (Te hui aroha ki tūranga, Gisborne hui aroha)

Further information relating to taonga collected on the expeditions can be found in the chapter Reconnecting Taonga by Billie Lythberg in the 2021 publication Treasures for the Rising Generation: The Dominion Museum Ethnological Expeditions 1919-1923. (pages 306–315)
