= Hōne Heke Ngāpua =

New Zealand politician

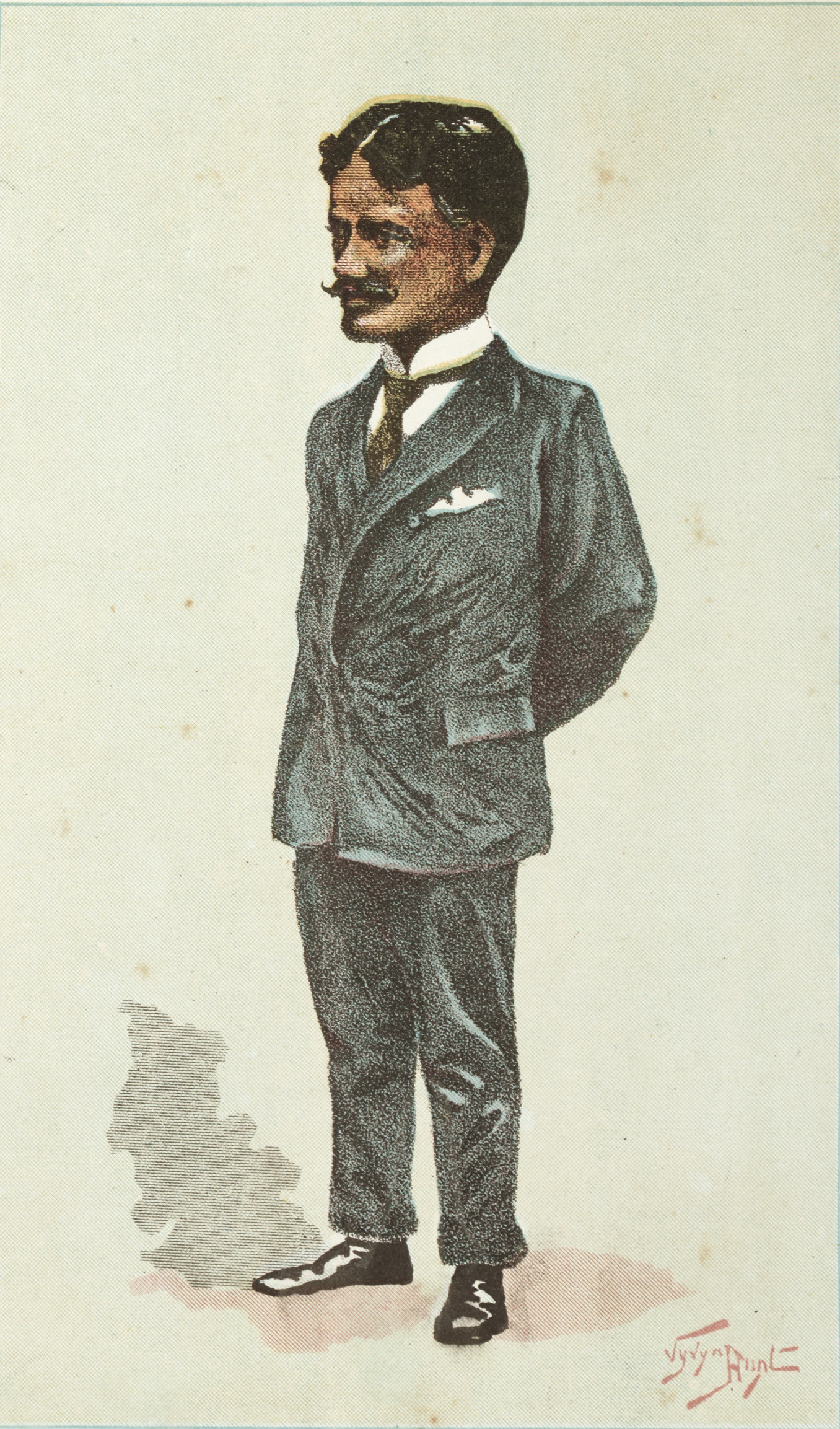
1896 caricature of Hone Heke Ngapua

Hōne Heke Ngāpua (6 June 1869 – 9 February 1909) was a Māori and Liberal Party Member of Parliament in New Zealand. He was born in Kaikohe, and was named after his great-uncle Hōne Heke. Ngāpua is best remembered for his advocacy for Te Kotahitanga, sponsorship of Māori autonomy in Parliament through a Native Rights Bill, and his successful intervention in the Dog Tax War of 1898.

== Biography ==
New Zealand Parliament
Years	Term	Electorate	Party
1893–1896	12th	Northern Maori	Liberal
1896–1899	13th	Northern Maori	Liberal
1899–1900	14th	Northern Maori	Liberal
1901–1905	14th	Northern Maori	Liberal
1902–1905	15th	Northern Maori	Liberal
1905–1908	16th	Northern Maori	Liberal
1908–1909	17th	Northern Maori	Liberal

Ngāpua was born on 6 June 1869 at Kaikohe, the eldest child of Niurangi Pūriri and Hōne Ngāpua. He never married. His paternal grandfather was Tuhirangi, the elder brother of Hōne Heke Pōkai. His paternal grandmother Waiopare, of Te Kawerau ā Maki and Tainui heritage, was taken from the Kawerau ā Maki settlement at Karekare during the Musket Wars.

He won the Northern Maori electorate in 1893, with the support of Kotahitanga. He was adjudged bankrupt and vacated the seat on 29 October 1900. However, he was re-elected to the seat in a by-election on 9 January 1901 (as Joseph Ward was in 1897). He died in Wellington of tuberculosis at only 40 while an MP in 1909.

In 1894, and again in 1896, Ngāpua introduced a Native Rights Bill sponsored by the Kotahitanga movement which sought political autonomy for Māori and a separate Māori Parliament. Ngāpua collaborated with Āpirana Ngata to eventually incorporate elements of the Native Rights Bill in the Maori Lands Administration Act and Maori Councils Act, both of which passed in 1900.

Ngāpua earned a reputation as a peacemaker through his two major interventions in disputes between Māori and the Crown. The first was in the Urewera survey trouble of 1895 in which Ngāpua counselled peace and prevented armed conflict from breaking out. In 1898, Ngāpua hastily returned to his electorate and arrived just in time to defuse a face-off between Māori led by Hōne Riiwi Tōia and Crown forces at the height of the Dog Tax War of 1898.

In the later years of his life Ngāpua was influential in the development of the Young Maori Party through his personal relationships and political collaborations with James Carroll, Ngata, and Peter Buck. Upon his death, Peter Buck took up his seat in the House of Representatives with the backing of Ngāpua's family and tribe.

== Notes ==
New Zealand Parliament
Preceded by Eparaima Te Mutu Kapa	Member of Parliament for Northern Maori; 1893–1909	Succeeded by Te Rangi Hīroa
