= Ihaka Hakuene =

New Zealand politician (1836–1887)

New Zealand Parliament
Years	Term	Electorate	Party
1884–1887	9th	Northern Maori	Independent

Ihaka Te Tai Hakuene (1836 – 6 April 1887) was a 19th-century New Zealand tribal leader, lay reader and a Māori member of the New Zealand parliament.

Of Māori descent, he identified with the Ngā Puhi iwi. He was born in Rawhiti, Northland, New Zealand. He represented the Northern Maori electorate from 1884 to 1887, when he died.

A report suggests that he was accidentally poisoned by a dish containing tinned beef when dining in Auckland.
