= Elsdon Best =

New Zealand historian (1856–1931)

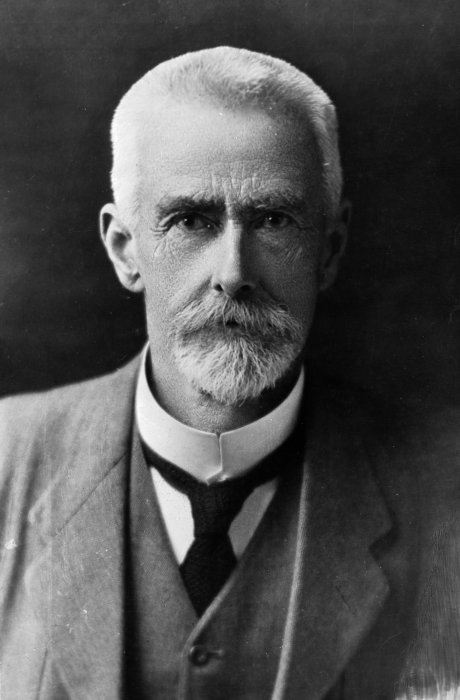
- Elsdon Best, 1931
- Born: 30 June 1856; Tawa Flat, New Zealand
- Died: 9 September 1931 (aged 75); Wellington, New Zealand
- Relatives: Madeline Best (sister)
- Awards: Hector Medal
- Scientific career
- Fields: ethnography

Elsdon Best (30 June 1856 – 9 September 1931) was an ethnographer who made important contributions to the study of the Māori of New Zealand.

== Early years ==
A photograph of Elsdon Best, Tom Wyatt and William Williams, at the Old Shebang on Cuba Street in Wellington in 1883.

Elsdon Best was born 30 June 1856 at Tawa Flat, New Zealand, to William Best and the former Hannah Haynes Nibbs. When his father obtained a position at the Colonial Treasury, the family moved from its farmstead at Grasslees Farm to Wellington, where Best, aged 9, went to school. After completing his formal education, he took and passed the Civil Service examination and became a clerk in 1873. Within a year he found the work uncongenial and moved to Poverty Bay, where he worked in farming and forestry.

In 1881 Best joined the Armed Constabulary. Based in the Taranaki at a time of increased tensions between the Māori and the colonial settlers in the area, he became involved in the arrests of protesters. Through the influence of his brother-in-law, Walter Gudgeon, he transferred to a Māori contingent and later that year he participated in the raid on Parihaka (November 1881). He left the Armed Constabulary after two years of service to travel to the United States of America, where he worked for three years, first in Hawaii and then in California, mustering cattle and doing forestry.

Best returned to New Zealand in 1886 and entered into a timber venture with his brother, using sawmilling equipment he had purchased in the United States. He also came into increasing contact with the Māori and, encouraged by Gudgeon and other notable settlers from the Taranaki, including Percy Smith, studied their language and culture. His timber business failed in 1891 and Best moved to Wellington, where he found work as a storeman. When Smith established the Polynesian Society in 1892 with the intention of promoting interest in and discussion of Polynesian history and culture, Best became a foundation member. For the Society's first edition of its Journal he wrote an article on the people of the Philippines. He also began a series of publications concerning the history of Wellington Harbour.

== Work among the Tūhoe ==
Photograph of Elsdon Best (left) sitting with Hone Nukunuku (right) on the steps of a house at Waiomatatini in the Gisborne Region, taking notes photographed in 1923 by James Ingram McDonald.

In 1895, when the Urewera district began to be opened up for European settlement, Best took a position as quarter-master with the road works, beginning in Te Whaiti. For the next 15 years, he worked in the district, using his presence in the area to build up a relationship with many Tūhoe elders and record the facts of the culture and traditions of the Tūhoe, which were still relatively intact. He recorded his observations in field records and note books that he kept now for the rest of his life. His relationship with Tutakangahau is the subject of a 2010 book by Jeffrey Paparoa Holman. Makurata Paitini, a Tūhoe weaver, served as his informant.

Best's devotion to his study, together with his facility in Māori, allowed him to win the confidence of the Tūhoe, whose traditions he published in a series of articles in the Transactions of the New Zealand Institute and the Journal of the Polynesian Society. In 1897, he published the monograph Waikaremoana, the Sea of Rippling Waters, With a Tramp through Tuhoe Land, in which he presented the lore of the district.

== Ethnologist ==
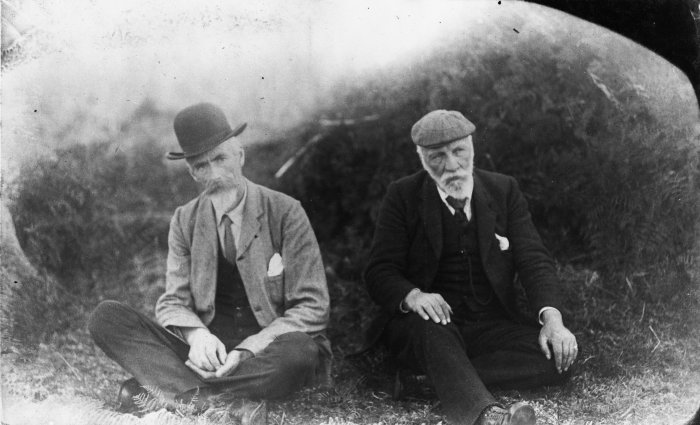
Elsdon Best with fellow ethnographer Percy Smith, 1908

In 1910, Best was appointed ethnologist at the Dominion Museum which allowed him to pursue his research in a more focused manner. In 1912, he published The Stone Implements of the Maori, which was followed four years later by an accompanying bulletin on Māori storehouses. In 1919, his The Land of Tara appeared, a history of the Māori of Wellington Harbour. A systematic survey of traditional Māori culture, The Maori, appeared in two volumes in 1924, and in 1925 Best's Tuhoe, the Children of the Mist. This a monumental study in 1200 pages of the traditional history and culture of tribe with which he had spent so much of his life. From 1919 to 1923 Best took part in each of the four Dominion Museum ethnological expeditions.

In 1914, Best was awarded the Hector Medal of the New Zealand Institute, and in 1919 he was made a fellow.

Best died in 1931 in Wellington, survived by his widow Adelaide (née Wylie). They had no children. His grandniece was Alison Drummond.

== Legacy ==
His ashes lay buried beneath the Elsdon Best Memorial, a granite obelisk erected in 1960 in his birth town of Tawa, at Grasslees Reserve. The nearby suburb of Elsdon, Porirua was named in his memory. The Elsdon Best Memorial Medal is for "outstanding scholarly work on the New Zealand Māori and may be in the fields of Māori ethnology, social anthropology, archaeology, prehistory or linguistics".

== Bibliography ==
- Holman, Jeffrey Paparoa (2018). « L’ethnographe du vieux temps māori : progrès et décadence dans la poésie et la vision du monde d’Elsdon Best », in BEROSE - International Encyclopaedia of the Histories of Anthropology, Paris. Contains a selective bibliography.
