= Te Kooti's War =

One of the last battles of the New Zealand Wars

- Part of New Zealand Wars
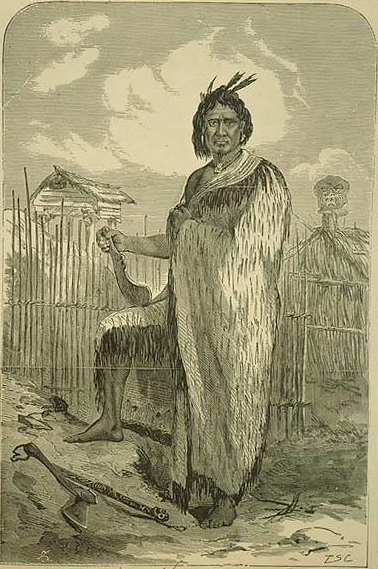
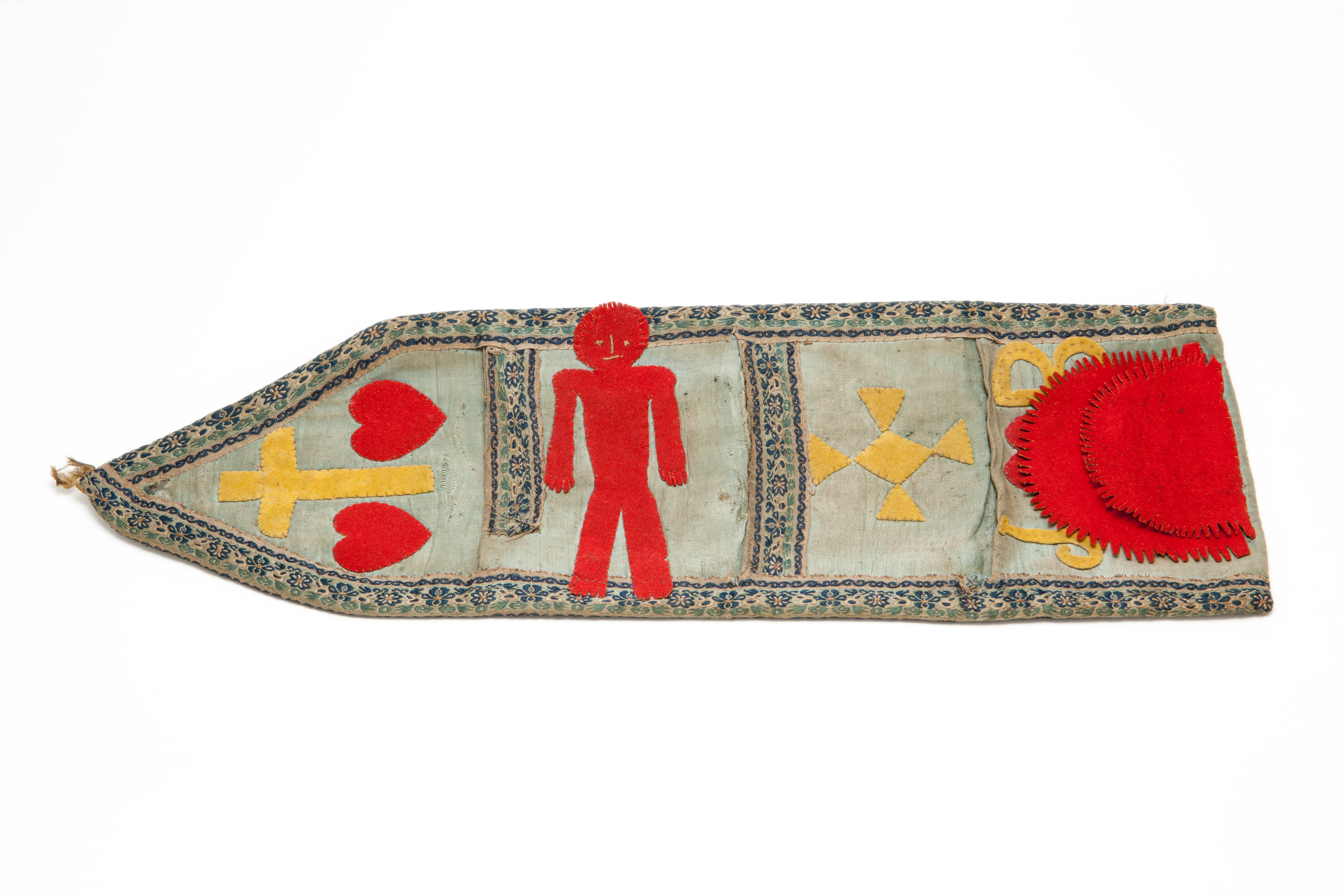
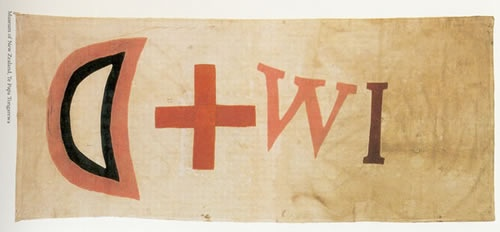
- Purported drawing of Te Kooti published 1869 (top); two of his banners (bottom)
Date	July 1868 – May 1872
Location	East Coast and central North Island, New Zealand

Belligerents
United Kingdom: Colony of New Zealand; Ngāti Porou; Ngāti Kahungunu	Ringatū adherents Pai Mārire adherents Ngāi Tūhoe; Ngāti Hineuru; Rongowhakaata

Commanders and leaders
(United Kingdom of Great Britain and Ireland) George Whitmore; Thomas McDonnell; Te Keepa; Ropata Wahawaha; William Mair; Hotene Porourangi; Gilbert Mair; Henare Tomoana; Renata Kawepo	Te Kooti; Te Rangitahau

Te Kooti's War was among the last of the New Zealand Wars, the series of 19th-century conflicts in New Zealand between the Māori and the colonising European settlers. It was fought in the East Coast region and across the heavily forested central North Island and Bay of Plenty from 1868 to 1872, between government military forces and followers of spiritual leader Te Kooti Arikirangi Te Turuki.

The conflict was sparked by Te Kooti's return to the East Coast after two years of internment on the Chatham Islands, from where he had escaped with almost 200 Māori prisoners of war and their families. Te Kooti desired to be left in peace but two weeks after their return to the mainland, members of his party found themselves being pursued by a force of militia, government troops and Māori volunteers. Te Kooti's force routed them in an ambush, seizing arms, ammunition, food and horses. The engagement was the first in what became a four-year guerrilla war, involving more than 30 expeditions by colonial and Māori troops against Te Kooti's dwindling number of warriors. Although initially fighting defensively against pursuing government forces, Te Kooti went on the offensive from November 1868, starting with a raid on Poverty Bay, in which selected European settlers, their families, and Māori opponents were murdered. The attack prompted another pursuit by government forces, one that included the siege at Ngātapa from which Te Kooti escaped but which resulted in the capture and execution of over 100 of his followers.

Te Kooti gained refuge with Tūhoe tribes, which consequently suffered a series of damaging raids in which crops and villages were destroyed, as other Māori iwi were lured by the promise of a £5000 reward for Te Kooti's capture. Te Kooti was finally granted sanctuary by the Māori king in 1872 and moved to the King Country, where he continued to develop rituals, texts and prayers of his Ringatū faith. He was formally pardoned by the government in February 1883 and died in 1893.

In modern times, much of the actions that occurred during Te Kooti's War, particularly in the early stages of the conflict, have been condemned as an abuse of law and human rights.

== Background ==
From 1843 to 1872, there were a series of conflicts in New Zealand between the local Māori people and British imperial and colonial forces, and their Māori allies. These clashes are collectively termed the New Zealand Wars. While some of the wars of this period were as a result of land confiscations or clashes with the Māori King Movement, many of the later conflicts were due to the rise of prophetic Māori leaders and religious movements which threatened the autonomy of the government. These movements also subverted tribalism so often were met with hostility by the leaders of many iwi (tribes) as well. Te Kooti's War was the last of these later wars, which involved the final field engagements of the New Zealand Wars.

=== Te Kooti ===
Te Kooti Arikirangi Te Turuki was born probably about 1831 into the Ngāti Maru hapū (subtribe) of the Rongowhakaata iwi (tribe) of the Māori people in Poverty Bay, south of East Cape. He desired to become a preacher but soon fell out with the Whakatō Anglican mission where he had been baptised in 1852. He gained a reputation for lawlessness and philandering in the Makaraka district near Tūranga, present-day Gisborne. His actions offended some of the local rangatira (chiefs) and because he also engaged in trading, undercutting local businessmen, became offside with some European settlers.

In early 1865, a new religion, Pai Mārire, the followers of which being known as Hauhau, was spreading among the Ngāti Maru in the East Cape. Te Kooti stayed clear of the faith and during the East Cape War, fought with kūpapa (loyal) Māori and Government troops against the Hauhau in the week-long siege of Waerenga-a-Hika, near Tūranga, in October. Many of the kūpapa were fighting reluctantly and Te Kooti's brother was among the Hauhau at Waerenga-a-Hika. Te Kooti was accused of being a spy and was arrested after the siege ended. Allegations were made by the Rongowhakaata chief Pāora Parau that Te Kooti had provided gunpowder to the Hauhau. He was released after an investigation, but five months later, on 3 March 1866, he was seized again on the orders of Captain Reginald Biggs, the local magistrate and militia commander. Fresh allegations had been made that he had provided covert assistance to a key leader of the Hauhau. However, the charges against him were probably false. Gilbert Mair later wrote that he did not consider allegations could be sustained against Te Kooti and the historian James Cowan also noted that many in Poverty Bay preferred Te Kooti be out of the way. Despite the likely untruth of the allegations, Te Kooti was deported, without trial, to the Chatham Islands.

=== Confinement and escape ===
On the Chatham Islands, around 300 prisoners were kept in poor conditions, forced to build their own housing and cultivate their food, while the Government worked towards the confiscation of their land. The prisoners were treated roughly by their guards and the harsh climate resulted in a number of deaths. During his confinement on the Chathams, Te Kooti began to have visions, following a period of illness. From these, he began to develop his own religion, which combined aspects of Christianity, drawn from the Old and New Testaments, and Māori beliefs. He called it Ringatū, or the Upraised Hand. He held services where he used phosphorus and legerdemain to create the illusion of flames being emitted from his hands. Even when placed in solitary confinement, he escaped at night to preach to his fellow detainees.

Promises had been made to the prisoners that they would be released after two years. While some senior rangatira were allowed to leave, it did not eventuate for the remaining prisoners and they grew increasingly frustrated at their confinement. By this time Te Kooti had ascended to a leadership role among the prisoners and held significant influence. On 4 July 1868 Te Kooti led a carefully planned and executed breakout from their internment, overpowering guards, seizing arms and ammunition and commandeering a schooner, the Rifleman, which was moored at the settlement of Waitangi. Te Kooti had ordered that no one be harmed but one guard was killed in the uprising by a prisoner seeking vengeance for harsh treatment. A total of 298 people—163 men, 64 women and 71 children—sailed out of the Chatham Islands for mainland New Zealand. Te Kooti and his Ringatū followers arrived at a secluded cove at Whareongaonga, about halfway between Tūranga and Māhia to the south, on 10 July. The Rifleman and its co-opted crew were allowed to leave after the ship was unloaded of its cargo and passengers and sailed for Wellington. In the meantime, the presence of the escaped prisoners became known to the residents of Poverty Bay. The Government also became aware of the situation, which was of particular concern since there had been an outbreak of hostilities with Māori of South Taranaki, on the opposite coast of the North Island, led by the prominent rangatira Tītokowaru. A separate conflict on the East Coast was clearly undesirable.

On 12 July, a local rangatira was sent by Biggs to seek the surrender of the escapees but Te Kooti refused. Having been held for over two years without trial, he did not trust the Government. He made it clear he did not wish to fight but would do so if he and his followers were forced to defend themselves or were hindered from travelling to the interior of the North Island, where he intended to establish a kingship to rival that of Tāwhiao, the Māori king.

== Pursuit ==
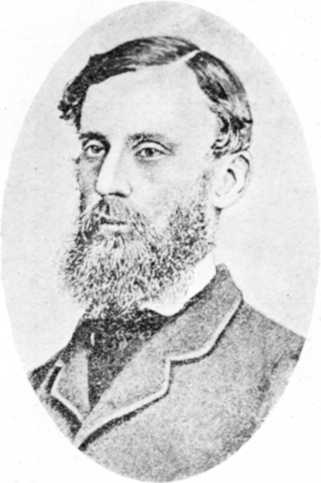
Major Reginald Biggs, militia commanding officer and Tūranga resident magistrate

Biggs scrambled to assemble a force with which to confront Te Kooti at Whareongaonga—his militia volunteers, the Mounted Rifles under Captain Charles Westrupp, and some kūpapa , nearly 90 men in total. Two other parties were raised; about 25 militia and 100 kūpapa set out from Wairoa in Hawke's Bay, while a few days later another 30 militia, accompanied by 40 kūpapa departed from Napier. The latter party, led by Colonel George Whitmore, the commander of the Armed Constabulary and in overall charge of the pursuit of Te Kooti, would later be joined by 50 men of the Armed Constabulary.

Meanwhile, the Ringatū departed Whareongaonga on 15 July and began making their way to Paparatu, a pā (hillfort) about 40 kilometres (25 mi) inland. Te Kooti's fighting force amounted to around 150 to 160 warriors although only 40 to 50 of them had firearms. The Ringatū narrowly avoided being intercepted by Biggs and his men, who arrived at Whareongaonga too late to stop them. On discovering he had missed Te Kooti, Biggs marched his 70-strong force to Paparatu via a more direct route through open country, intending to cut off his quarry as they crossed the Arai Stream. He and his men reached Paparatu on 18 July where Biggs left Westrupp in command and returned to Tūranga to organise a resupply. On the morning of 20 July, the government forces sighted Te Kooti's followers and moved onto two hills overlooking their route forward. Te Kooti split his armed men into two parties, one of which mounted intermittent attacks to the front as a diversion while the other worked its way around to the rear. This took several hours but at 4:00pm, the rearwards party attacked Westrupp's force, killing two Europeans and forcing a retreat. Te Kooti seized food, arms and ammunition and 80 horses.

Westrupp's men encountered Whitmore's advancing column the next day. Despite Whitmore's attempt to dissuade them, they refused to join his force and instead continued on back to Poverty Bay. The Wairoa force, commanded by Captain W. Richardson, was ordered to move against Te Kooti in order to delay their passage, while Whitmore took his men back to Napier to await his Armed Constabulary reinforcements. Richardson's party, depleted by at least 50 of the kūpapa who refused to fight, attacked Te Kooti at Te Koneke on 24 July. It was a halfhearted affair and after the Ringatū warriors began to flank Richardson's 75 or so men, the government forces withdrew and returned to Wairoa. Richardson claimed to have inflicted several casualties on Te Kooti's men but this was likely inflated while his own force had one man killed and another wounded, albeit in a friendly fire incident.

Whitmore's column, now reinforced with men of the Armed Constabulary and numbering around 200 men, followed Te Kooti's tracks, having set out from Tūranga on 31 July, from where they had been transported via ship from Napier. The weather was poor and swelled the local rivers which they had to traverse, making progress slow. On 5 August at Waihau, the Poverty Bay militia that were part of Whitmore's force refused to advance any further on the grounds they had reached the boundary of their district; Whitmore's harsh treatment of them may have also been a factor. With the militia went their allied kūpapa. These departures reduced the column to around 120 men. The adverse weather also affected the progress of Te Kooti's followers, which included women and children, to Paparatu.

At Ruakituri Gorge, downstream from Puketapu, on 8 August, Whitmore's column caught up with Te Kooti's force. The column was strung out along the gorge on account of the difficult terrain and exposed to fire from Te Kooti's men, some of whom had positioned themselves on an island mid-stream. Some militia and kūpapa of Ngāti Kahungunu managed to cross further downstream and fire on the reverse side of the island, which allowed the main body of Whitmore's force to withdraw. Five men were killed and six wounded, three of whom later died of their wounds. Ringatū casualties were two men killed and nine wounded, Te Kooti among them, but in his reports back to the government, Whitmore overstated Ringatū losses. The outcome of the pursuit of Te Kooti was an embarrassment for the government and the commitment of some of the kūpapa involved was questioned by some of the colonials. Nevertheless, Whitmore favourably noted the performance of the Ngāti Kahungunu kūpapa at Ruakituri Gorge.

== Buildup of the Ringatū ==
Resuming their trek, the Ringatū reached Puketapu a few days later. They would remain here for over two months, strengthening the pā's fortifications, collecting supplies, and receiving reinforcements. The succession of victories over the previous few weeks attracted more recruits to Te Kooti's cause, including Ngāti Kōhatu chief Korohina Te Rakiroa and some of his men.

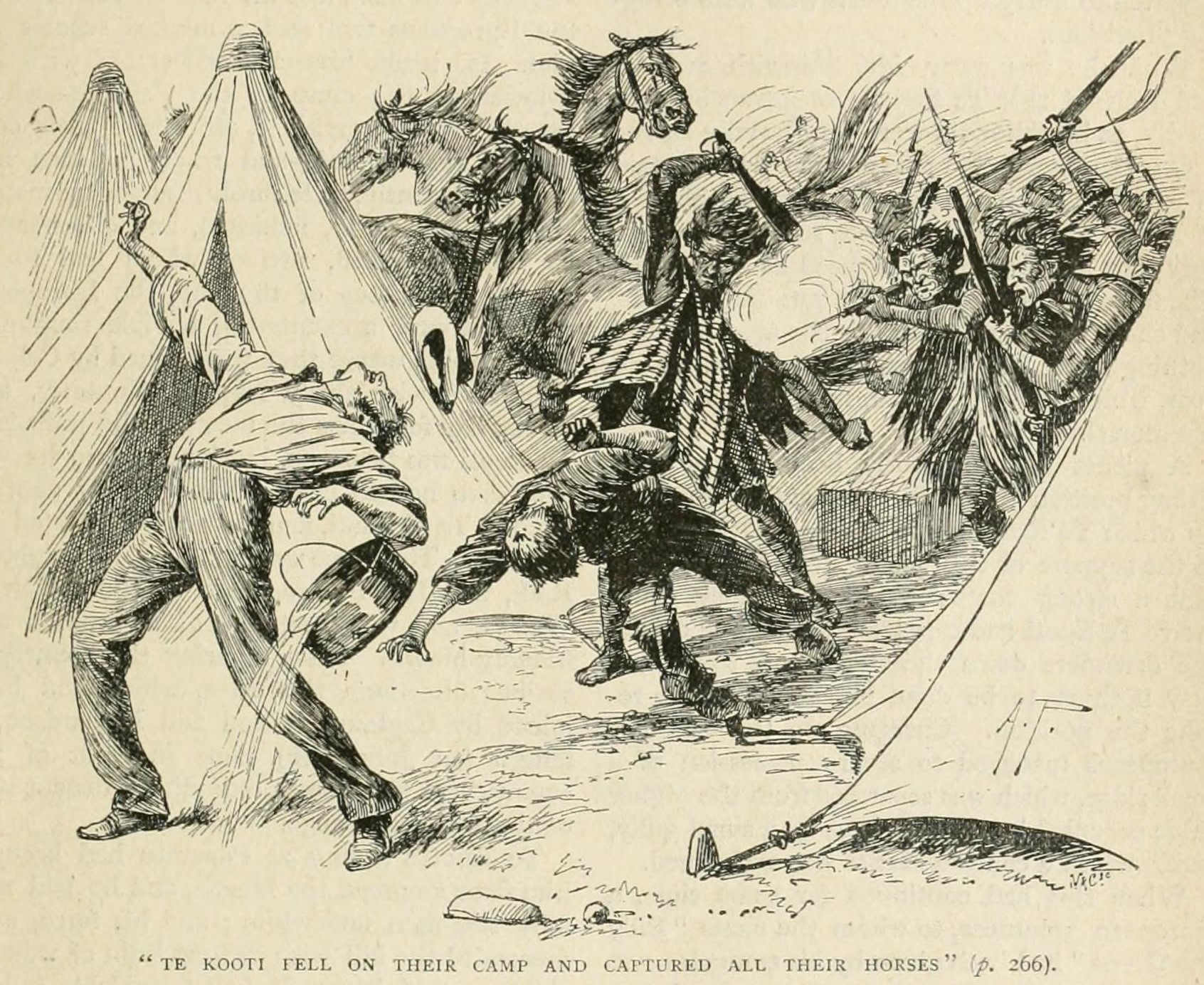
Fight of Paparatu in 1865 (Battles of the nineteenth century, no. 3, 1901). Artist: Alfred Pearse

Across the country in Taranaki meanwhile, government forces had suffered a defeat at the hands of Tītokowaru at Te Ngutu o Te Manu and Whitmore and his men were withdrawn in early September from the East Coast and sent to deal with the threat this presented. The government, eager to free further resources for use against Tītokowaru, seized the moment to offer Te Kooti a peace agreement. In mid-October Defence Minister Theodore Haultain directed that a message be sent to Te Kooti at Puketapu stating that if the prisoners surrendered themselves and their arms, no further proceedings would be taken against them and land would be found for them to live on. Catholic missionary Father Euloge Reignier was chosen to act as the emissary and negotiator, but was prevented from reaching Te Kooti and instead passed the message on via Pai Mārire warriors. If Te Kooti did receive the offer, he rejected it, suspicious of the government's intentions and aware that its scouts had reconnoitered Puketapu.

The Ringatū had increased their numbers with a number of recruits including a rangatira of inland Wairoa, Te Waru Tamatea, a Pai Mārire convert, and Nama, both of Ngāti Kahungunu. With them came about 50 of their men. Te Kooti solicited for more followers to support his movement, dispatching messengers to tribes at Ōpōtiki and Taupō as well as the much closer Tūhoe, in the Urewera. As a result, about 30 Tūhoe warriors joined the Ringatū at Puketapu. This increased the number of fighting men in the Ringatū to around 250, but several still lacked firearms. Te Kooti pondered his next move, a trek into the Waikato region. Accordingly he sought Tāwhiao's assent to enter the King Country and also asked Tūhoe chiefs permission to enter their land. While Tūhoe deferred their decision, Tāwhiao sent an outright rejection, warning the Ringatū would be repelled if they encroached on his territory.

== Poverty Bay attacks ==
In early October, anger was roused in Poverty Bay when it was discovered that followers of Te Kooti had murdered some Ngāti Kahungunu leaders at Whataroa on the Mangaaruhe River near Ohuka. Ngāti Kahungunu was furious and were motivated to seek utu (revenge). At the same time, intelligence was received that Te Kooti planned to attack Wairoa. This was false, and was a deception mounted by Te Kooti. He instead intended to raid Poverty Bay. To his followers he proclaimed: "God would give the Tūranganui country, and all the best places of the Europeans, back to him and his people".

As a result of Te Kooti's misinformation, Wairoa was reinforced, mainly with kūpapa, such that by 25 October, its garrison numbered about 700 men. It was then discovered that it was a false alarm. About 500 men set out from Wairoa for Puketapu under the command of Major Charles Lambert. They found it empty and returned to Wairoa on 6 November. As a precaution, Biggs, still considering an attack possible, posted scouts on the routes into the area coming from the south. He considered this the likely direction of Te Kooti's approach.

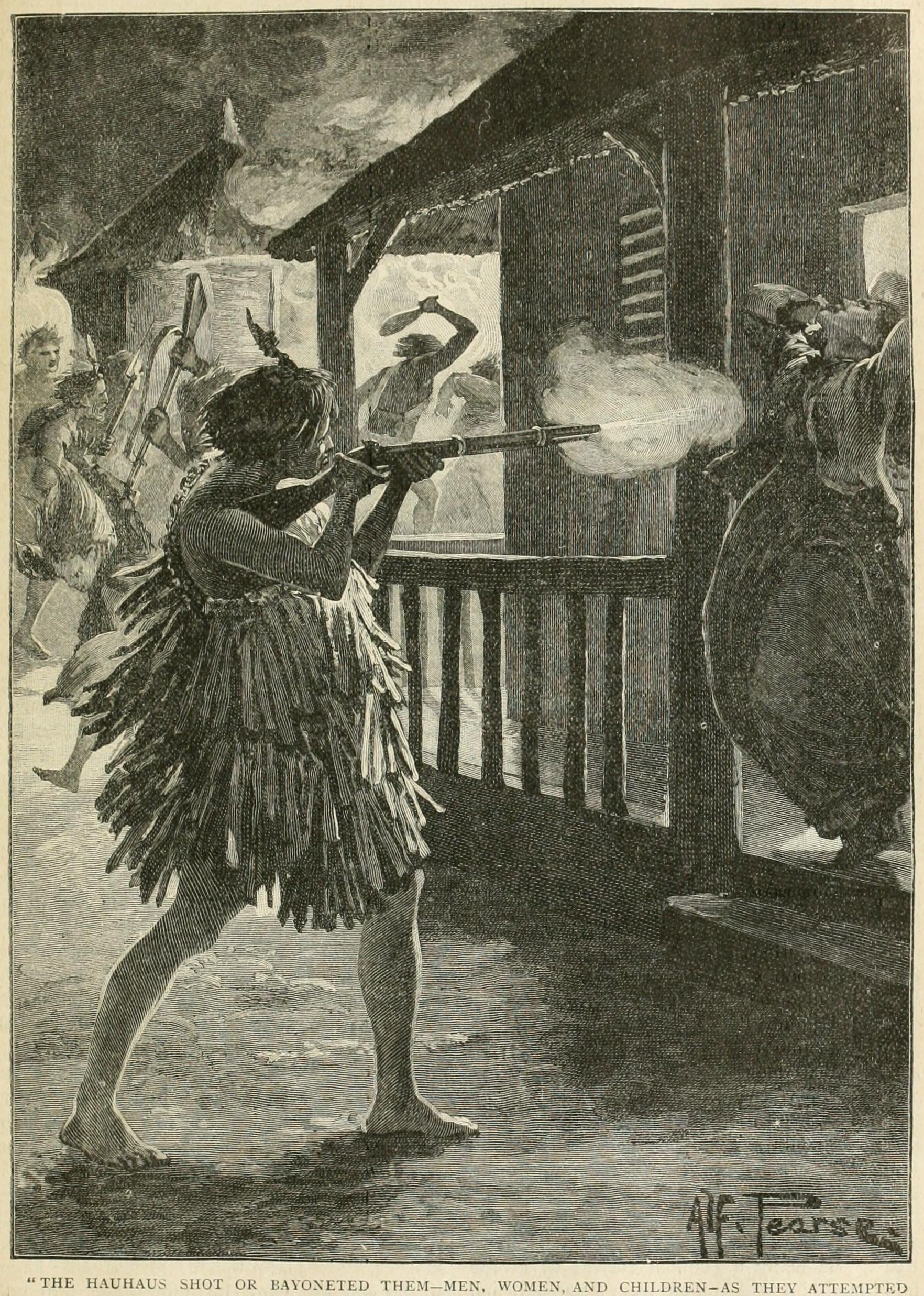
Poverty Bay Massacre (Battles of the nineteenth century, no. 3, 1901). Artist: Alfred Pearse

Te Kooti in the meantime had reached Pātūtahi, a village in the western hills overlooking Poverty Bay. Tūranga, on the mouth of the Waimata River, and nearby Matawhero, was home to about 150 European settlers and 500 Māori. Many of the men responsible for Te Kooti's exile to the Chatham Islands lived in the area. From Pātūtahi, on the night of 9 November, Te Kooti led a 100-strong kōkiri (attack party) into Poverty Bay. The kōkiri was split into several smaller contingents and struck several properties in the area. The party led by Te Kooti surrounded Biggs' home at Matawhero where he, his wife, their baby and servants were fatally shot, clubbed and bayoneted. Another party, led by Nama, attacked the family of Captain James Wilson, killing him, a servant and three of his four children and fatally wounding his wife. The attackers moved on to other homes, slaughtering the families of other settlers who had fought with the militia forces and setting fire to their houses. Many of the killings were followed by the singing of Psalm 63, which concluded: "They who seek my life will be destroyed ... they will be given over to the sword and become food for jackals." Around 30 settlers, mostly younger men in the militia, were killed as well as 37 Māori.

The survivors fled to the safety of the redoubt at Tūranga. The next day, Lieutenant Frederick Gascoyne of the Colonial Defence Force, who was one of the scouts watching the southern routes to Wairoa, took command at the redoubt having seen Te Kooti's men pillaging Matawhero when making his way to the town. This left Te Kooti in control of the area. He remained in the district until 17 November, collecting supplies and taking around 300 Māori prisoners of which between 20 and 40 were executed. He also had a local rangatira, Paratene Pototi, who had played a role in Te Kooti being sent to the Chathams, murdered along with six other rangatira. He then marched his followers and remaining prisoners inland to Makaretu, about 48 kilometres (30 mi) from Tūranga. The position was not favourable; a flat area next to the Wharekōpae River.

As a result of the massacre, the government were now determined to deal with Te Kooti, placing a bounty for his capture and bringing back Whitmore's Armed Constabulary to the region. A party of 200 Ngāti Kahungunu from Napier had arrived at Tūranga and along with 140 warriors already there, departed with Gascoyne in pursuit of Te Kooti. They were joined by 100 Ngāti Rongowhakaata and a small contingent of Armed Constabulary. They headed inland to cut off Te Kooti's passage to the Urewera Ranges; on 20 November two of his men were spotted and killed near Pātūtahi and the tracks of the rest were picked up. The chasing kūpapa reached Makaretu on 23 November and having more than double the number of Te Kooti's men they promptly attacked across the flat area, which Te Kooti met with his warriors. The kūpapa were fended off and in doing so, one of the leaders of the Ngāti Kahungunu, Hamuora Tairoa, was killed. They dug in on a ridge about 1.6 kilometres (0.99 mi) from Makaretu and waited for supplies of ammunition to be brought forward. However, Te Kooti sent a small raiding party to attack the depot that was the expected source of the supplies of ammunition and this proved successful. They routed the small garrison at the depot and plundered 16,000 rounds of ammunition for Te Kooti's forces.

On 3 December, 180 Ngāti Porou fighters led by Ropata Wahawaha and Hotene Porourangi arrived. The Ngāti Porou were allied to the government and keen to enhance their interests by helping deal with the threat presented by Te Kooti. The kūpapa, now numbering 700, promptly attacked with the Ngāti Porou at the centre of the assault. However most of Te Kooti's force had already escaped out the back of Makaretu, leaving behind a rearguard, most of whom were killed. Among the dead was Nama. Two prisoners were taken and Ropata ordered them to be executed. The leader of the Napier contingent of Ngāti Kahungunu, Tāreha Te Moananui, refused to allow it and withdrew his 250 men from the pursuit. Te Kooti in the meantime had moved with his followers to Ngātapa pā, 3 miles (4.8 km) away.

== Siege of Ngātapa ==
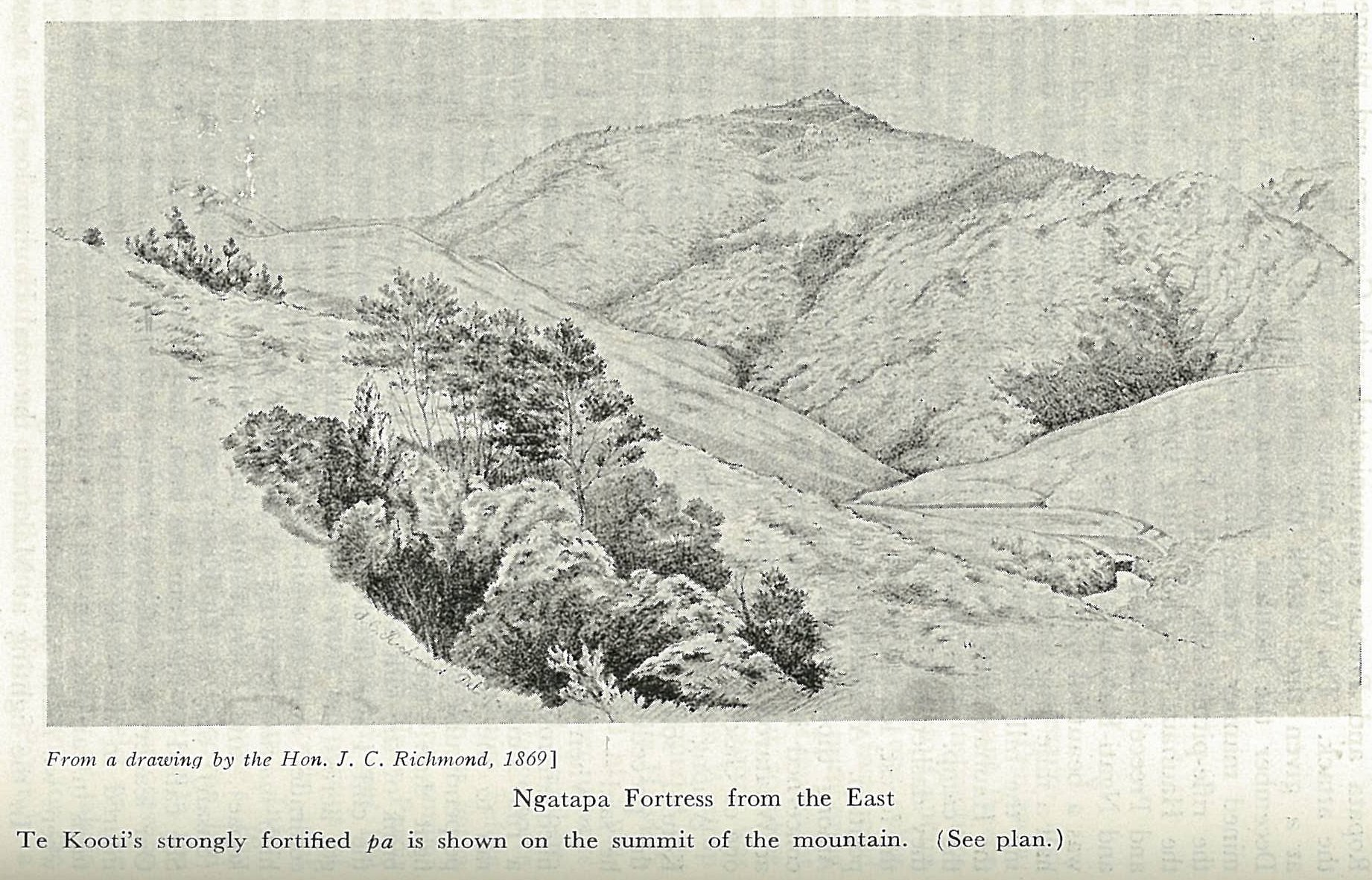
Ngātapa pā, on the summit of the hill, scene of a four-day siege in January 1869

Ngātapa was a formidable pā, standing 700 metres (2,300 ft) above sea level and surrounded by cliffs on three sides and dense bush on the side facing any opposing force. Te Kooti had hastily begun strengthening its defences with earthworks. On 4 December Ropata, with as few as 150 men, gained some ground in a rush on the pā, but was forced to abandon the assault a day later and return to Tūranga, short of gunpowder and men.

Desperate for arms and ammunition, Te Kooti led a second lightning raid on Tūranga on 12 December, killing some locals but failing to secure the supplies they needed. The raid galvanised Whitmore, who had arrived at Tūranga with his Armed Constabulary the previous week, to renew his campaign against Te Kooti, which he had decided just two days earlier to abandon after false reports that Te Kooti had quit Ngātapa and retired inland. He amassed a 600-man force—250 Europeans in the Armed Constabulary, 60 Te Arawa led by European officers and over 300 Ngāti Porou led by Ropata and Hotene Porourangi—at Ngātapa on 31 December and launched the attack the following day, quickly encircling the pā and its 500 occupants, and cutting off their water supply. A high rocky precipice on the north side of Ngātapa, considered far too steep for use as an escape route, was left unguarded. Heavy rain fell as the siege continued and Te Kooti abandoned his outer defences in the early hours of 5 January 1869 after Te Arawa and Ngāti Porou fighters climbed the rock face and kept up heavy fire, while others in Whitmore's force provided covering fire.

Alerted by a woman's cry later that there were no men left in the pā, the kūpapa entered to find mostly several women and children, most of them Te Kooti's prisoners, plus some wounded warriors; the latter were promptly killed. At least 190 occupants of Ngātapa had descended from the unguarded steep rock outcrop, lowering themselves more than 20 metres (66 ft) down the almost perpendicular face on vines woven to form a rope or ladder. Ngāti Porou set off in immediate pursuit and flushed out 130 male prisoners from the bush and gorges below. They were marched up the hill to the pā and executed. Around 135 women and children were spared execution, with most taken by Ngāti Porou as their own prisoners. About 20 male prisoners were kept to be put on trial.

The government losses were 11 men killed; five Armed Constabulary and six Ngāti Porou. Te Kooti's losses were far higher; having already lost 60 or so of his Ringatū warriors killed or taken prisoner at Makaretu, another 130, around half of his total fighting force, were killed at Ngātapa or executed in the aftermath of the siege when they were pursued through the bush following their escape from the pā. However, at least some of the executed were likely to have been Māori captured by Te Kooti in his raids in Poverty Bay rather than Ringatū.

== Retreat to the wilderness ==
Contrary to the expectation of their pursuers, who believed that Te Kooti and his remaining Ringatū followers would attempt to return to Puketapu, they retreated to the northeast to the outskirts of the Urewera mountains. Basing themselves at Maraetahi, near Oponae, about 40 kilometres (25 mi) south of Ōpōtiki in the Waioeka gorge, from January through to March, he had a dialogue with Tūhoe leaders who, stung by recent confiscations of their tribal land near Ōhiwa, debated amongst themselves whether to support Te Kooti. On 2 March, he came to an agreement to defend the Urewera with Tūhoe support. In the meantime, his ranks soon expanded with warriors, mainly from Tūhoe but also other iwi in the surrounding areas, and he had amassed a fighting force of around 130 men.

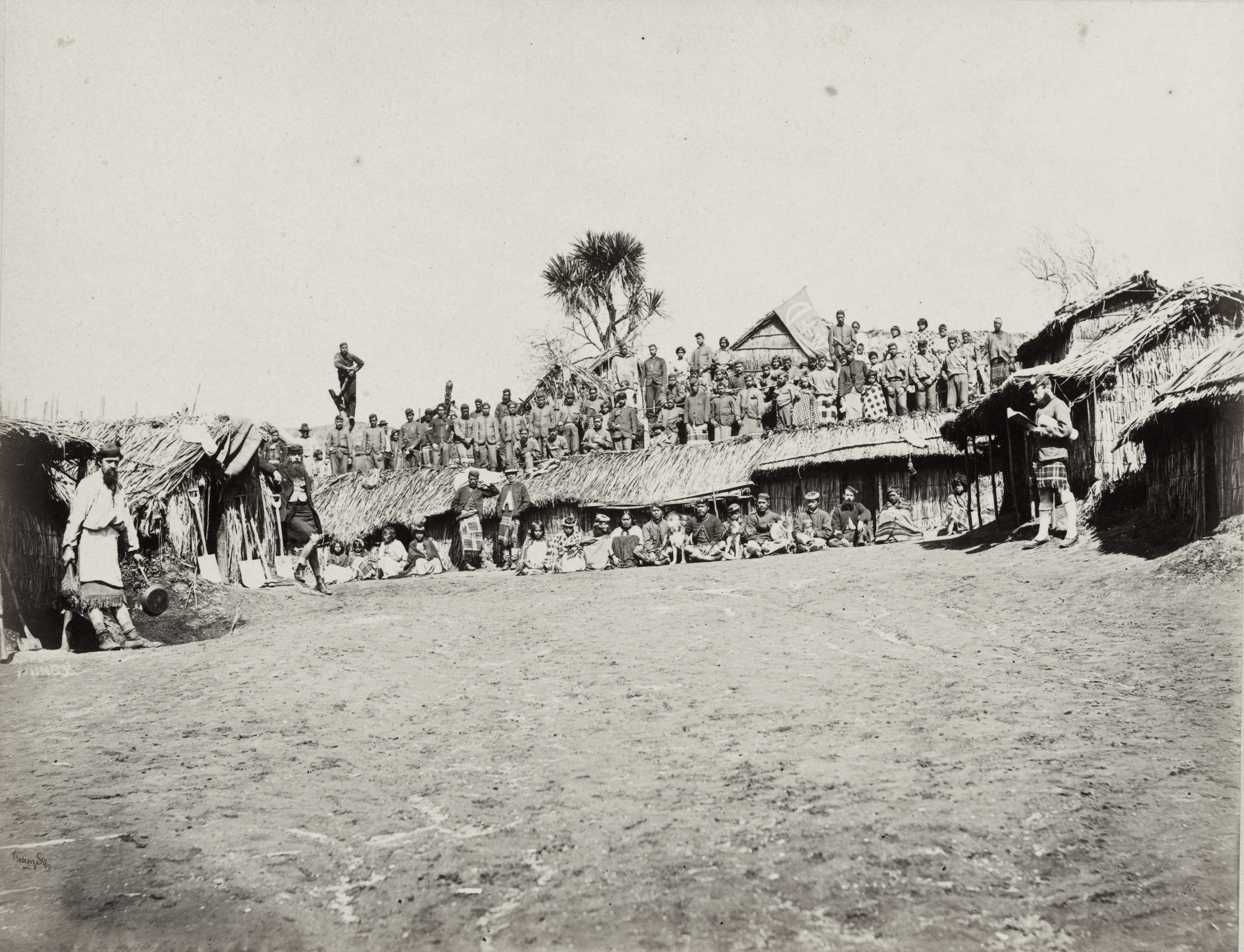
The Arawa fighting contingent, Rotokakahi (Green Lake), Aotearoa-New Zealand, 1870

Te Kooti went on the offensive a few days later, seeking to acquire weapons, ammunition and other supplies by raiding the area around Ōhiwa Harbour and Whakatāne. He marched to the pā at Whakarae, under the control of Rakuraku, a Tūhoe rangatira, to the immediate south of Ōhiwa Harbour and quickly gained its possession. He stayed for a few days, recruiting warriors and also ordering a surveyor, Robert Pitcairn, working nearby at Ōhiwa, be killed. He then moved west and besieged a Ngāti Pūkeko pā, Rauporoa, on the west bank of the Whakatāne River. A Frenchman, Jean Guerren, who ran the local mill, was killed during the fighting at the pā; it was taken on 11 March and Te Kooti ordered Guerren's wife, a Māori, be executed by her sister. Whakatāne itself was looted by one of Te Kooti's detachments.

Before Rauporoa fell, messengers had been dispatched to Ōpōtiki seeking assistance. There, Major William Mair of the Armed Constabulary gathered a party of around 160 men but by the time they arrived at Rauporoa in the afternoon of 11 March, it had been abandoned. Te Kooti's men could be seen in the distance, but Mair declined to pursue as his forces appeared outnumbered; he estimated that the Ringatū numbered around 250 to 300 warriors. At the same, a party led by Gilbert Mair, William's brother, who had raised a force of 130 Te Arawa on his way to the area from Tauranga where he had heard of the events of Rauporoa, came across mounted Ringatū pursuing Ngāti Pūkeko who had fled Rauporoa. The Ringatū rejoined the rest of Te Kooti's men and then turned and made to attack William Mair's Ōpōtiki party, which then withdrew to Whakatāne. On 13 March he was joined there by Gilbert Mair and another Mair brother, Henry and waited for reinforcements.

On 15 March, the Mairs led a party of 450, mostly kūpapa of Te Arawa, in pursuit of Te Kooti, who in the meantime had attacked a pā at Pāharakeke on the Rangitaiki River. About 40 Ngāti Awa were coerced, forcibly or otherwise, to joining his Ringatū. The Mairs followed along the Rangitaiki and at dusk the next day caught up with Te Kooti at Tauaroa pā. A cordon was thrown around the pā but some of the kūpapa refused to move in the dark so the encirclement was incomplete. Te Kooti and his followers slipped out during the night and retreated into the Urewera. When the Mairs entered the next morning on realising the pā was empty, they found the body of a young Te Arawa warrior who had been tortured and killed.

The following month, on 10 April, Te Kooti launched another surprise strike, this time on Mohaka, south of Wairoa. Mohaka was a village of Ngāti Pāhauwera, a hāpu of Ngāti Kahungunu, and was well supplied with ammunition, the securing of which was Te Kooti's objective. His 150-strong force swept through Mohaka, killing many men, women and children and some nearby colonists before moving to their primary targets, Te Huki pā and the bigger Hiruharama pā on the coast. Te Huki was besieged overnight before being taken the next morning when Te Kooti proposed peace under a white flag. Once access to the pā was gained, its 26 occupants were killed. The raid netted Te Kooti enough ammunition to assault Hiruharama, but an attempted siege of the bigger pā collapsed when outside reinforcements led by Īhaka Whaanga of Ngāti Kahungunu arrived to help the defenders. Once again Te Kooti retreated to the Tūhoe heartland, the attack having killed 65 locals, mostly Māori.

Te Kooti's latest series of raids saw his numbers increase and he gained significant amount of supplies, although little ammunition. It also prompted the evacuation to Auckland of most European women and children in the Bay of Plenty. Urged by Henry Clarke, in charge of Native Affairs at Tauranga, the government instructed Whitmore to mount an invasion of the Urewera to deny Te Kooti a base for operations into the Bay of Plenty and the East Cape. By now, Te Kooti's attacks on the Māori population in the East Cape area had pushed the various affected iwi towards alignment with the government in taking action against him.

== Invasion of the Urewera ==
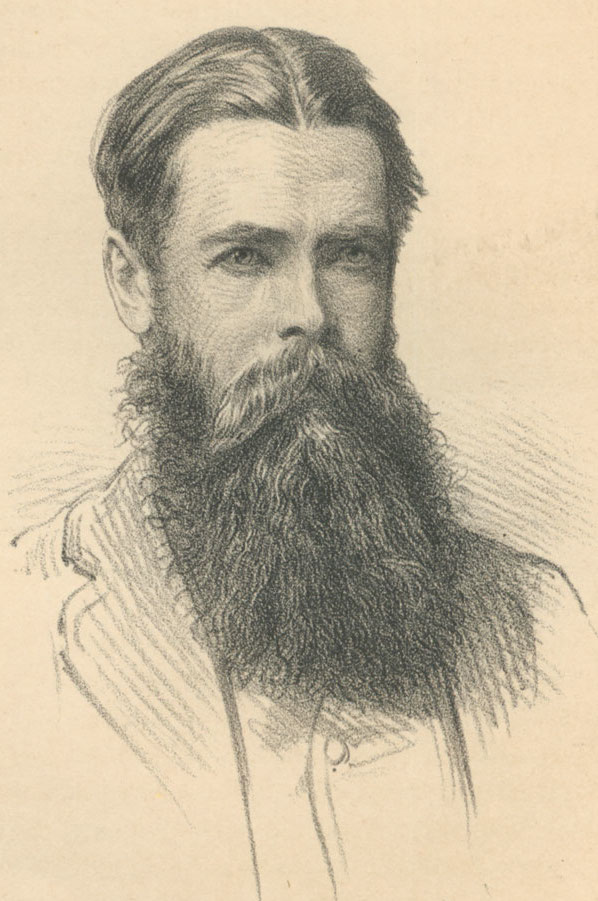
Colonel George Whitmore

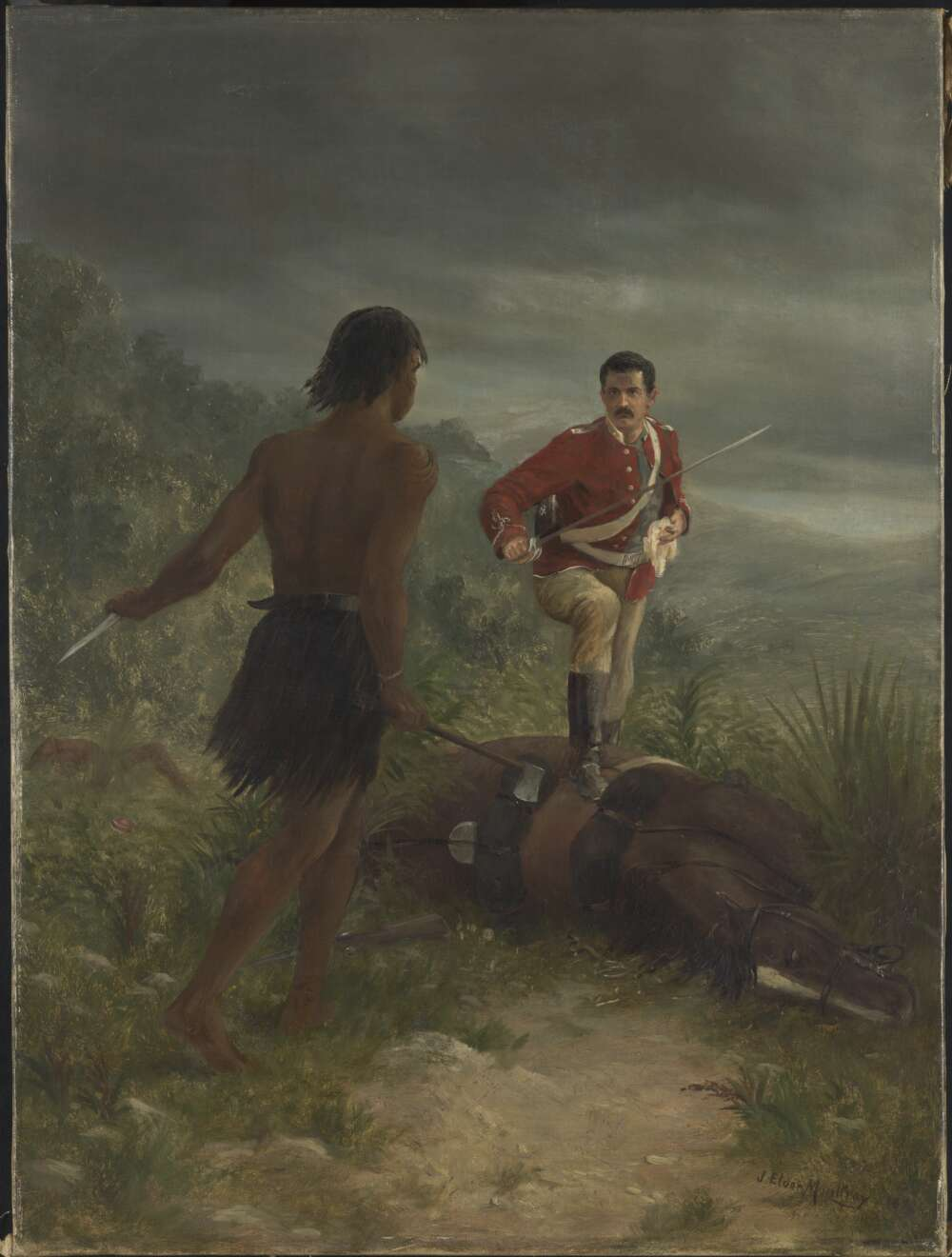
John Moultray's A Trooper of the Wanganui Cavalry Attacked by a Hau-Hau, an oil on canvas executed in 1892

News of the March raids near Whakatāne had already reached Whitmore in Taranaki, who by then was abandoning his pursuit of Tītokowaru. Whitmore and Native Affairs Minister James Richmond resolved to shift the main colonial force to the east coast and by 20 April Whitmore and 600 Armed Constabulary were in Ōpōtiki, preparing for the formidable task of invading the Urewera mountains with the twin aims of capturing Te Kooti and destroying all Tūhoe settlements, and thereby their ability to shelter him.

Whitmore planned an invasion using three separate columns, all targeting Ruatāhuna, the expected centre of resistance. The first column was to start from Wairoa in the south and cross Lake Waikaremoana; this force was led by Lieutenant Colonel J. L. Herrick. The second, under Lieutenant-Colonel St John, was from Ōpōtiki in the north, pushing up the Whakatāne River. The third was led by Whitmore and this would move up the Rangitaiki River and enter the Urewera from the west. The invasion force outnumbered the total population of the Urewera and involved about 1300 troops: 620 constabulary, 95 militia and 500 kūpapa, evenly divided between the three lines of advance.

The first action involved Whitmore's column attacking Te Harema pā at Te Whaiti around noon on 6 May. Six defenders were killed and 50 prisoners, most of them women and children, were taken. The former were given to the Arawa contingent while the pā was looted and later burned. Whitmore continued on to Ruatāhuna, rendezvousing with St John's column on 7 May; the latter had attacked a kāinga at Omaruoteane, killing three men. The two commanders spent the next few days systematically destroying all settlements, crops and livestock in Ruatāhuna in an attempt to drive the Tūhoe people to starvation. The mission faltered on 12 May when, after a brief clash with Te Kooti's advance guard, the Arawa fighters refused to advance beyond Ruatāhuna. Some of the government forces, including Whitmore, were afflicted with dysentery by this time and Whitmore's men withdrew from the Urewera within a week. As justification, they blamed the caution of the Arawa. Herrick's expedition meanwhile pushed on, finally reaching Onepoto, at Lake Waikaremoana's south, on 24 May, and labored at building boats to cross to the north side of the lake to where Te Kooti was sheltering. This venture continued until 8 July when Herrick, advised of Te Kooti's departure from the Urewera, scuttled his boats (Note: Two clinker whaleboats were built and subsequently scuttled. One was later recovered but the other remains in the lake.) and returned south. The cost of the expedition, some £40,000 to £60,000, was an embarrassment to the government although Whitmore would subsequently claim it was a success. His scorched earth strategy had achieved its aim; in late May Tūhoe chiefs turned on Te Kooti and demanded he leave their territory and early the following month he left for Taupō.

Te Kooti and his party, about 150 warriors and some women, headed for Taupō. On the way he launched a raid on an encampment of militia cavalry from the Bay of Plenty at Opepe, about 15 miles (24 km) from Lake Taupō, on 7 June. The militia were an escort party for Colonel St. John, who was scouting potential positions for forts and had gone on ahead. The militia at Opepe were expecting to be joined by some kūpapa and took Te Kooti's vanguard to be who they were waiting for. Once Te Kooti's men entered the encampment they killed nine militia while five others escaped. Te Kooti gained all their arms and supplies.

He destroyed the pā of two hapu who had earlier refused to give him refuge or assistance, then arrived on 10 June at Tauranga, at the southern end of Lake Taupō, occupying the settlement for more than a week before moving to Moerangi, southwest of the lake, taking more prisoners as he travelled.

Early in July Te Kooti and his followers and prisoners, a group of possibly more than 800, set off for Tokangamutu, the temporary residence of Māori king Tāwhiao near Te Kūiti, where he hoped to either force Tāwhiao into an alliance or topple him.

== Challenge to King Tāwhiao ==
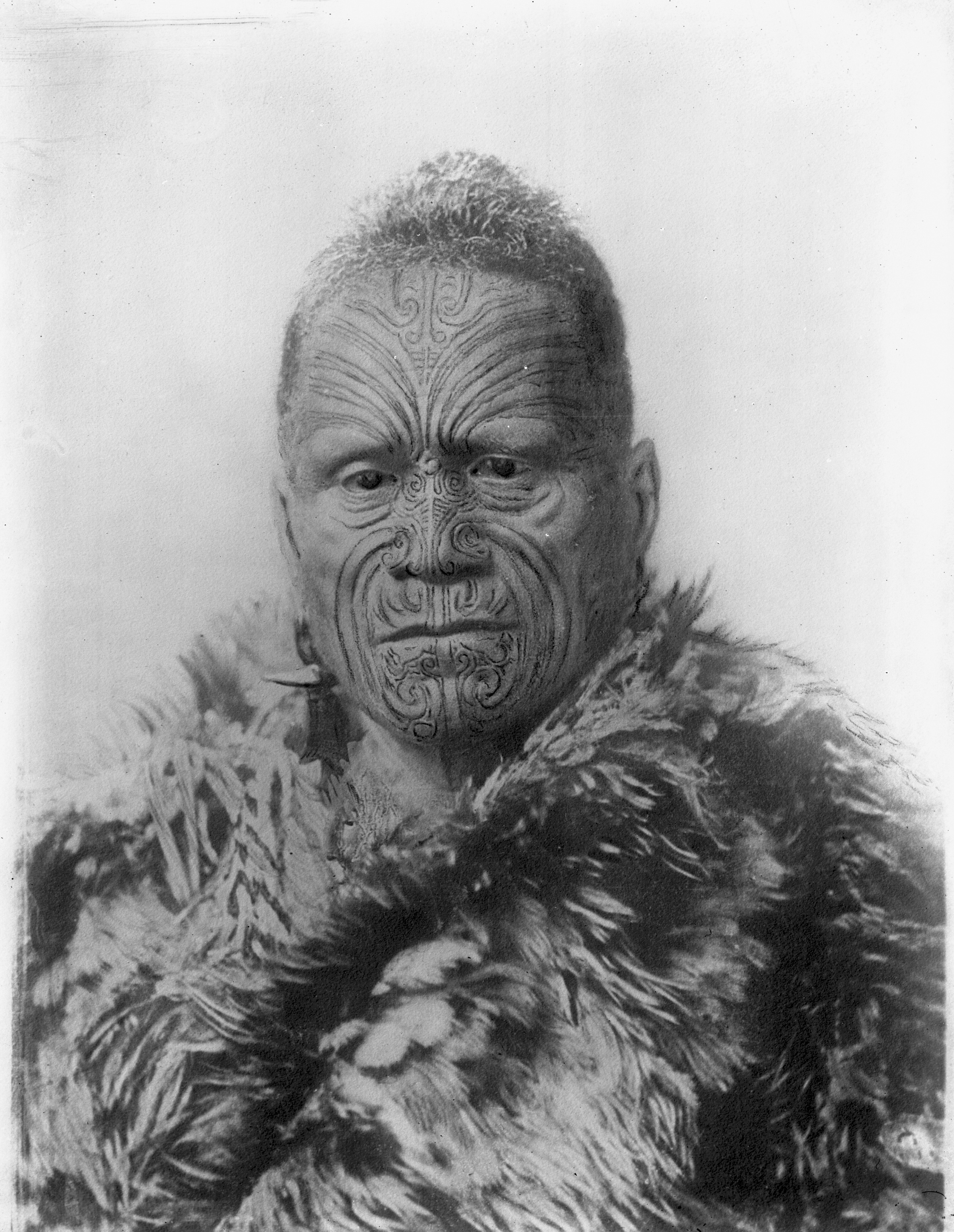
Tāwhiao

A meeting between Te Kooti and Tāwhiao, had it taken place, would have been a confrontation of two prophets and leaders who had taken diametrically opposed positions on further war with the government. While Te Kooti viewed warfare as the means by which his vision of the return of their land would be fulfilled, Tāwhiao had renounced armed conflict and declared 1867–68 as the "year of the lamb" and "year of peace"; in April 1869 he had issued another proclamation that "the slaying of man by man is to cease". Though there were radical elements in the Kīngitanga movement who favoured a resumption of war, including Rewi Maniapoto and possibly Tāwhiao himself, moderates continued to warn the King that the Ringatū had little chance of success. Te Kooti had been angered by Tāwhiao's refusal the previous November to send reinforcements during their campaigns near Tūranga and had then threatened that if he remained aloof he would be cursed by Jehovah, who would command Te Kooti to march to Te Kūiti and put the king and his people to the sword.

Tāmati Ngāpora, a senior adviser to the King, had invited Te Kooti to Te Kūiti, but on the proviso that he came in peace. Te Kooti's response was one of defiance, warning that he was coming to "assume himself the authority which he coming directly from God was entitled to". His chief aim for the visit was simple: to rouse Tāwhiao's support for renewed war against the government and wrest back the confiscated land. Accompanied by Horonuku and about 200 Ngāti Tūwharetoa, he arrived at Te Kūiti on 10 July 1869, immediately declaring that he was the host (tangata whenua) and that the Waikato were his visitors. At an assembly attended by 200 Waikato Māori, Te Kooti urged them to hold the land and keep up the fighting. But though Te Kooti remained there for 15 days, with the village in a heightened state of tension as he continued to challenge the mana of the king, Tāwhiao refused to emerge from his home to meet him. The Kīngitanga movement eventually decided to support Te Kooti, although not in outright hostilities—as well as a place of sanctuary inland on the Mōkau River under the protection of Ngāti Maniapoto.

News of Te Kooti's presence in Te Kūiti, and the prospect of the two Māori leaders forming an alliance, alarmed the government. Premier William Fox said the development heightened "the probability of a combined attack on the settled districts in the neighbourhood of Auckland" and both Houses of Parliament accepted government motions asking Major-General Sir Trevor Chute, commander of the British forces in New Zealand, to cancel orders for a planned withdrawal of the 18th Regiment, the sole remaining British regiment in New Zealand. Yet Binney has speculated that history could well have turned had Tāwhiao decided to join Te Kooti's campaign. In official correspondence between Auckland and London in 1869, Governor George Bowen advocated granting "a separate principality" for Tāwhiao as a means of attaining peace, while the British government similarly urged the colonial government to "cede the lands conquered by the Queen's troops" and surrender "the Queen's sovereignty" in those areas, while recognising "absolute dominion" by the King within his borders. Premier Fox, who was desperately trying to cut military expenditure, strongly opposed proposals for Māori self-government under the Māori king, as urged by Bowen and former Chief Justice Sir William Martin, but the formation of a more robust pan-Māori alliance could have become a tipping point to create a system of separate Māori rule in their territory.

== Taupō campaign and defeat at Te Pōrere ==
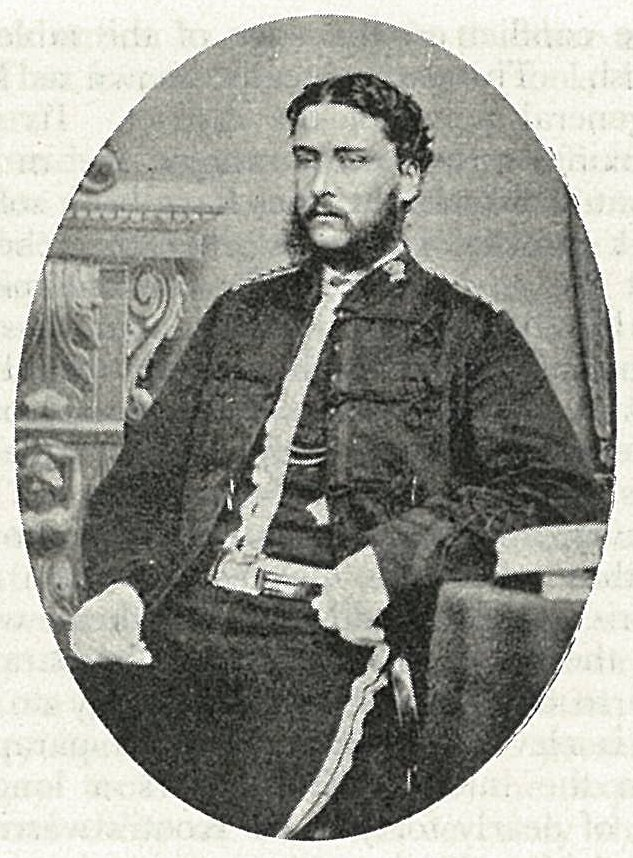
Captain John St George of the Hawkes Bay squadron of the Colonial Defence Force, who was killed during the storming of Te Pōrere.

Accompanied by Rewi Maniapoto, Te Kooti and his followers left Te Kūiti and returned to Taupō, settling briefly at its southern end on 18 August before launching a Taupō campaign that took him to the brink of defeat. News of his return prompted the formation near Taupō of a 700-strong government force, with all but about 100 of them kūpapa: Ngāti Kahungunu (230 men), Wanganui (160), Ngāti Tūwharetoa (130) and Arawa (50). On 10 September 1869 Te Kooti's force of about 280 mounted a pre-emptive strike against a 120-man mounted Ngāti Kahungunu contingent, led by Henare Tomoana, which was camped at Tauranga-Taupō. But although Te Kooti took their horses and much of their equipment, he was forced to retreat under heavy fire. Three of his force were killed and several wounded. They then retreated to Moerangi, inside the relative security of the Rohe Pōtae or King's territory—an area the government considered too dangerous to attack, for fear of reviving Kīngitanga aggression. At this point Rewi separated from Te Kooti and returned to the Waikato, unimpressed by Te Kooti's performance in battle and angered by the slaughter at Rotoaira on 7 September of four Māori scouts with Waikato connections. Any chance of a compact between Te Kooti and the Kīngitanga had now vanished.

Less than two weeks later, on the morning of 25 September, Te Kooti returned to Tokaanu with 250 to 300 fighters for what eventuated as a disastrous attack. After striking from the densely forested hills of Te Ponanga saddle south of Tokaanu, they were driven back by a joint force of Henare Tomoana's Ngāti Kahungunu and Hohepa Tamamutu's Tūwharetoa. Te Kooti dug in at nearby Te Ponanga, but lost seven in battle, including Wi Piro, a close relative who had been prominent in all the Ringatū raids. The heads of his wounded warriors were severed by members of the government force.

But the most ignominious defeat was to come. Amid sleet, snow and driving winds, Te Kooti began preparing an earthwork redoubt at Te Pōrere near Papakai village, about 9 km west of Lake Rotoaira on the lower northwest slopes of Mount Tongariro. The redoubt was built in the form of a European fortification, about 20 metres square, with 3 metre-high walls built of sod and pumice, bound with layers of fern. The structure was designed for a fixed battle, a style of conflict that Te Kooti had previously avoided. Government forces, under the command of Major Thomas McDonnell, arrived at Papakai in the first week of October and launched an assault with 540 men on the morning of 4 October in heavy rain. Ngāti Kahungunu and Arawa forces led by Te Keepa Te Rangihiwinui—better known to Pākehā as Major Kemp—quickly took the outer trenches, then stormed the redoubt, discovering a fatal design flaw hindered the ability of those inside to effectively maintain fire on an attack force: the loopholes in the parapets had been built without allowing warriors to depress their gun barrels and aim at targets below. As the fight raged, Captain John St George—who had fought since 1865 against Pai Mārire and Ringatū forces—was killed while leading his force on a charge, and a bullet struck Te Kooti in the hand and severed a finger. It was his third injury in battle, after sustaining an ankle injury at Puketapu and a shoulder wound at Ngātapa. In what turned out to be the last major battle of the New Zealand Wars, between 37 and 52 of Te Kooti's force were killed—a sixth of his fighting force—and more than 20 women and children taken prisoner at Te Pōrere. The government loss was four killed and four wounded. Within days Horonuku, who had been sheltering in the bush after escaping, surrendered. Belich noted: "Te Porere was Te Kooti's last stand in a prepared position, and his last attempt at anything other than raid, ambush and the evasion of pursuit."

== Flight and pursuit ==
Te Kooti and his followers—men, women and children—separated and scattered after the Te Pōrere defeat, many of them finding shelter in bushland in the upper Whanganui River. On 9 November Defence Minister Donald McLean met Rewi Maniapoto, Tāmati Ngāpora and other Kīngitanga chiefs, demanding that they surrender Te Kooti. Rewi refused, declaring that he would provide a sanctuary for Te Kooti within the Rohe Pōtae as long as he remained peaceful, but would hand him over if he caused trouble. But at a hui of upper Whanganui chiefs 10 days later, influential chief Tōpia Tūroa declared that in revenge for earlier killings by Te Kooti of several kinsmen and a priest in the Taupō district, he would start his own search for the Ringatū leader from the east, while Te Keepa (Major Kemp) would comb the forest from Taupō in the west. Tōpia's campaign against Te Kooti and his 30 immediate followers gained the approval of Tāwhiao, who now reversed his oath to sheath the sword, and the Whanganui chief sent out almost 400 scouts in search of his quarry.

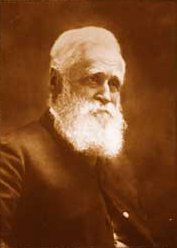
Premier William Fox

At the end of December 1869 to the first week of January 1870 both Te Keepa and Tōpia and their combined force of 600 came close to capturing Te Kooti—again with a fighting force of about 90 and 200 women and children—in the upper Whanganui River near Taumarunui but were thwarted by floodwaters. On 16 January he reappeared at Tapapa, in the Waikato district, and arranged a meeting with Matamata settler and runholder Josiah Firth a day later. He sought Firth's help in achieving a truce with the government. He told him he would not surrender to the authorities, but said: "I am weary of fighting, and desire to live quietly at Tapapa. If I am let alone I will never fight more, and will not hurt man, woman or child."

Firth passed the message to Daniel Pollen, the government's agent for Auckland province, who promised that no military movement would occur while the two negotiated. But when Pollen returned to Auckland to pass on Te Kooti's proposal, he was rebuked by Fox, who ordered the agent to cease interfering in the military campaign. Fox wrote to Pollen that Te Kooti was "a midnight murderer of defenceless women and helpless children ... a man of atrocious cruelty and outrage" who was "repudiated and abhorred by the bulk of his people".

Fox continued preparations for a large-scale confrontation and within days substantial forces were closing in on Tapapa: McDonnell and 250 men approached from Tokaanu up the eastern side of Lake Taupō; Te Keepa, Tōpia and 370 Wanganui moved up the west side; Lieutenant-Colonel William Moule and 135 constabulary and militia came south from Cambridge and Lieutenant-Colonel James Fraser with 90 constabulary and 150 Arawa moved to block Te Kooti's retreat to the Urewera. Another 210 Arawa were also on the march to join McDonnell. Against those 1200 men, Te Kooti may have had as few as 100 men. Te Kooti slipped out of Tapapa as the force arrived, and on 24 January the government forces seized and burned the deserted village. Early the next morning Te Kooti launched a surprise raid on the military camp, with each side losing about four men before Te Kooti was driven off. Although Te Keepa managed to recapture about 100 of the horses Te Kooti had been using, the government party lost the trail of the skilled guerrilla fighter.

On 3 February 1870 there was one more skirmish as Te Kooti and 40 warriors, camping in dense bush at Paengaroa as they travelled north towards present-day Te Puke, ambushed a 236-strong force led by Fraser, killing three or four, before vanishing again as they headed south. Four days later they appeared beside Lake Rotorua, where Te Kooti sought a truce directly with Te Mamaku and local Arawa, and asked local Māori for permission for his party—240 men and 100 women—to cross their land towards Ruatāhuna in the Urewera. Gilbert Mair, who arrived soon after with a contingent of Arawa fighters, was angered by the request, which was being considered by local chiefs, and ordered his men to pursue Te Kooti. Following just 3 kilometres (1.9 mi) behind, Mair's force began a 12 kilometres (7.5 mi) chase that turned into a series of running battles, engaging the rearguard of Te Kooti's forces before being halted by an ambush. Two of Te Kooti's two key fighters, Peka Mākarini and Timoti Hakopa died in that engagement and as night fell, Te Kooti and about 200 with him plunged into the bush, moving rapidly southeast through the night beyond Lake Rotokākahi before emerging in the Urewera, and under the protection of the Tūhoe. As a result of the events of 7 February, Te Kooti lost considerable mana as well as at least 11 of his men. Mair was later awarded the New Zealand Cross for his role in these events.

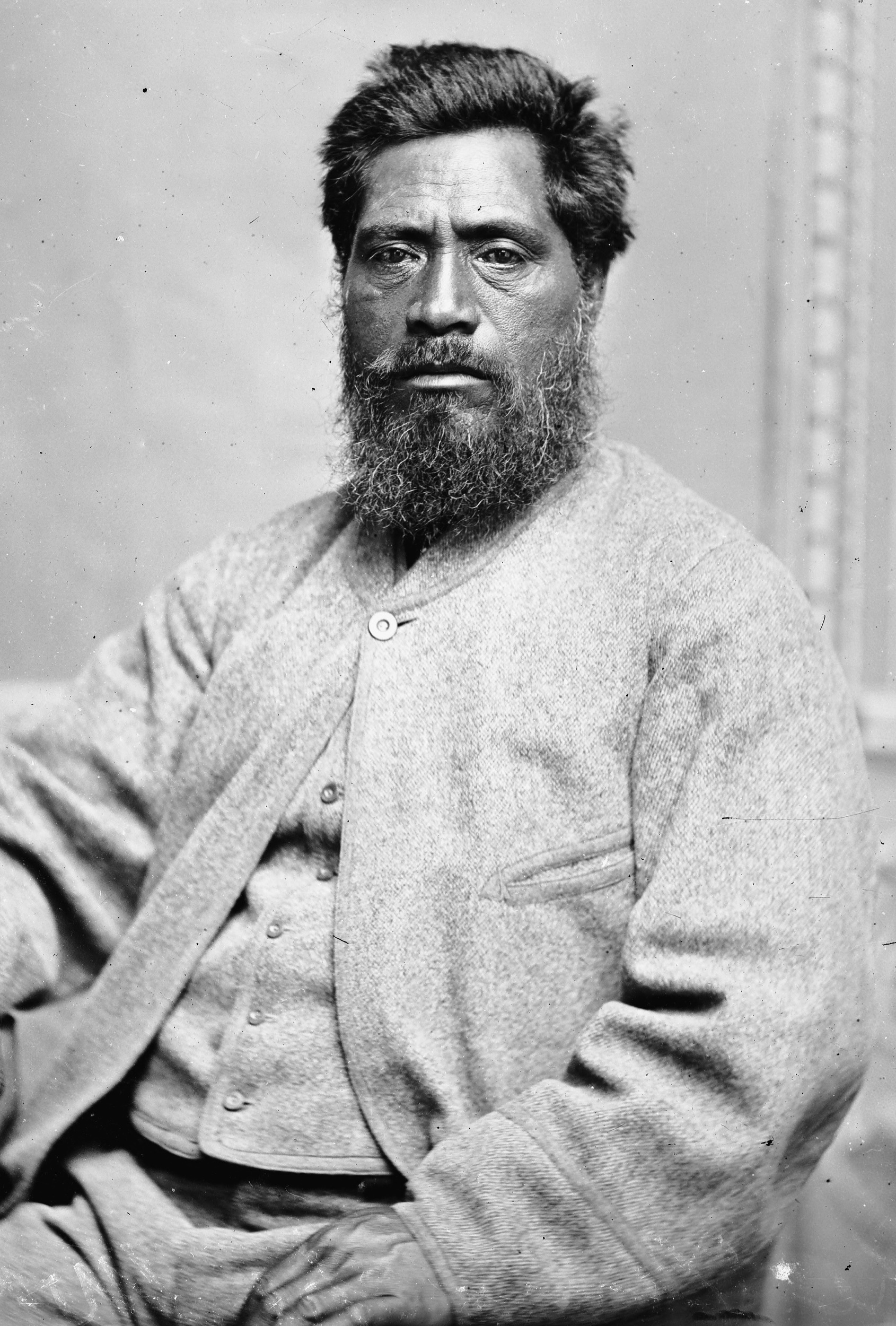
Major Ropata Wahawaha

Within days McDonnell was relieved of his command and McLean, as Native Minister, announced that from 11 February Māori would control all the expeditions into the Urewera, with no European involvement. There would be no daily pay for soldiers; instead they would compete for £5,000 reward offered for Te Kooti's capture. The pursuit was instead led by both Te Keepa with his Whanganui warriors, and Ropata and his Ngāti Porou. Two columns of Te Arawa warriors would also be involved and Mair was to accompany them.

On February 28 Te Kooti struck south of Whakatāne, destroying a mill of an enemy chief, then a week later raided Opape, east of Ōpōtiki, seizing arms and gunpowder and capturing more than 170 men, women and children, intending to hold them ransom to gain more male fighters for his force. He retreated to Maraetahi in the Waioeka gorge, where just over a year earlier he had established a small village, complete with acres of maize and other crops. Te Kooti remained undisturbed there for a month until the arrival on March 25 of forces led by both Ropata—picking their way up the boulder-strewn Waioeka River from the north—and Te Keepa, who was marching down the river from the south. An hour-long firefight erupted before the village and nearby Raipawa pā were taken. About 300 occupants were taken prisoner, all but 87 of them being Whakatōhea prisoners, and about 19 taken captive were executed in the riverbed by tomahawk or gun. Te Kooti managed to flee with about 20 men.

This was the end of the involvement of the Whanganui contingent in the pursuit of Te Kooti. Te Keepa and his men had been on the march for three months. They were operating far from their own territory, fighting on behalf of the Government against an enemy who had never threatened his own people. They felt they had done enough and wanted to go home. McLean arranged their return to Whanganui. He also promised Ngāti Porou the Government would relinquish its claim to land on the East Cape. This incentivised Ropata to raise yet another contingent of Ngāti Porou to pursue Te Kooti.

In July 1871 Ropata and his Ngāti Porou, joined by Mair and Captain George Preece leading a taua (war party) of Arawa, ranged through the Urewera Mountains, subjugating the Tūhoe and forcing them to hand over any fugitives they were sheltering. One welcome catch who fell into Ropata's hands was Kereopa Te Rau, accused of Volkner's murder; he was worth £1,000 to his captors.

On 22 September 1871, Captains Mair and Preece started from Fort Galatea on another Urewera expedition. The Arawa forces unexpectedly came upon Te Kooti's camp, which was taken after a brief skirmish. Wi Heretaunga was captured. He was believed to a participant in the murders of Captain James Wilson and his family at Matawhero in November 1868. He was also accused of being involved in the Mohaka massacre in April 1869. It was decided, that he should be shot, and this summary execution was carried out. When in camp Te Kooti usually slept some distance away from his followers. This habit had saved him at Maraetahi and it did so again. He was almost killed but another man intercepted the bullet. He fired one shot and fled, naked, into the bush, and the hunt continued. At the end of the year, Ropata and his men withdrew from the Urewera and went home, ending the Ngāti Porou pursuit of Te Kooti. Only Te Arawa remained in the field.

On 14 February 1872, Preece and his Te Arawa were at the junction of the Waiau and Mangaone Streams, where they found a camp that had just been occupied by Te Kooti. They then spotted a group of people climbing the cliff on the opposite side of the flooded stream. One of them was Te Kooti. Shots were fired at the party but they missed and Te Kooti and his followers slipped away. These were the last shots fired in the New Zealand Wars.

On 15 May 1872 Te Kooti crossed the Waikato River and once again entered the territory of the Māori king, Tāwhiao. This time he approached the King as supplicant and was granted asylum.

== Pardon and later years ==
In February 1883, the Government formally pardoned Te Kooti as part of a deal with Tāwhiao to put the Main Trunk Line through the King Country. Te Kooti showed his gratitude the following month by rescuing a surveyor, Wilson Hursthouse, who had been taken prisoner, stripped and chained up by disciples of Te Whiti o Rongomai, a prophet from Parihaka.

However Te Kooti remained unrepentant and belligerent. He went about armed with a revolver and threatened to take his gang back to Poverty Bay. He travelled extensively holding meetings to spread the Ringatū message. He was often accompanied by large groups of supporters to places such as Whakatāne and Ōpōtiki. An observer noted 1,000 people gathered to hear him and the resident magistrate commented that for once Te Kooti was sober. Te Kooti was still far from popular with all Māori and was accused by chiefs of practicing mākutu (black magic) to kill senior chiefs who he had previously opposed him.

Chiefs were concerned that groups such as Ngāti Awa and Ngāti Pūkeko would hand over the land to Te Kooti without any authority. The chiefs wrote to parliament to complain that Te Kooti was claiming mana over their land and instructing that the land should not be bought before the Native Land Court. The chiefs were also concerned that the supplies of the communities were being drained by massive hui leading to the people being ill-prepared to face winter. Chiefs complained that Te Kooti was forcing his adherents to raise money for him by selling family crops and animals. School teachers and native officers sent report to the government that this was resulting in children being malnourished. Te Kooti, conscious of his age, decided to return to Poverty Bay. This alarmed the government and the people of Poverty Bay. In February a telegram signed by a number of Ngāti Porou chiefs went to parliament saying they would rise up if Te Kooti did not turn back.

The government was keen to keep the peace. The Minister of Defence was concerned that Te Kooti had been directly threatened by his old adversaries Ropata and the Ngāti Porou. The Prime Minister arranged a meeting in Auckland between himself, Te Kooti and the Native Minister where he was offered government land if he stayed away from Gisborne. Although cordial, Te Kooti told the officials that he was determined to return. As a token of his peaceful intentions he surrendered a small revolver that he normally carried. The government shipped troops and artillery to Gisborne to form a military force of 377 under Major Porter in early 1889. Rumours of threats continued until the force went to Waioeka Pā and found Te Kooti drunk with 4 of his wives and some 400 supporters, who were arrested. He was bound over to keep the peace but as he could not afford the fine or bond he was taken to Mt Eden jail in Auckland where he was persuaded by the Ladies Temperance Movement to take the pledge against drinking alcohol and imprisoned for a short time before being released. Te Kooti wrote a letter of apology to the government explaining that his recent conduct had been caused by drink.

Eventually in 1891 the government gave him an area of land at Wainui, at Ōhiwa Harbour in the Bay of Plenty, where a marae for the Ringatū church was later established. In February 1893 Te Kooti was injured in an accident involving the cart in which he was travelling to Ōhiwa Harbour. Although he resumed his journey he succumbed to his injuries on 17 April 1893. Originally buried at Maromahue, Waiotahe, his followers later removed and hid his remains.

== Aftermath ==
A 2013 Waitangi Tribunal report said the action of Crown forces on the East Coast from 1865 to 1869, during the East Coast Wars and the start of Te Kooti's War, resulted in the deaths of disproportionately more Māori than in any other district during the New Zealand Wars. It condemned the "illegal imprisonment" on the Chatham Islands of a quarter of the East Coast region's adult male population and said the loss in war of an estimated 43 per cent of the male population, many through acts of "lawless brutality", was a stain on New Zealand's history and character.

In May 2013, at the tangi of MP Parekura Horomia, the Tūhoe iwi, who had initially supported Te Kooti and the rebel Hau Hau movement in their 19th century war against the government, gave a gift to Ngāti Porou to end nearly 150 years of bitterness between the tribes. Ngāti Porou had provided many of the soldiers who tracked down the guerilla leader in the late 1860s and had numerous conflicts with Tūhoe Hau Hau. During one conflict 120 Tūhoe Hau Hau were captured and killed. Tūhoe leader Tu Waaka said he did not want successive generations to be encumbered by the events of the past.

== In fiction ==
- Maurice Shadbolt's novel Season of the Jew is set during Te Kooti's War
- The movie Utu is based very loosely around some incidents from Te Kooti's War
- In 1927 a film The Te Kooti Trail was released based on events in Te Kooti's War. It was first banned by the censors office because of 'disturbing realism' but later cleared for release after it was proved the events depicted were based on truth.
