= Gilbert Mair (soldier) =

New Zealand surveyor, interpreter, soldier, public servant (1843–1923)

Gilbert Mair NZC
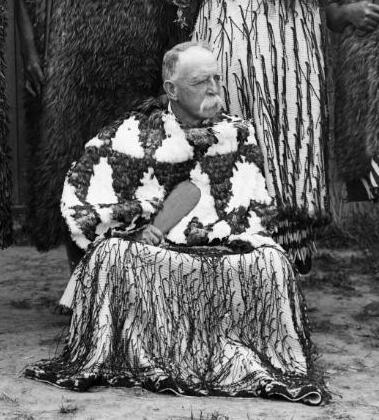
- Mair in 1906 or 1907
- Born: 10 January 1843; Whangārei, Northland, New Zealand
- Died: 29 November 1923 (aged 80); Tauranga, Bay of Plenty, New Zealand
- Burial place: St Faith's Anglican Church Cemetery, Ohinemutu, Bay of Plenty, New Zealand
- Spouse: Kate Sperrey (m. 1888–1893)
- Children: 5, including Kathleen Mair
- Relatives: Gilbert Mair (father); William Gilbert Mair (brother)
- Military career
- Allegiance: British Empire; Colony of New Zealand
- Branch: Colonial Militia; Armed Constabulary
- Service years: 1867–1872
- Rank: Captain
- Commands: The Arawa Flying Column
- Conflicts: New Zealand Wars: Tītokowaru's War; Te Kooti's War
- Awards: New Zealand Cross

Captain Gilbert Mair NZC (10 January 1843 – 29 November 1923) was a New Zealand surveyor, interpreter, soldier, public servant and botanical collector. He was born in Whangārei, Northland, New Zealand on 10 January 1843, the son of an early trader, also named Gilbert Mair. His brother was Major William Gilbert Mair.

== Life ==
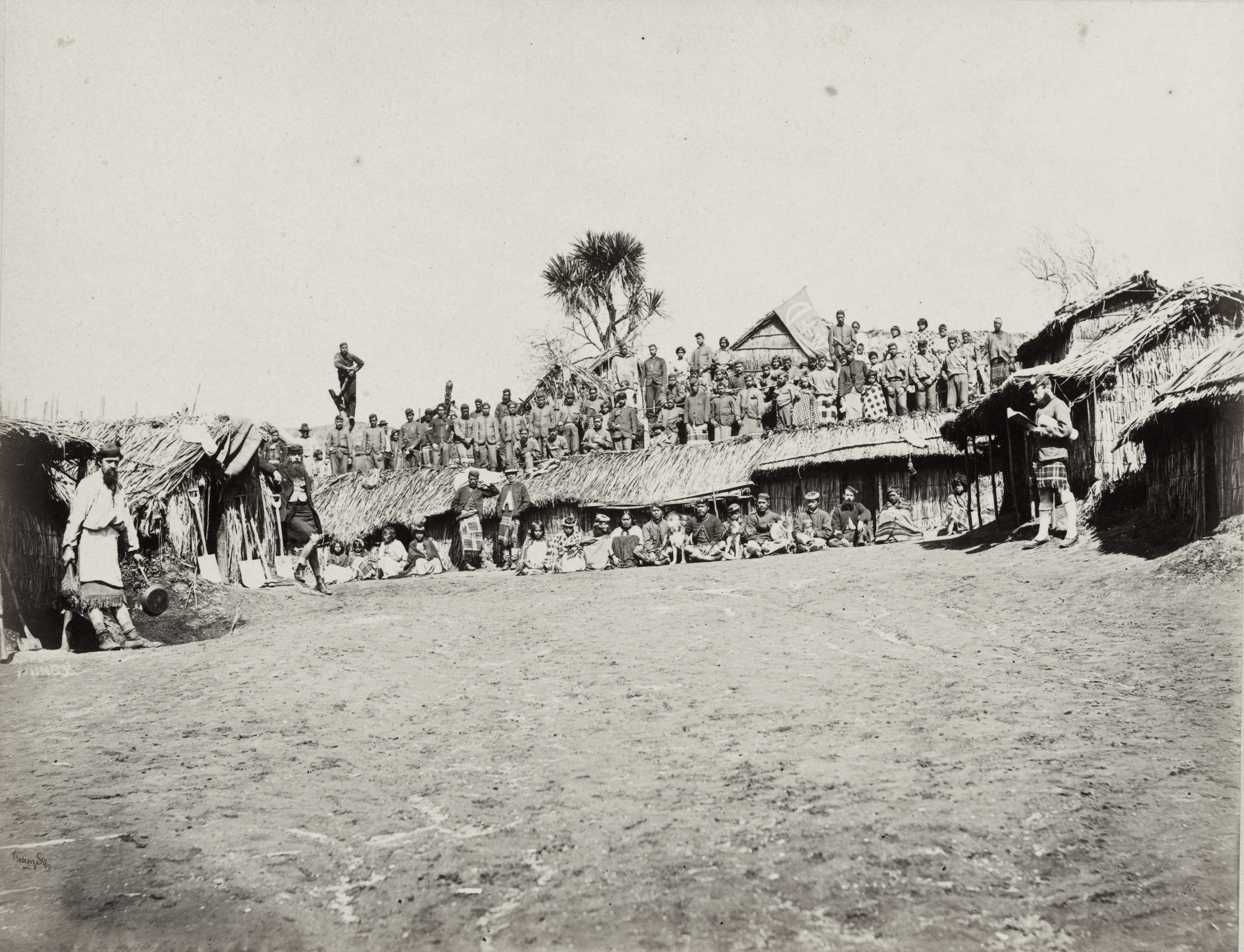
Gilbert Mair and the Arawa fighting contingent, Rotokakahi (Green Lake), Aotearoa-New Zealand, 1870

Raised amongst Maori, he was a fluent Maori speaker. During the attack on Auckland by the Ngāti Maniapoto and the Ngāti Hauā in 1863, Gilbert joined the Forest Rangers under William Jackson, as an ensign or trainee officer. He took part in the Invasion of Waikato against the Kingitanga forces, and became famous in late 1863 for entering into discussions with the rebels during the Battle of Orakau under a flag of truce. The government forces were aware that a number of women and children were in the stronghold and Mair pleaded with the rebels to let them out but they refused and one shot Mair in the shoulder.

Mair later became a lieutenant and led Maori troops during Te Kooti's War between 1868 and 1872 which led to the defeat of Te Kooti's guerillas. Mair was awarded the New Zealand Cross, and a promotion to captain, for his role in an action in February 1870 in which he led a small body of Te Arawa troops and inflicted a significant loss to Te Kooti's forces, killing 20 warriors including two of Te Kooti's key fighters, Peka Makarini (Peka MacLean) and Timoti Hakopa.

In July 1871 Ropata Wahawaha, Tom Porter and Ngati Porou warriors were joined by Mair and Captain George Preece leading a taua (war party) of Arawa. Together they ranged through the Urewera Mountains, subjugating the Tuhoe and forcing them to hand over any fugitives they were sheltering.

On 22 September 1871, Captains Mair and Preece started from Fort Galatea on another Urewera expedition. The Arawa forces unexpectedly came upon Te Kooti's camp, which was taken after a brief skirmish. Wi Heretaunga was captured. He was believed to a participant in the murders of Captain James Wilson and his family at Matawhero in November 1868. He was also accused of being involved in the Mohaka massacre in April 1869. It was decided, that he should be shot, and this summary execution was carried out. When in camp Te Kooti usually slept some distance away from his followers. This habit had saved him at Maraetahi and it did so again. He was almost killed but another man intercepted the bullet. He fired one shot and fled, naked, into the bush, and the hunt continued.

Early in February 1872, Preece received good information, from Ngāi Tūhoe Ringatū, who had been part of Te Kooti's forces, about the whereabouts of Te Kooti, at the junction of the Waiau and Mangaone Streams in the Ureweras. On 13 February they found a camp that had been occupied only a few days previously. The next day they found a camp with a fire still burning and then spotted a group of people climbing the cliff on the opposite side of the flooded stream. One of them was Te Kooti. Shots were exchanged and the chase was on. Later the same day Nikora te Tuhi spotted Te Kooti in the distance and fired two shots at him. They both missed but they were the last shots fired in the New Zealand Wars.

In the 1880s Mair was the government officer trusted with establishing friendly relationships with Rewi Maniapoto in order to facilitate the main trunk railway to enter the King Country. On 19 September 1888, Mair married the artist, Kate Sperrey, in Wellington. The couple had two children, John Gilbert and Kathleen Irene, who became a noted artist under her married name as Airini Vane. Gilbert had previously had three children with the Ngāti Tūwharetoa woman, Keita Kupa.

Gilbert Mair contributed to the Transactions and Proceedings of the Royal Society of New Zealand an Abstract of a Moriori Narrative in 1904. The discussion paper presented the names of all Moriori of the Chatham Islands who were either alive or dead at the time. The document has asterisks beside the names of those who were presumed dead, enslaved or eaten. The paper also has notes on Moriori origins, language, seasons and ritual.

Mair made botanical and other collections, which are housed at Te Papa and Auckland War Memorial Museum. New Zealand botanist Thomas Cheeseman named the species Utricularia mairii (now called U. australis) after him.

Ken Mair is a direct descendant of Col. Gilbert Mair.

== Sources ==
- Crosby, Ron D. (2004). Gilbert Mair: Te Kooti's Nemesis. Auckland: Reed. ISBN 0-7900-0969-2.
- Mair (née Jackson), Lavinia Laura (1935). The Annals of a New Zealand Family: the Household of Gilbert Mair, Early Pioneer. Dunedin: A.H. & A.W. Reed. OCLC 11902982.
- Mair, Gilbert (1904). "ART. V.—The Early History of the Morioris: with an Abstract of a Moriori Narrative". Transactions and Proceedings of the New Zealand Institute. 37. Wellington: John Mackay, Government Printing Office: 156–171.
