= Taonui Hikaka =

Taonui Hikaka (died 2 December 1892) was an Ariki and Rangatira Chief of the Ngāti Maniapoto iwi in New Zealand. He was born in Paripari, King Country, in the early 1840s. After his father Taonui (I) who was one of the 500 chiefs that signed Te Tiriti o Waitangi 1840 died in the 1860s Taonui (II) became the leader of Ngāti Rora, a hapū of Ngati Maniapoto. Along with two older men, Wahanui and Rewi Maniapoto, Taonui was a leading chief of Ngati Maniapoto and represented the tribe in dealings with government bodies.
