= Wahanui =

Wahanui Huatare
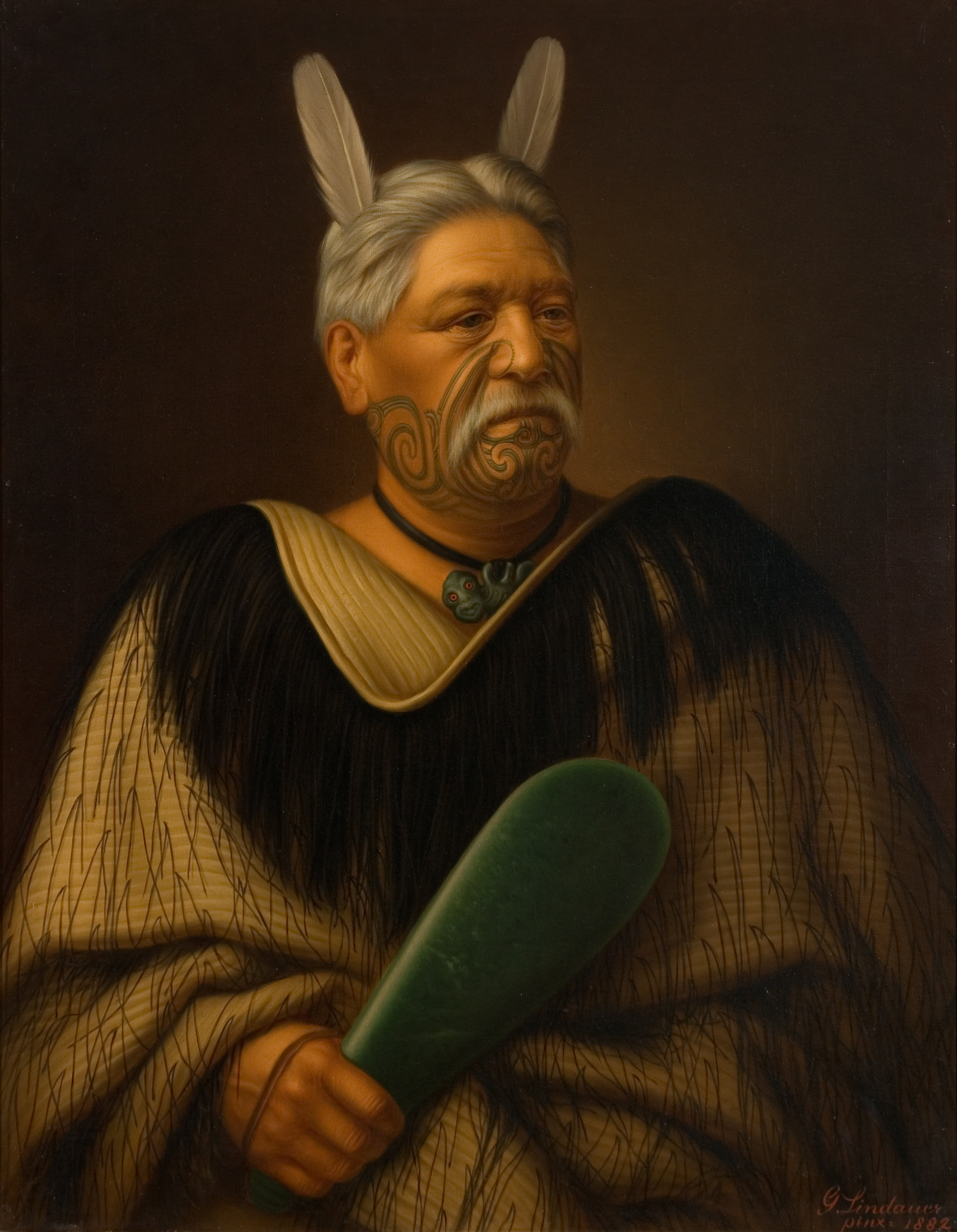
- A portrait of Wahanui Reihana Te Huatare by Gottfried Lindauer, 1882.
- Born: Late 1820s
- Died: 5 December 1897; Whataroa, New Zealand
- Spouse: Te Wairingiringi
- Parents: Te Ngohi-te-arau (father); Tarati (mother)

Te Wahanui Reihana Te Huatare (also Te Reihana Whakahoehoe; died 5 December 1897) was a diplomat and leader of the Ngāti Maniapoto iwi.

Wahanui was born probably in the late 1820s. His father was Te Ngohi-te-arau, also known as Te Huatare, of Ngāti Maniapoto. His mother was Tarati, who belonged to Ngāti Waiora of Mokau and came from the Piopio area. Wahanui was raised in the Waipā Valley as a Christian, and attended the Wesleyan Native Institution at Three Kings College in Auckland, afterwards returning to Te Kopua to live with his people.

In the late 1850s Wahanui organised a mail service between Te Awamutu and Napier, and set up a tribal administration and law enforcement system which attracted the positive attention of John Gorst. He also participated in debates around the setting up of the Māori King Movement.

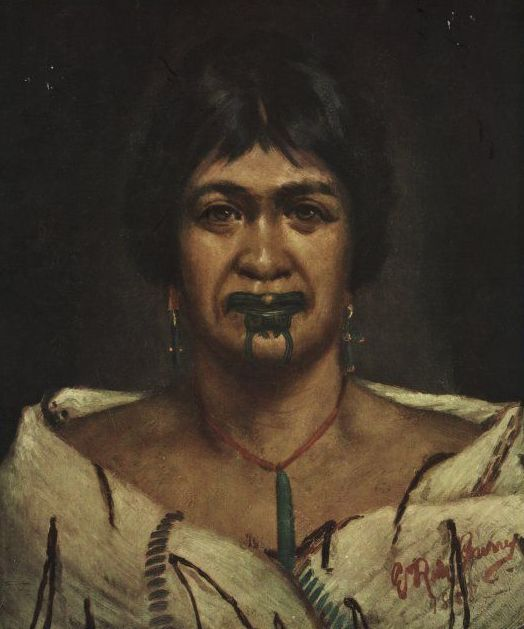
Wahanui's wife, Te Wairingiringi, by Kate Sperrey, 1930s.

Wahanui became increasingly opposed to Pākehā institutions and government, and fought at Pukekohe, Ōrākau, and was wounded at Hairini during February when the colonial government and British forces invaded the Waikato in 1863–64. After the war ended he became an important leader of Ngāti Maniapoto and a principal adviser to the Māori King, Tāwhiao. He was opposed to Ngāti Maniapoto and Waikato selling land, but he and fellow Ngāti Maniapoto leaders Rewi Maniapoto and Taonui eventually realised the inevitability of their territory, the King Country, being opened to Pākehā.

In the early 1880s, he invented the Māori King's Tarahou - a device which signifies the dawn. Wahanui, Rewi and Taonui signed a petition which was presented to Parliament in June 1883; they criticised the government for legislation which ran contrary to the Treaty of Waitangi. In April 1884, Wahanui was approached by Robert Stout who, according to Wahanui, had promised that no hotels would be built, no liquor would be sold, and no land courts would operate in the Ngāti Maniapoto area as long as land would be provided for a new railway that would run between Auckland and Wellington. He was also given a gold medallion which would allow his family free travel via the railway for a few generations, but every promise made by Stout was ignored by the Government. He was later offered a seat in the Legislative Council, but did not take it up.

Wahanui married Te Wairingiringi from Kawhia before May 1884. Their children including Tuwhangai, Hounuku, and Tuaarau were all adopted. One of their grandsons was Te Apaapa Kaweni Maniapoto of Ōtorohanga.
