= Gilbert Mair (trader) =

Gilbert Mair (23 May 1799 – 16 July 1857) was a sailor and a merchant trader who visited New Zealand for the first time when he was twenty, and lived there from 1824 till his death. He married Elizabeth Gilbert Puckey – who had the first piano brought to New Zealand in 1827. They had twelve children. Among them were "famous New Zealanders" like Captain Gilbert Mair and Major William Gilbert Mair. Mair is a direct-line ancestor of Māori politician and activist Ken Mair.

In 1835 Gilbert Mair senior signed the Declaration of Independence of New Zealand as a witness (together with James Clendon) when a number of northern Māori rangatira (chiefs) established themselves as representing a confederation under the title of the "United Tribes of New Zealand". Gilbert Mair senior was "present at the signing of the Treaty of Waitangi in 1840, and he and his family were acquainted with many of the noted men who visited the Bay of Islands".

== Biography ==
Mair, born in Peterhead, Scotland, in 1799, had sailed on the whaling vessel New Zealander in 1820. At this occasion he visited New Zealand for the first time. When it returned to England on 2 March 1820, the missionary Thomas Kendall was among the passengers, together with Hongi Hika and Waikato, the two rangatira of Ngāpuhi iwi (tribe) that were the first Māori to come to England. In 1823 he made his second trip to New Zealand. This time he bought two preserved heads. In 1824 he made his third visit. He would never sail back to England again.

=== Sailing master of the Herald ===
Herald was a 55-ton mission schooner, built at the beach of Paihia in the Bay of Islands. Missionary Henry Williams laid the keel for the vessel in 1824. He needed a ship to provision the mission stations and to visit the more remote areas of New Zealand to bring the Gospel. When Gilbert Mair visited New Zealand for the third time, Williams asked him to assist in building the ship. When the Herald was finished in 1826, Mair became the sailing master.

He made a lot of trips. He went to Australia three times. He visited the Bay of Plenty 4 times, and sailed up and down the east coast of the North Island from the East Cape to the North Cape, and on the west coast south to Kawhia.

In May 1828 the Herald foundered, while trying to enter Hokianga Harbour. After the Herald was wrecked, Gilbert Mair purchased land from the natives, built his home at Wahapu and carried on the business of merchant and trader.

=== Marriage ===
On his first visit to New Zealand, Gilbert Mair had been in contact with the Puckey family: William Puckey and his wife Margery, their son William Gilbert Puckey (1805–1878) and daughter Elizabeth Gilbert (1809–1870). When he had first met Elizabeth she was only 11 or 12, but when he returned in 1824 "she had grown into a 15-year-old woman".

They married on 12 September 1827 in Sydney, during one of trips of the Herald there. They would raise twelve children:

- Caroline Elizabeth, the first born in 1828; she died in 1917
- Robert (1830–1920). His name "is held in high regard at Whangārei, his life-long home town, to whose people he gave a beautiful park"
- William Gilbert Mair (1832–1912), soldier, later a major in the army
- Marianne (1834–1893)
- Henry Abbott (1836–1881)
- Charlotte (1838–1891)
- Jessie Eliza (1840–1899)
- Gilbert (1843–1923): Gilbert Mair junior, or "Te Kooti's Nemesis"
- Matilda Helen (1845–1927). Married Dr Richard Sissons.
- Emily Francis (1848–1902)
- Sophia Marella (1850–1884)
- Lavinia Laura, the last born in 1852; she died in 1936

=== Death ===
Mair died at "Deveron", Whangārei, in 1857. He was buried on his own property. Many years later his sons removed his remains to the graveyard round the Church, where now only members of the Mair family are laid to rest".

== Witness of the Musket Wars ==
During his trips around NZ Gilbert Mair witnessed "the savagery" of the Musket Wars, the wars between Māori iwi (tribes) in the years between 1818 and 1830. He saw for instance the results of a clash at Ohiwa Harbour in 1828, with fifty dead bodies on the shore. And in that same year, he saw the remains of a fight at Te Papa pa at Tauranga Harbour, with "hundreds of bodies of men, women and children, dead animals and human bones, the remnants of a cannibal feast". He later told his son Gilbert of a visit he had made to the Te Totara Pa site in 1826. Five years before, in 1821, a Ngāpuhi taua (war party), led by Hongi Hika, had slaughtered the Ngāti Maru, living there. But when Gilbert Mair senior walked there in 1826, he had still found it "... strewn with human bones – a veritable Golgotha".

Shortly after Elizabeth and Gilbert married, in 1828, the famous Ngāpuhi rangatira Hongi Hika died. He had provided protection to the missionary community, and the time following his death was of considerable anxiety for the settlers.

== Trader ==
In February 1830 Gilbert Mair purchased 159 hectares (1.59 km^{2}) of land at Te Wahapu Point, some four km south of Kororāreka (nowadays Russell). This was the first of a long chain of trading ventures. He purchased the land with goods, including six muskets, many casks of gunpowder and hundreds of musket balls and flints. Here he built up a flourishing trading station. He built his home on an elevated site above the trading station. He was "one of the first to exploit the kauri gum industry, he exported gum to the United States and timber and flax to Sydney.

In that same year of settling at Te Wahapu, the so-called Girls' War broke out in Kororāreka, during which the chief Hengi was killed. Eventually the Reverend Henry Williams persuaded the warriors to stop the fighting. The Reverend Samuel Marsden had arrived on a visit and over the following weeks he and Henry Williams attempted to negotiate a settlement in which Kororāreka would be ceded by Pōmare II as compensation for Hengi's death, which was accepted by those engaged in the fighting. In 1837 Pōmare II fought a three month war with Tītore in the Bay of Islands. An underlying cause of the fighting was a dispute as to the boundary line of the Kororāreka block that had been surrendered as a consequence of the death of Hengi some seven years previously in the Girls’ War.

In 1840 the signing of the Treaty of Waitangi finally brought a period of peace to the country.

In 1842 Mair sold his business and property at Wahapu. In the beginning of the 1840s he had purchased 728 hectares (7.28 km^{2}) at Whangārei. The family moved there in 1842, and lived in a house, he called "Deveron". From this base, Mair continued "active trading in a number of fields – kauri timber, kauri gum, whaling, as well as general trading and his own farming venture". In 1845 the situation again became so difficult when the Flagstaff War began in the Bay of Islands, that Gilbert Mair asked the governor to send a vessel to take all settlers to Auckland. Mair "only had three peaceful years in his new home in Whangārei, when he and his family were driven out by hostile natives, going to Auckland for some months, then back to the Bay in 1846, finally returning to Whangārei in 1847".

== Other occupations ==
Gilbert Mair was appointed Justice of Peace by Governor William Hobson.

Mair was "involved in representations to the British government to have New Zealand declared a British colony, and in the formation of the Kororareka Association, a controversial attempt at settler self-rule".

Gilbert Mair "met and entertained many notable people who visited the Bay. Among them was Bishop Broughton of Sydney, who consecrated the Church at Russell in 1842; Bishop Selwyn; Charles Darwin, the celebrated naturalist; Allan Cunningham, a well-known botanist; Admiral Sir James McClintoch (…) and many others".

Samuel Marsden introduced the first horses to New Zealand, from Sydney; Gilbert Mair "bought the next lot from a shipment to Kororareka from Valparaíso. He sold one horse which was sent to the East Coast, and the others he took to Whangārei".

== Gilbert Mair Junior ==
Being raised amongst Māori his son Gilbert was a fluent speaker of the Māori language. During the attack on Auckland by the Ngāti Maniapoto and the Ngāti Hauā in 1863, Gilbert junior joined the Forest Rangers under William Jackson, as an ensign or trainee officer. He took part in the Invasion of Waikato against the rebel Māori Kīngitanga forces and became famous in late 1863 for entering into discussions with the rebels during the Battle of Orakau under a flag of truce. The government forces were aware that a number of women and children were in the stronghold and Mair pleaded with the rebels to let them out but they refused and shot Mair in the shoulder. Mair later became and officer and lead the hunt for Te Kooti between 1868 and 1872 which led to the defeat of Te Kooti's guerillas. Mair was able to convince Ngāi Tūhoe Ringatū, who had been part of Te Kooti's band, to lead the government forces to Te Kooti's secret camp in the Ureweras. Mair later became a government officer trusted with establishing friendly relationships with Rewi Maniapoto in the 1880s.

== Literature ==
- Cowan, James (1933) – 'The Mair Brothers, soldiers and pioneers'; in: New Zealand Railways Magazine, Vol. 8, Issue 8 (1 December 1933) – online available at New Zealand Electronic Text Centre (NZETC)
- Crosby, Ron (2004) – Gilbert Mair, Te Kooti's Nemesis. Reed Publ. Auckland. ISBN 0-7900-0969-2
- Jackson, Lavinia Laura (Mair) (1935) – Annals of a New Zealand Family; The Household of Gilbert Mair, Early Pioneer. Publ. A.H. & A.W. Reed, Dunedin / Wellington
- Smith, S. Percy (1910) – Maori Wars of the Nineteenth Century. Christchurch. online available at NZETC
