= Richard Sissons =

New Zealand doctor and Anglican lay reader

Richard Sissons (1819 – 4 August 1893) was a notable New Zealand doctor and Anglican lay reader.

Sissons was born in Kingston upon Hull, Yorkshire, England in 1819, the son of merchant Thomas Sissons. The family was related to the Sissons Brothers paint manufacturers of Hull. Sissons qualified in medicine in 1842. In the 1860s he emigrated with his wife to Australia and New Zealand before returning to England. His wife had died in Australia and later he came back to New Zealand, to join his brother Robert Sissons. He married Matilda Helen Mair in 1868; she was the daughter of early settler Gilbert Mair.

Sissons established a general practice in Kamo, Whangārei where he was also the public vaccinator from 1885. He was a lay reader in the Anglican church from 1871 and involved in many other community activities such as the Freemasons, the high school board, and county council. He was known to be generous and held in high regard.

Sissons died in Kamo on 4 August 1893 and after a very large funeral was buried in the Kamo Cemetery.
