= William Gilbert Mair =

William Gilbert Mair (20 November 1832 – 8 July 1912) was a soldier, resident magistrate, and judge of the Native Land Court in early New Zealand.

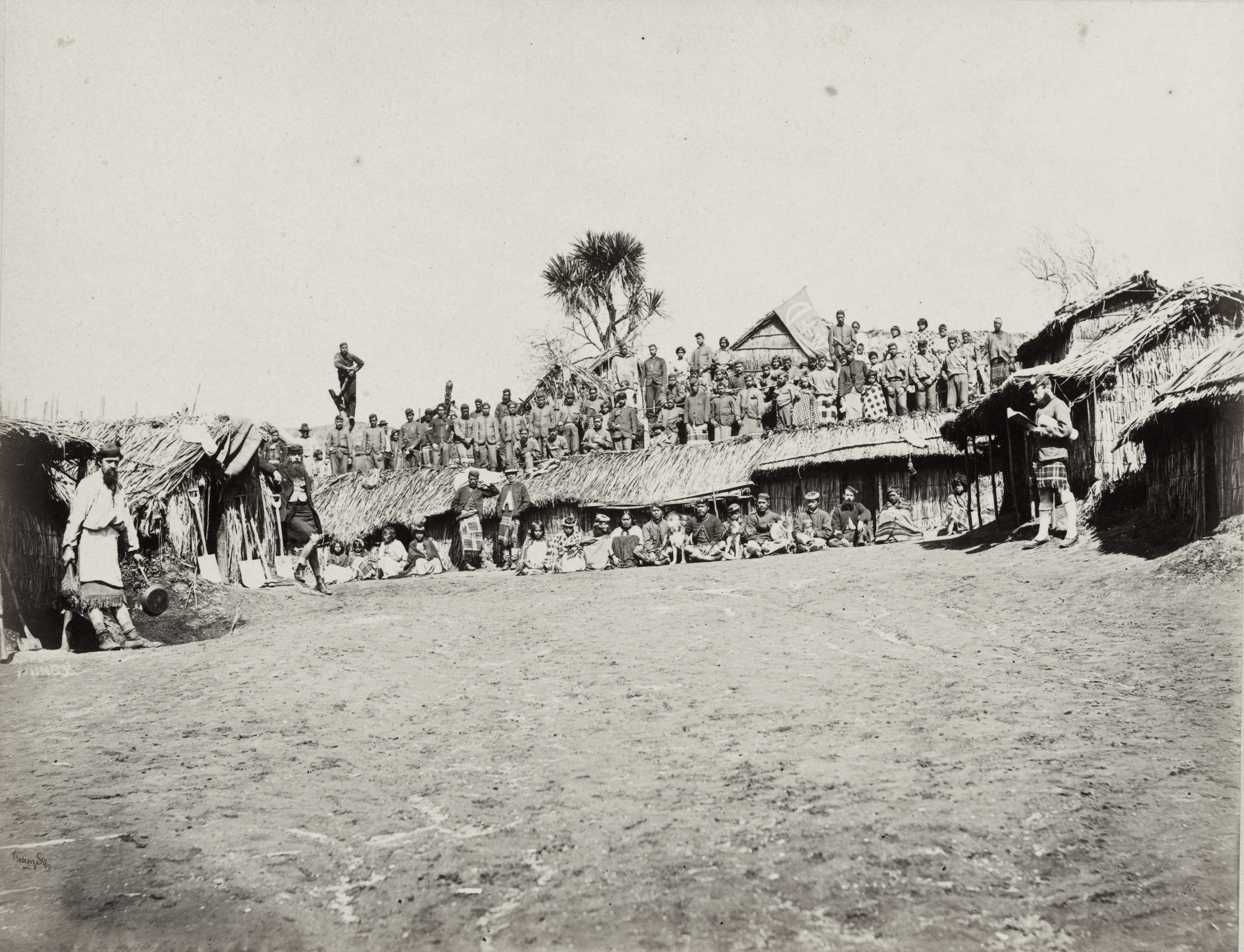
William Mair and the Arawa fighting contingent, Rotokakahi (Green Lake), Aotearoa-New Zealand, 1870

Born at the Bay of Islands, Mair was the son of one of the earliest European settlers, trader Gilbert Mair. He married Jane Cathcart Black at Auckland on 15 May 1872.

At the outbreak of the Waikato War he joined the Colonial Defence Force, and took part in the fighting round Pukekohe and Rangiriri. He later reached the rank of Major in the New Zealand Militia, and took part in campaigns against the Hauhau and Te Kooti.

In 1869 he was a member of the expedition led by Colonel George Whitmore into Te Urewera, by way of Fort Galatea and the Ahikareru Valley.

His brother was Captain Gilbert Mair, who also participated in Te Kooti's War.
