= Kathleen Vane =

New Zealand artist (1891–1965)

Kathleen Airini Vane
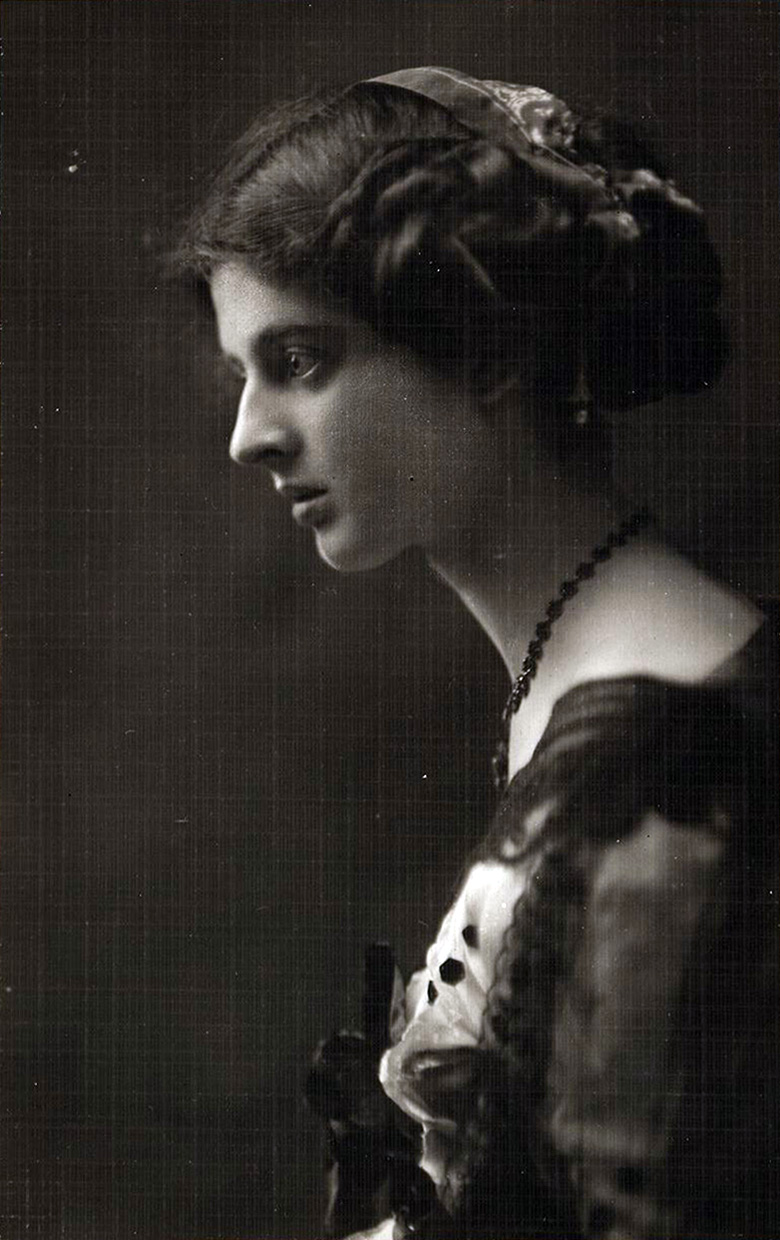
- Born: 22 January 1891; Wainuiomata
- Died: 9 February 1965 (aged 74)
- Education: Slade School of Fine Art
- Known for: Landscapes
- Spouse: Ralph Frederick Vane

Kathleen (Kitty) Airini Vane (née Mair; 22 January 1891 – 1965) was a New Zealand painter who specialised in watercolours and tempera landscape paintings. Many of her paintings can now be found in art museums and galleries all over the world. Her works that remain in New Zealand are included in the collections of the internationally known Sarjeant Gallery, Dunedin Public Art Gallery, Whangārei Museum, Tauranga Art Gallery, Reyburn House (Whangarei) and the New Zealand National (Alexander Turnbull) Archives. Two portraits of Vane are in the collection of the National Portrait Gallery, London.

== Biography ==
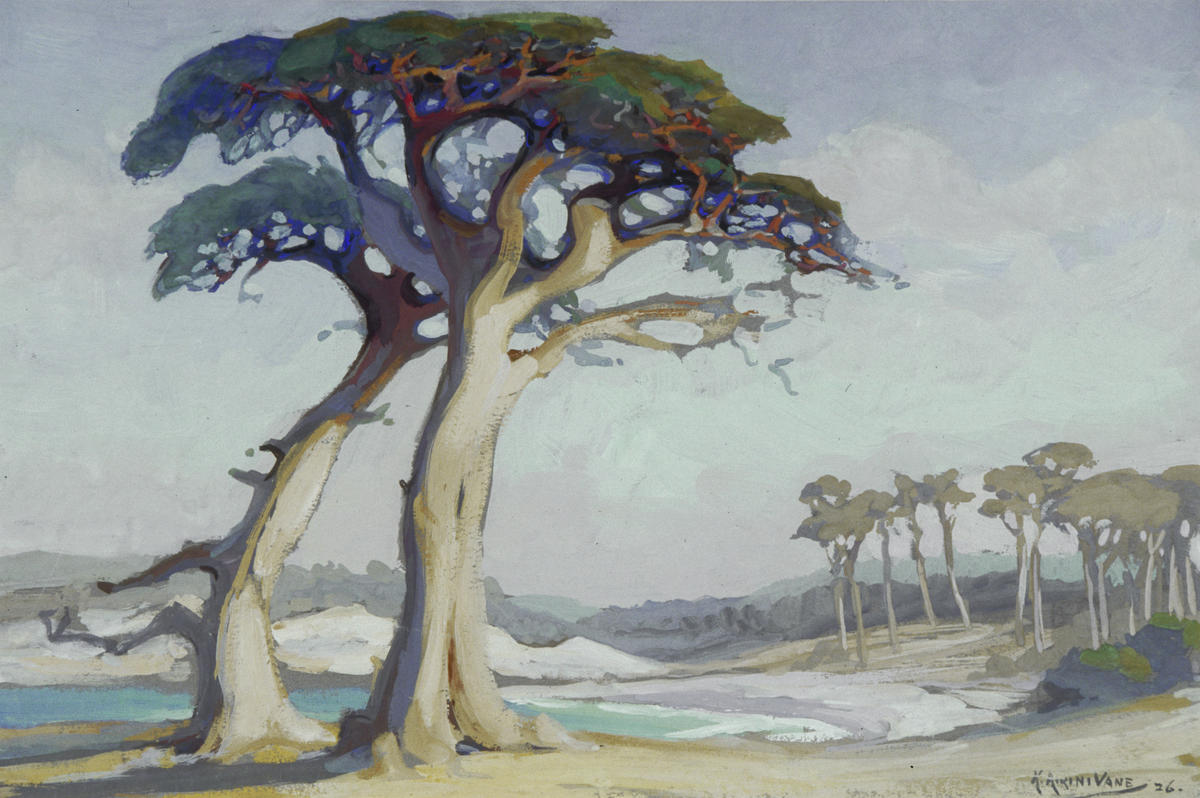
Evening, Monterey Cypress, California. 1926 - Sarjeant Gallery

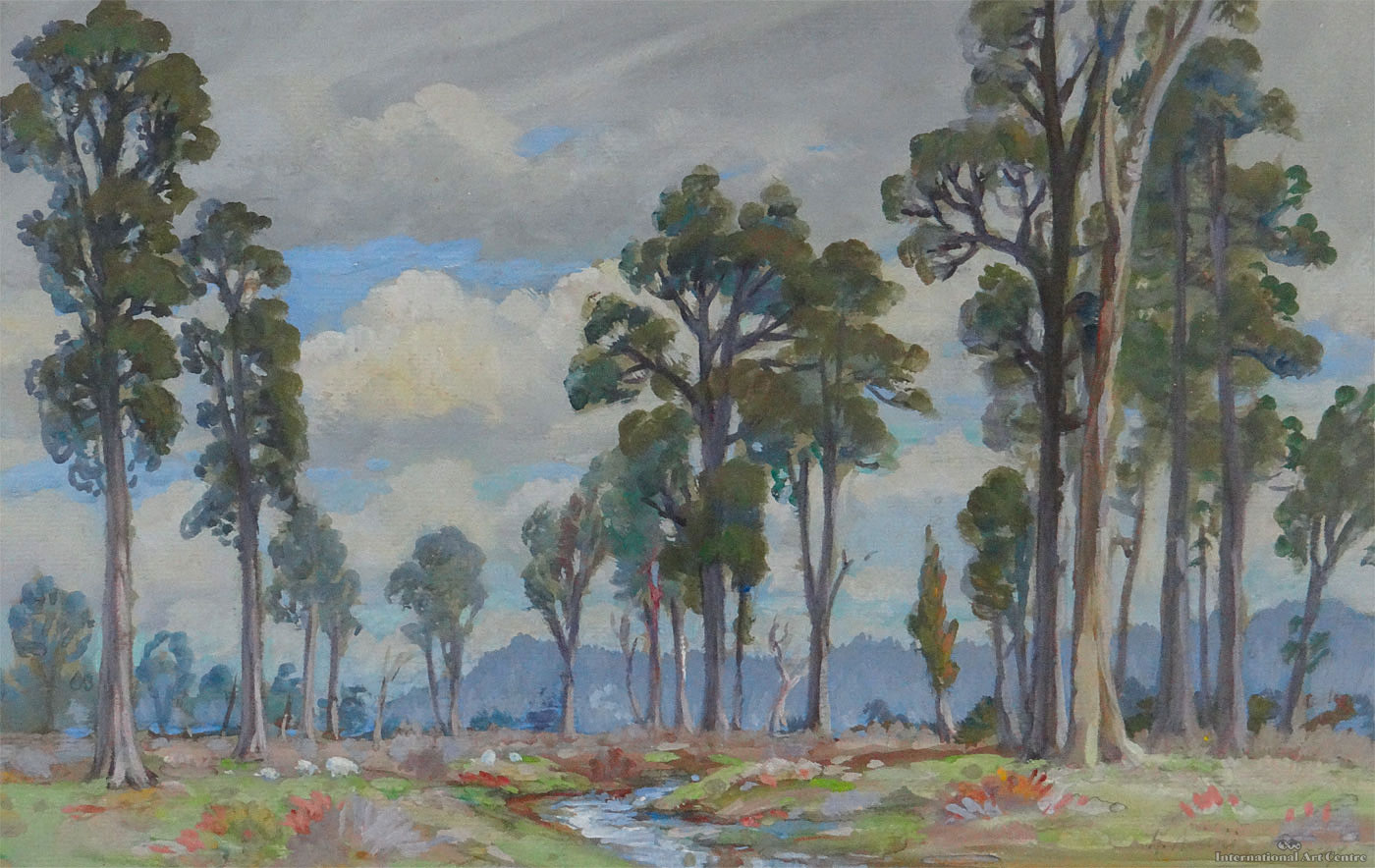
Trees. 1947 - International Art Centre

Vane was born in Wainuiomata, the daughter of Gilbert Mair and Eleanor Katherine (née Sperry) Mair. She had an older brother, John Gilbert, who died in childhood. Her mother, a noted portrait artist, died when she was three years old and she was raised by a Scottish nurse. She attended a private school, Misses Bews' Ladies College in Mt Eden, Auckland and also studied art.

Vane's main artistic passion was painting trees. Later in her artistic career, this would earn her the moniker the 'pōhutukawa lady'. In 1912 she travelled to London, England and studied at the Royal College of Art and the Slade School of Fine Art.

During World War I she served as a nurse aide in France. After the war she travelled and painted extensively, exhibiting in London, Paris and Malta. In 1924, her paintings were displayed at the Paris Salon. In 1929, Vane's works were accepted by the Royal Academy of Arts in London.

During World War II she returned to New Zealand. She spent most of wartime in the city of Tauranga. Vane would leave New Zealand after the war but would return again in 1953, this time to retire. Vane would finish her career as a painter four years later, in 1956 after an accident She died at Laings Beach (now Langs Beach) near Mangawhai, Northland, in 1965.

== Personal life ==
Vane was an avid social figure in London society, often frequenting the High Commission of New Zealand, London alongside fellow New Zealander and author, Jane Mander. She was also part of the farewell party at Westminster Palace Hotel, which sent off Arthur Foljambe, 2nd Earl of Liverpool.

In 1917 she married Ralph Frederick Vane, a son of Lord and Lady Barnard of Raby Castle, England. The ceremony was extensively covered in the London papers. He died in 1928.
