= Kate Sperrey =

New Zealand artist (1862–1893)

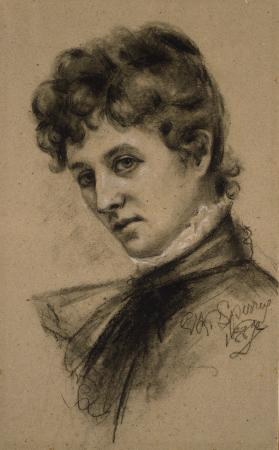
- 1887 self portrait
- Born: Eleanor Catherine Sperrey; 7 January 1862; Geelong, Victoria, Australia
- Died: 23 April 1893 (aged 31); Blenheim, New Zealand
- Other names: Eleanor K. Mair, Kate Mair, E. Kate Sperry, Katherine Sperry
- Occupation: artist
- Years active: 1885–1893
- Known for: portraiture
- Spouse: Gilbert Mair (soldier) (m. 1888–1893)
- Children: John Gilbert Mair (5 July 1889 - 1896), Kathleen Airini Vane née Mair (22 Jan 1891 - 9 Feb 1965)

Eleanor Catherine Sperrey (7 January 1862 – 23 April 1893), also known as Kate Sperrey, was a leading artist in New Zealand in the latter half of the nineteenth century. Although she engaged in landscape and genre painting, Sperrey was best known as a portraitist and for her depictions of Māori figures. Sperrey's works are held in the permanent collections of the Museum of New Zealand Te Papa Tongarewa, the Alexander Turnbull Library, Auckland Art Gallery Toi o Tāmaki, Te Whare o Rehua Sarjeant Gallery, Christchurch Art Gallery Te Puna o Waiwhetū and the Whangārei Art Museum.

== Early life and marriage ==
Eleanor Catherine Sperrey was born on 7 January 1862 in Geelong, Victoria, Australia to Eleanor (née Maunder) and John Sperrey. The following year, her family moved to Dunedin, New Zealand, where her father, who had been a timber merchant, was engaged in the sub-treasurer's office as a clerk. In 1865, her mother died and Sperrey was raised by her father. She began studies at Otago Girls' High School in 1873, and studied art with David Con Hutton, principal of the Otago School of Art. She submitted work to the Intercolonial Juvenile Industrial Exhibition at Melbourne in 1880 and won a silver medal. Around 1881, Sperrey travelled to Rome to study portraiture with Giuseppe Ferrari. Her study of an Italian goatherd, now held in the collection of Museum of New Zealand Te Papa Tongarewa, won a gold medal in the Prix de Rome competition and was considered by many to be her masterpiece. Before she returned home to New Zealand, Sperrey also studied in London and Paris.

On 19 September 1888 in Wellington, Sperrey married Captain Gilbert Mair, whose portrait she had painted in 1886 when he had been awarded the New Zealand Cross. Mair was a soldier and civil servant, who had previously fathered two sons and a daughter with the Ngāti Tūwharetoa woman, Keita Kupa. Sperrey and Mair had two children of their own: John Gilbert, on 5 July 1889, who died in infancy; and Kathleen Irene, known as Airini, (1891–1965), who would become a noted artist under her married name, as K. Airini Vane. After her marriage, Sperrey signed her works as E. K. Mair.

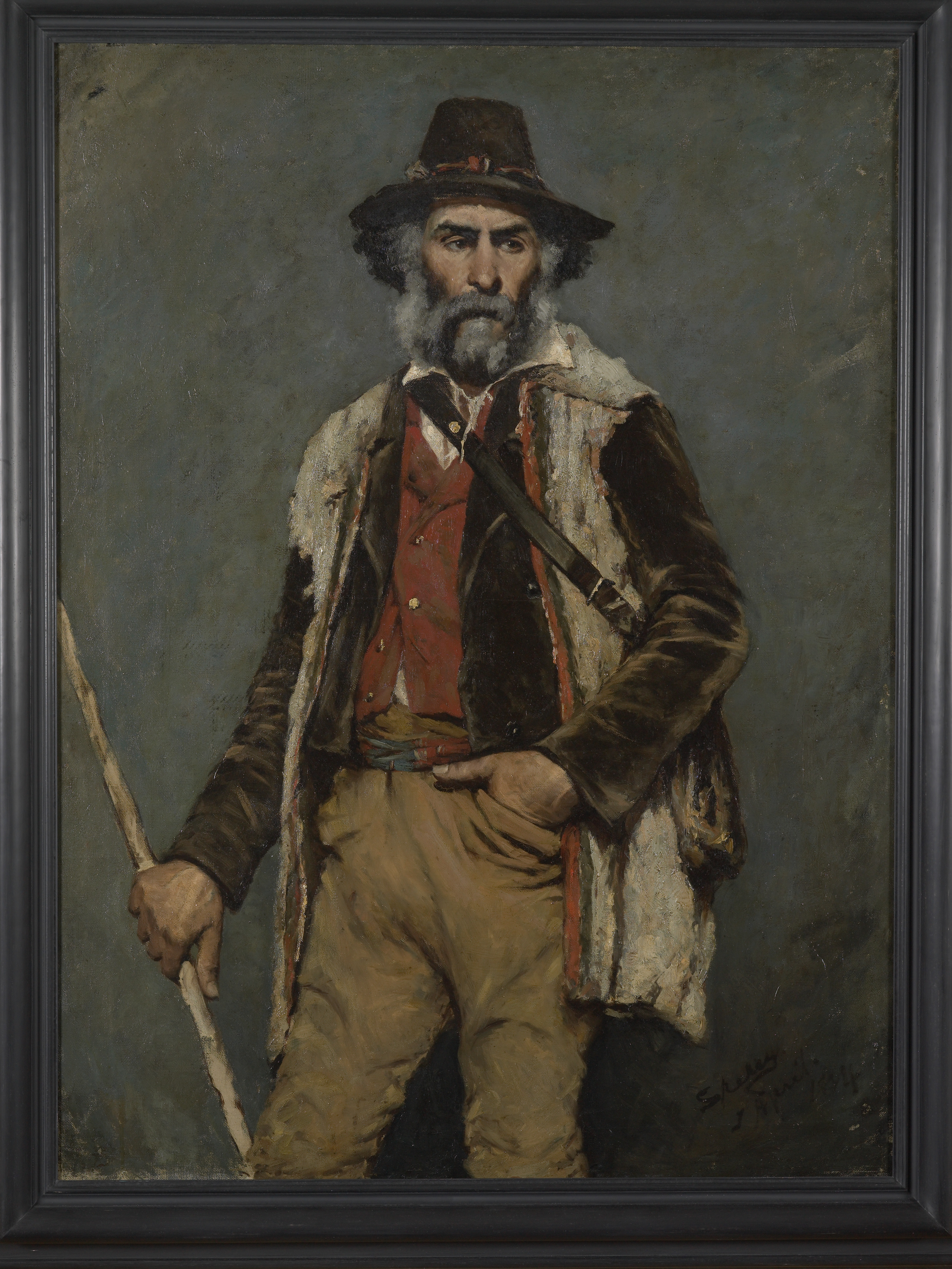
Italian goatherd, 1884, by Eleanor Catherine Sperrey. Gift of Miss K. A. Mair, 1912. Te Papa (1912-0029-1)

== Career ==
Sperrey returned to New Zealand in 1884, moving to Wellington, where her father was living and working as the Commissioner of Taxation. She set up an office and became an official portrait artist, joining the New Zealand Art Students' Association in 1885. The organization, based in Auckland, encouraged members to paint solely subjects having to do with New Zealand. In 1886, she moved her studio to Lambton Quay. She participated in numerous exhibitions including the Canterbury Society of Arts annual exhibition in 1886, the Otago Art Society's shows in both 1886 and 1887, the New South Wales Art Society 1886 Sydney Town Hall exhibit, and the Auckland Society of Art's exhibitions of 1887 and 1888. At the 1889 Melbourne Centennial International Exhibition, Sperrey exhibited numerous oil paintings and one watercolour. She also exhibited works at the 1889 New Zealand and South Seas Exhibition in Dunerdin.

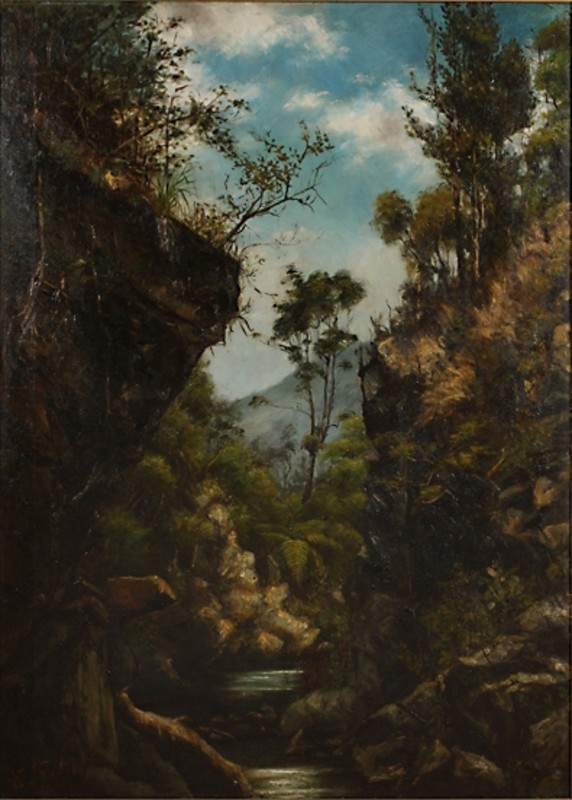
Bushstream Wainuiomata by Eleanor Catherine Sperry. Whangarei Art Museum Te Manawa Toi

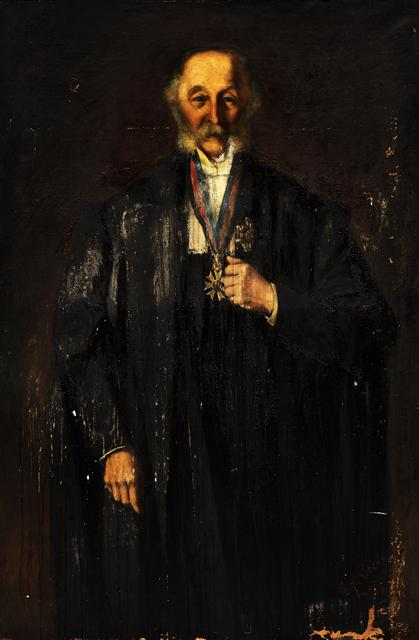
Sir William Fitzherbert by Eleanor Catherine Sperry. Whangarei Art Museum Te Manawa Toi

In 1889, Sperrey created paintings which earned first, second and third prizes, in the oil and water colour category of the Melbourne Fine Art Exhibit. Predominantly known as a portrait artist, she painted the likenesses of such figures as Sir Harry Atkinson, John Ballance, Sir William Fitzherbert, Sir George Grey, and James Macandrew, among many others. She was also renowned for her paintings of Māori subjects, some of which included Wairingiringi, a Ngāti Mahuta woman and her husband, Te Wahanui, a Ngāti Maniapoto tribal leader.

In 1890, for New Zealand's Golden Jubilee, Thomas Bracken published Musings in Maoriland, which outlined the colony's development of art and literature. The 400-page commemorative volume was illustrated with sepia sketches by Sperrey which were engraved in Nuremberg, Germany.

== Death and legacy ==
Mair died on 23 April 1893 in Blenheim, New Zealand and was buried in Wellington in the Bolton Street Cemetery, beside her father. Two of Sperrey's last works were portraits of her own children.

In 2000, a retrospective of her works were presented by the Whangarei Art Museum between January and March, curated and designed by Scott Pothan, followed by a presentation in Whanganui at the Sarjeant Gallery, which ran through the end of May. The Whangarei Art Museum hosted an exhibit featuring two of Mair's works, in 2012. One was her portrait of Prime Minister Sir George Grey and the other was a painting of a bush scene. The two paintings had been in storage for a century and are now part of the museum's permanent collection.
