= King Country =

Region of New Zealand

Coordinates: 38°40′0″S 175°10′0″E

- Unofficial region of New Zealand
- The King Country within New Zealand
- Country: New Zealand
- Island: North Island

Population
  - Region: 50,000 to 70,000 depending on definition of area

The King Country (Māori: Te Rohe Pōtae or Rohe Pōtae o Maniapoto) is a region of the western North Island of New Zealand. It extends approximately from Kawhia Harbour and the town of Ōtorohanga in the north to the upper reaches of the Whanganui River in the south, and from the Hauhungaroa and Rangitoto Ranges in the east to near the Tasman Sea in the west. It comprises hill country, large parts of which are forested.

The region, albeit loosely defined, is very significant in New Zealand's history. The term "King Country" dates from the New Zealand Wars of the 1860s, when colonial forces invaded the Waikato and forces of the Māori King Movement withdrew south of what was called the aukati, or boundary, a line of pā alongside the Puniu River near Kihikihi. Land behind the aukati remained native territory, with Europeans warned they crossed it under threat of death.

Known for its rugged, rural roads and diverse landscape, the King Country has a warm climate, considered subtropical.

== Government ==
The King Country is not an entity in local government. It forms part of two local government regions, Waikato and Manawatū-Whanganui, and all or part of four districts: Ōtorohanga, Ruapehu, Taupō and Waitomo.

Taranaki-King Country is a parliamentary electorate for central government. The member represents an area which stretches from the outskirts of New Plymouth City to the outskirts of Hamilton City and including the King Country towns of Te Awamutu, Ōtorohanga and Te Kūiti.

== Geography ==
The King Country or Western Uplands is largely made up of rolling hill country, including the Rangitoto and Hauhungaroa Ranges. It includes extensive karst regions, producing such features as the Waitomo Caves.

The area is largely rural and sparsely settled, with no cities or large towns. The most significant townships are the rural service centres of Te Kūiti and Ōtorohanga (in the north) and Taumarunui (in the south).

== History ==
Prior to European settlement, the area was occupied by various Māori iwi, especially Ngāti Maniapoto, Ngāti Tama, and Ngāti Tūwharetoa.

In July 1863, Governor Sir George Grey ordered an invasion of the Waikato with colonial forces supplemented by small numbers of British-allied Maori. The invasion was aimed at suppressing Kingite power, which was seen by the colonial government as a threat to Crown authority in New Zealand; it was also aimed to drive Waikato Maori from the region in readiness for occupation and settlement by Pakeha settlers.

Heavily outnumbered and disadvantaged by superior firepower, the Kingite forces retreated southwards from the Waikato after the battle at Ōrākau in April 1864, eventually being forced to flee to Maniapoto land, later called the King Country.

At this time, the region received a Māori name, Rohe pōtae. This name translates as "Area of the Hat", and is said to have originated when the second Māori King Tāwhiao put his white top hat on a large map of the North Island and declared that all land covered by the hat would be under his mana (or authority).

Heavy casualties at the Battle of Gate Pa at Tauranga in April 1864 prompted General Duncan Cameron to abandon plans for further military campaigns in the Waikato area, and Grey and the colonial government were forced to accept this decision. The King Country, mountainous, poor and isolated, was not an attractive conquest. King Tāwhiao and his followers were able to maintain a rebel Māori monarchy in exile and a refuge for rebel Māori opposed to the government for more than a decade although living conditions were very poor. This may be partly due to the large influx of about 3,500 Waikato people who swamped the resources of the approximately 800 Maniapoto living in the rohe.

On 15 May 1872 Te Kooti, on the run from government forces, crossed the Waikato River and entered the territory as supplicant and was granted asylum. In 1880, William Moffat, apparently a land agent or buyer, was shot and killed.

In 1881, as a result of ongoing friction with his hosts over the question of land sales, and a general amnesty being granted to the rebels, Tāwhiao emerged and laid down the King Movement's arms. After successful negotiations between the government, Wahanui, Rewi and Taonui, including a pardon for Te Kooti by 1883 the King Country was made accessible to Europeans. It was opened to road surveying, and the start of the Main Trunk Line - but with a prohibition on the sale of alcohol throughout the district. At a March 1883 meeting, John Bryce got a compact that allowed the surveying of the rail route. At a February 1885 meeting at Kihikihi with John Ballance construction of the line was approved. Ballance was criticised for not requiring cession of land alongside the route (which would rise in value because of the line), but he knew that would not be acceptable to Māori.

Construction of the railway began in 1885, and finished in 1908, with the completion greatly improving transport and communications in the King Country, promoting settlement and farming in the area - as well as assisting in the growth of rural service towns such as Taumarunui which was an important railway depot until the 1950s.

The alcohol ban continued as section 272 of the Licensing Act 1908—see the map of the "Boundaries of the King Country Licensing Area" in Jonathan Sarich's 2011 report. As a young man, John A. Lee was jailed for smuggling alcohol into the area around 1910. In 1923 and again in 1926, in response to a pro-alcohol petition sent around for signatures, another deputation of leaders of the King Country -- Te Rata Mahuta Tawhiao Potarau (fourth Māori King), Tuwhakaririka Patana, Hotu Tana Pakukohatu, and Thirty Leading Chiefs of the King Country—came before the Prime Minister to petition that the prohibition against alcohol in their area be protected. In March 1949 Korokī Mahuta, the fifth Māori King (1933-1966), and Princess Te Kirihaehae Te Puea Herangi (1883-1952) led a 400-strong delegation to Parliament, representing the people of the Waikato, Ngāti Maniapoto, Taranaki, Ngāti Tūwharetoa and Te Wainui a Rua, concerning the "King Country Pact" to protect the prohibition line. However, their plea was ignored, and in 1951 1000 Māori rallied at Tauranganui Pa, Tuakau to protest the laxity in allowing alcohol in their area. In 1951 the National Party was re-elected, and one of its campaign promises was for a single referendum on no-license in the King Country. In 1953 a Bill was introduced for a joint poll requiring a 60% majority in November 1954, and the result was predictable given the demographics of the population then living in the area: licensing was carried by a large majority: 80% for European and 25% of Maori in favour of a license.

== Economy ==
The greater part of the region's economy is involved in farming (especially pastoral farming) and forestry, with some supporting services. There are some areas of tourist significance, such as Waitomo Caves. The King Country also contains areas of conservation estate, especially Pureora Forest Park.

From 1966 to 31 March 2010, King Country Radio (with the call sign 1ZU) operated from Taumarunui.

== Sport ==
The King Country Rugby Football Union has produced several rugby union players who became All Blacks: Kevin Boroevich, Ron Bryers, Colin Meads, Stan Meads, Jack McLean, Bill Phillips, Joe Ratima and Graham Whiting.

The North King Country association football team plays in a yellow and blue strip. It is based in Ōtorohanga.
