= Rewi Maniapoto =

New Zealand Māori chief (1807–1894)

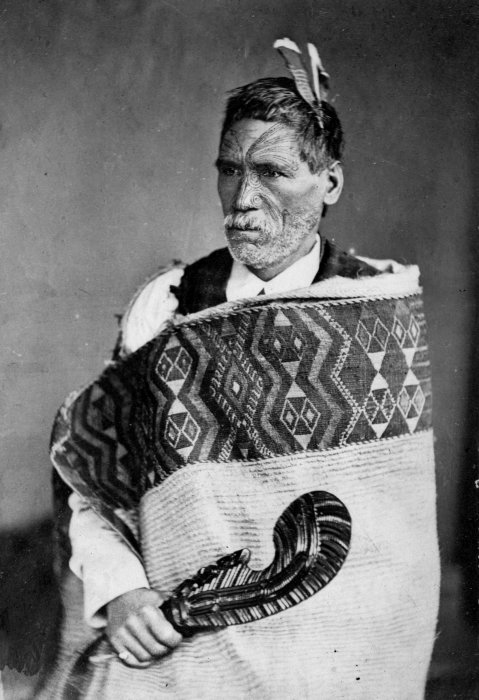
Rewi Manga Maniapoto in 1879

Rewi Manga Maniapoto (1807–1894) was a Ngāti Maniapoto chief who led Kīngitanga forces during the New Zealand government Invasion of Waikato during the New Zealand Wars.

== Kinship ==
Rewi, or Manga as he was known to his kin, was the child of Paraheke (Te Kore) and Te Ngohi. His mother Paraheke was from Ngāti Raukawa with close connections to Ngāti Kaputuhi. His father Te Ngohi, also known as Kawhia, was a renowned fighting chief of Ngāti Paretekawa a sub-hapu of Ngāti Maniapoto and was a signatory to the Treaty of Waitangi, one of five chiefs from Maniapoto who signed. Rewi had a younger brother named Te Raore or Te Roore who was killed at Orakau. Te Raore married Kereihi aka Te Oreore Purau from Ngāti Tuwhakataha and they had a daughter named Te Raueue Te Raore who died leaving no issue. When Pareheke was killed at Paterangi, Te Ngohi remarried a woman named Kahutuangau from Ngāti Te Kanawa and Ngāti Parekahuki a sub hapu of Ngāti Maniapoto, they had a daughter named Te Whakahae aka Ripeka she was a half-sister to Rewi Manga Maniapoto and all her descendants are the Muraahi, Mokau and Waho families from Napinapi Marae near the settlement of Piopio.

== Early life ==
As a young man he accompanied his father on attacks in Taranaki during the long running, intertribal, musket wars. He gave protection to the missionary Morgan who moved into his rohe in 1841. He became friendly with Catholic missionaries who also settled in the area. He was educated by Wesleyan missionaries and became literate and welcomed the development of his rohe into a productive European style farming community with the planting of wheat, the establishment of several flour mills, and the mass planting of fruit trees. The missionaries, together with the government, initially financed the mills and arranged for European millers to settle and produce flour. The missionaries built a trade school in Te Awamutu to teach literacy and practical skills such as making and repairing agricultural tools.

Conflict arose between competing Waikato iwi in the Te Awamutu area over long-contested land. Ngāti Maniapoto was jealous of the attention given to Ngāti Mahuta and Ngāti Raukawa who had acquired European knowledge and goods. Initially, only a few acres were sold to settlers. Later 800 acres was sold for the trade school and its food supply. Tensions simmered verging on open war. Ngāti Mahuta was intimidated by Maniapoto and promised not to sell any more land. Throughout this period Rewi Maniapoto was the tribal chief.

The core of Ngāti Mahuta then moved out of the area in 1849 to settle on land in Māngere provided for them by the government to guard Auckland from an attack from the south. This event demonstrates the character of the redoubtable Rewi, as Te Wherowhero was a great warrior chief not to be trifled with.

During the 1850s he became influenced by Māori who wanted greater autonomy. He was one of five chiefs who signed a document banning Government magistrates from his rohe. When conflict arose over Māori land sales in Taranaki he sided with those Māori who withheld their land from sale and by 1860 was supporting the Taranaki chief Wiremu Kīngi Te Rangitāke in his struggle with the government. Rewi went to Taranaki and took part in the fighting against the government and was involved in two battles himself.

Increasingly he became aware that the governor George Grey was determined to undermine the Kīngitanga movement. Grey came to the Waikato and bluntly told chiefs he would dig around the movement until it fell. By 1863 tension in the Waikato rose as Rewi took more militant action.

On 4 April Grey arranged for a 300-strong Imperial force to evict Māori from the contested Tataramaika block in Taranaki and reoccupy it. Māori viewed the reoccupation as an act of war and on 4 May a party of about 40 Ngāti Ruanui warriors carried out a revenge attack, ambushing a small military party on a coastal road at nearby Ōakura, killing all but one of the 10 soldiers. The ambush, ordered by Rewi, may have been planned as an assassination attempt on Grey, who regularly rode the track between New Plymouth and the Tataraimaka military post.

He destroyed a magistrates court in North Waikato and together with Wiremu Kīngi destroyed the trade school at Te Awamutu, stealing the press. Rewi was annoyed that the government was publishing an anti-Kīngitanga paper in his rohe. Other Waikato chiefs were concerned at his actions. Several large meetings were held, such as the one at Peria, where Rewi argued his case for attacking the government, while others, such as Wiremu Tamihana, argued for a less extreme approach and more negotiation with the government.

Other events, such as the attempted kidnapping of settlers' wives and children, further raised tension, as did the interference by Catholic missionaries who suggested British settlers and officials were spies. Pompallier, the Catholic Bishop, further heightened tension by suggesting he start another mission in the area to counter the influence of the protestant Church Missionary Society (CMS). As the king's sister, Te Paea, and other chiefs such as Wi Koramoa and Tanti(sic) were protestant this did not eventuate.

== Invasion of the Waikato ==
On 10 July 1863, Grey ordered the invasion of the Kingite territory, claiming he was making a punitive expedition against Rewi over the Ōakura ambush and a pre-emptive strike to thwart a "determined and bloodthirsty" plot to attack Auckland. On 12 July General Cameron and the first echelon of the invading army crossed the Mangatāwhiri Stream - the Invasion of the Waikato had begun.

Maniapoto fought 1863-64 and made a final stand at Orakau in 1864. Rewi and the Kīngitanga (Māori King Movement) troops were surrounded by the government forces, with limited supplies of food and water. The government forces built a sap (trench) up to within 20m of the pā and threw in hand grenades. Gilbert Mair, an officer who spoke Māori fluently, invited them to surrender or at least let out the woman and children. The Kingites replied with the famous words "Ka whawhai tonu mātou, Ake! Ake! Ake!" ("We will fight on forever and ever!"). At 3:30pm the same day a gun was brought to the head of the sap and shelled the pā at point-blank range. At this the defenders panicked and, leaving 50 toa (warriors) in the pā, the rest made a sudden breakthrough the government lines and into adjacent swamps. All 50 in the pā were killed or taken prisoner. 160 Kīngitanga people died. Half of the escapees were wounded. Seventeen of the government forces died and 52 were wounded.

== Move to the King Country ==
Maniapoto stayed in the King Country south of the Puniu River with the surviving Māori. He constructed two more pā but the government forces did not follow him into the hills. Maniapoto played host to the Waikato iwi (tribe) but relationships soured when the king tried to exert his mana over Maniapoto's land. This, together with Maniapoto's refusal to stand and fight at the battle of Rangiriri in 1863, left a bitter note between the two groups. Rewi became concerned at the outbreaks of drunkenness among his people and the murdering of isolated Pākehā travelling in the area.

Rewi reluctantly sheltered Te Kooti, who had escaped from the Chatham Islands and then attacked and killed various Māori and European settlers. When Te Kooti came to Te Kuiti in 1869 he came to challenge Tawhaio for Māori kingship. The king was hostile to Rewi's actions as he did not want the Kīngitanga associated with Te Kooti's extreme violence and anti government activity yet he was very nervous of the Te Kooti's power to dominate. For months Rewi observed Te Kooti at close hand, as the Kīngitanga were considering restarting the fight against the government. The Kīngitanga was impressed by Te Kooti's audacity. Rewi himself wanted to judge Te Kooti's military prowess before coming to some political arrangement with him. They offered Te Kooti the option of living in peace in the King Country but he refused. After his decisive defeat at Te Porere, Rewi reported back that Te Kooti was no military genius. Magistrate William Searancke, who spoke fluent Māori, was present when Rewi met with Te Kooti and reported to the government that Te Kooti got very drunk and spoke at length about his past but not the future. Rewi Maniapoto remained sober and watchful.

== Return ==
In 1877, MP John Sheehan became Native Minister. He was a fluent Māori speaker and had assisted East Coast Māori in the Repudiation Movement in their efforts to reclaim the land they claimed had been wrongfully sold to large runholders. Sheehan had enhanced his reputation with Māori for backing them against government authority. He went to the King Country to talk to King Tāwhiao and Taranaki chiefs to get them to sell land to the government but they refused. However, he discovered that Rewi Maniapoto was keen to sell land. Initially, the government's idea was to open up the land to European settlers to encourage assimilation. Eventually Rewi agreed to sell land to the government for the main trunk railway line on the understanding that his men would be paid to cut the bush for the surveyors and no alcohol was to be sold in the King Country. Maniapoto was returned his tribal land at Kihikihi and given a house and a government pension. He became a great friend of Governor Grey and wished to be buried with him.

Rewi Maniapoto used his connections with the government to help the renegade Te Kooti be released from jail and resettle him on land in Whanganui.

== Honorific eponyms ==
Rewi Road in Royal Oak, New Zealand was named after Maniapoto in the late 1930s.
