= The Church of Jesus Christ of Latter-day Saints in New Zealand =

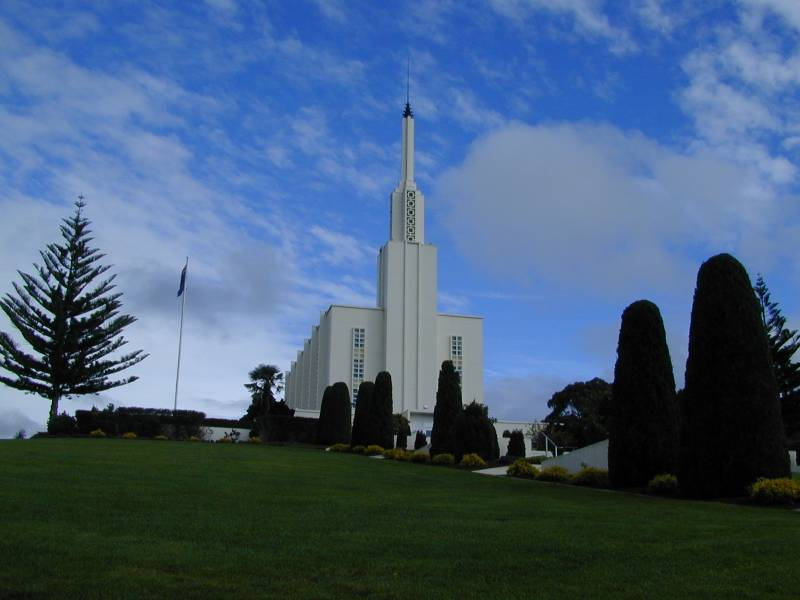
- Hamilton New Zealand Temple and grounds
- Area: Pacific
- Census: 54,348 (2023)
- Members: 120,992 (2025)
- Stakes: 29
- Districts: 2
- Wards: 170
- Branches: 49
- Total congregations: 219
- Missions: 3
- Temples: 2 operating; 1 under construction; 3 total
- FamilySearch Centers: 56

The Church of Jesus Christ of Latter-day Saints (LDS Church) established its first New Zealand branch in 1855. It reported 120,992 members in 219 congregations in New Zealand as of year-end 2025, making it the second largest body of LDS Church members in Oceania behind Australia. The LDS Church has two temples in New Zealand, with a third under construction. The 2023 census recorded 54,348 individuals, or 1.1% of respondents, self-identify as belonging to the faith while the reported Church membership (which includes all baptized members regardless of current self-identification) equated to about two percent of the general population.

== History ==
Membership in New Zealand
| Year | Membership |
|---|---|
| 1880 | 198 |
| 1887 | 2,573 |
| 1900* | 4,000 |
| 1930 | 7,075 |
| 1940 | 9,579 |
| 1950 | 12,155 |
| 1960 | 15,977 |
| 1970 | 28,694 |
| 1979 | 39,556 |
| 1989* | 76,000 |
| 1999 | 89,952 |
| 2009 | 99,488 |
| 2019 | 115,236 |
| 2025 | 120,992 |
*Membership was published as a rounded number.

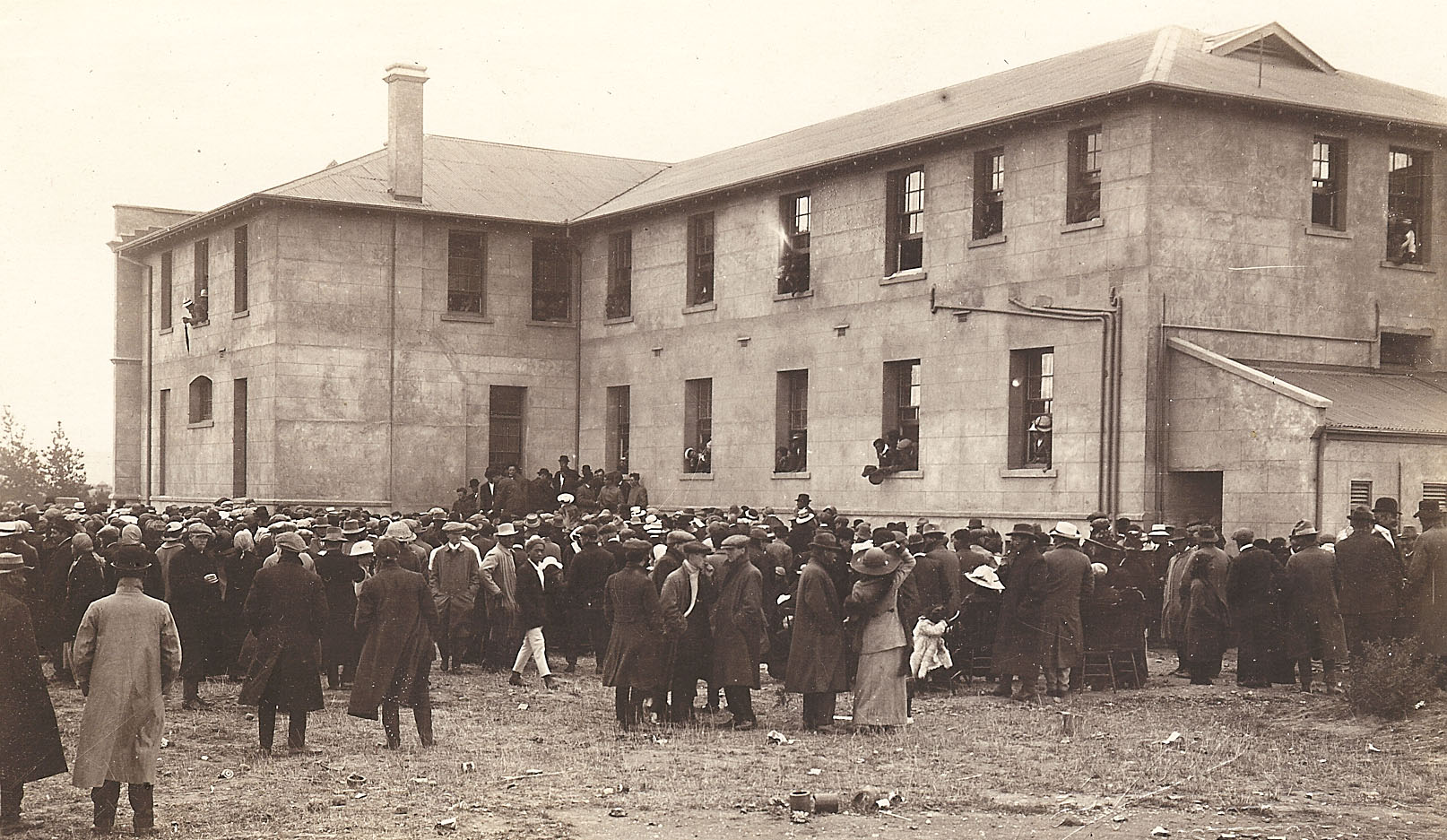
A Latter-day Saint assembly hall in New Zealand in 1912

New Zealand was already deeply religious with many Christian sects by the time Mormon missionaries arrived. Formal LDS Church missionary proselytizing began on 20 October 1854 by William Cooke and Thomas Holden, under the direction of mission president Augustus Farnham. All three men left for the island from the United States on the William Denney. However, due to lack of materials and interested individuals, the initial work was slow up until the 1870s when missionaries had more resources. These first proselyting efforts began as part of the Australasian Missionary efforts. In 1855, the first branch of the LDS Church was organised at Karori, with the next organised in Kaiapoi in 1867. The first stakes of New Zealand were created in Auckland on 18 May 1958, and then in Hamilton and Hawkes Bay in 1960. On 4 August 1897, the Australasian Mission was divided to give New Zealand its own respective mission. The mission was again divided in May 1958 to include a New Zealand South portion. As of May 2017, New Zealand has three missions based in Auckland, Wellington, and Hamilton, respectively. The LDS Church continues to hold a notable and respected presence in New Zealand, the first account being when Colonial Minister of Native affairs praised Mormonism for bringing good citizens to his nation back in 1912.

Despite the country being more than three quarters Māori, primitive missionary efforts focused on teaching the English-speaking Europeans living within New Zealand. It was not until the 1880s that missionary efforts shifted from exclusively preaching to the Pākehā (Europeans) to branching out to the indigenous Māori population. One theory for the LDS missionaries' early success amongst Māori was that this American religion was not associated with the British, whose relationship with Māori had soured by the 1880s. Another factor was that both the church and Māori had a focus on genealogy (whakapapa). Many Māori, particularly in Ngāti Kahungunu, saw the new church as a fulfillment of a prophecy made by Pāora Te Potangaroa shortly before his death in 1881, following a communal debate over which church Māori should put their faith in.

== Māori translations ==
By 1886, translation of the Word of Wisdom and the Articles of Faith was completed by Ezra F. Richards. In this same year, attempts to translate the Book of Mormon by various elders and mission presidents began. The most notable translators were Ezra F. Richards and Sondra Sanders, although some records state that William T. Steward and James Jury were other notable translators. On 26 April 1887, a home in the Waiapu District was dedicated for the translation of the Book of Mormon and in November of that same year, translation of the book was officially completed. The first editions of the Book of Mormon in the Māori language were published by the Star Publishing Company of Auckland. The entire cost of £371 to print the Book of Mormon was paid for by local New Zealand church members. In 1917, the second edition was published after extensive edits were made by Matthew Cowley under the direction of James N. Lambert. Shortly after its publication, Cowley was called to start the translation of other sacred texts. With the help of Wiremu Duncan and Stuart Meha, the Doctrine and Covenants and Pearl of Great Price were translated and eventually published in 1919.

== State Involvement ==
=== Māori Language Act of 1987 ===
Prior to the Māori Language Act (MLA), the church operated only in English. The MLA declared Māori as an official language of New Zealand and greatly encouraged biculturalism in the church. Following the MLA, the church removed language restrictions from its meetings, blessings, and more importantly, funerals, a sacred Māori practice. The first noted church events under the MLA include the dedication of the LDS marae (community centre) and wharenui (large ceremonial house). These buildings were dedicated in 1994 at the Church College, with prayers in Māori.

=== Church schools ===
After seeing a growing need for education in Māori villages, the LDS Church opened elementary schools to teach children in the English Language. As early as 1877, multiple efforts were made to start private schools that were eventually closed due to lack of interest or government schools opening in similar geographic areas. A government policy passed in 1922 caused more primary schools to open and required all schools to undergo inspection. Most church schools did not pass this inspection. Despite the mass reduction in church schools, one school, the Māori Agricultural College, was opened in an effort to educate local Mormons in agriculture as well as to combine secular knowledge with the spiritual. The school was dedicated in 1913 by Orson D. Romney. The school had strong music and sports programs, and the majority of its teachers and supplies came from the United States. In 1915, the church invested in 136 acres of land to add to the school. On this land they began raising pigs, chickens and other farm animals as an added means of income. Despite the school's growth, church leaders in Salt Lake City were concerned with its lack of matriculate growth and prestige and considered closing it down. Before this order could be made official, however, the Napier earthquake of 1931 destroyed the building and ended its use.

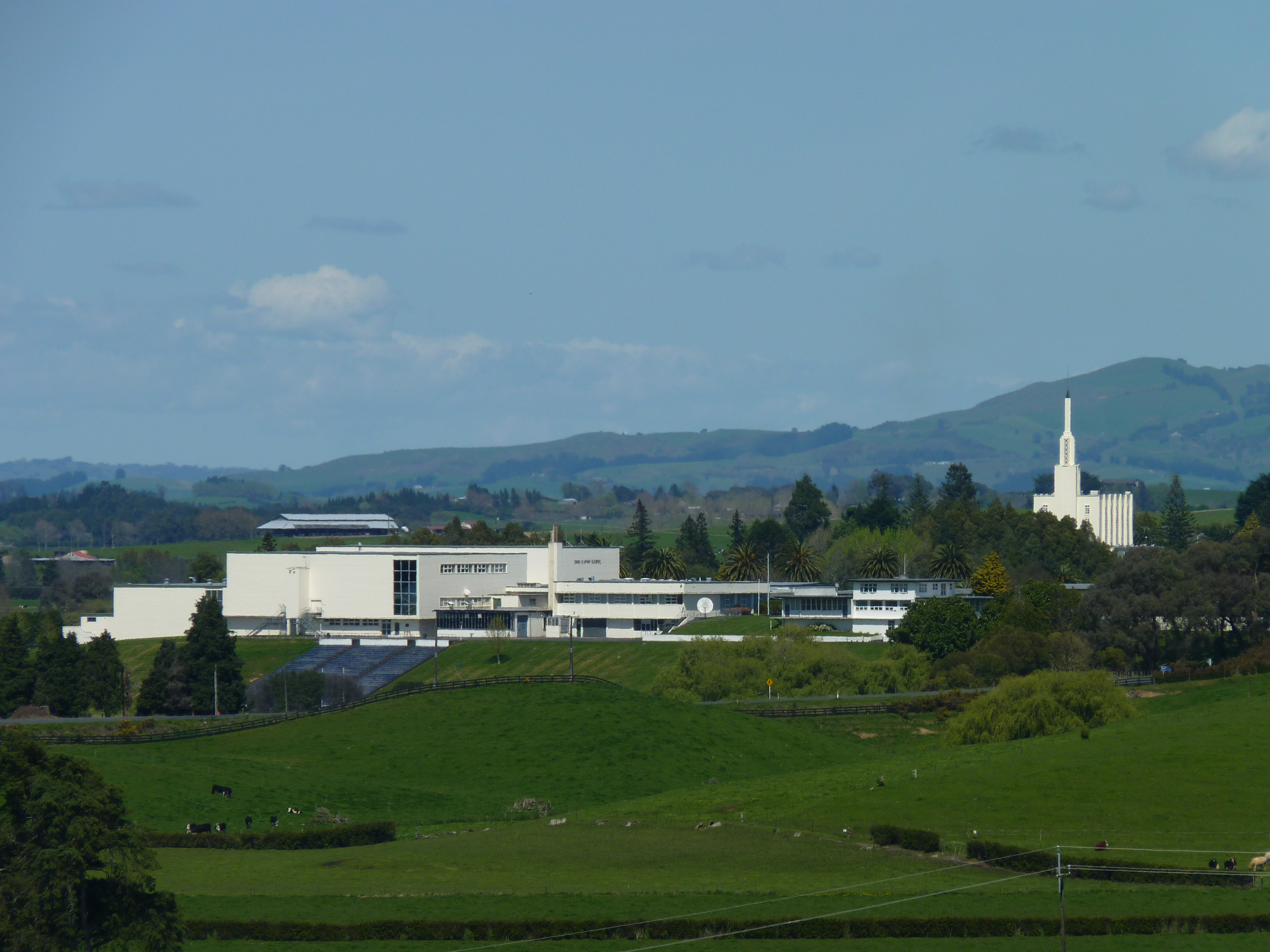
Church College of New Zealand with the New Zealand temple in the background

Years later, under the direction of the church and a local desire to reinstate a church-run school, the Church College of New Zealand was built and later dedicated on 24 April 1958. The college experienced great success, and on 11 January 1958, 18 American teachers were sent on the Mariposa to meet the needs of the area. This new college church emphasized the need to hire fully qualified teachers. In addition to involvement in formal education, the church also began to operate the seminary program in New Zealand. In 1968, the first seminary class was held in Kaikohe. In 1970, the seminary programme was officially instituted in the country. Church College closed in 2009 after the church decided to switch its educational work to developing counties.

=== Government relations ===
The church experienced various interactions with local New Zealand leaders. One of the first recorded incidents took place in 1902 when the mission president requested permission for various elders to perform weddings. The request was denied, and he took legal measures to re-appeal. He eventually received permission for two elders. In 1917, a temporary missionary ban was instituted. This ban was formed under the premise that American missionaries were allegedly trying to convince Māori to move to the United States with them.

== 1921 report of miraculous language comprehension ==
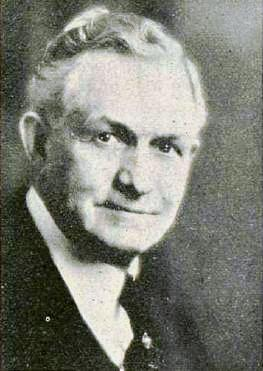
David O. McKay (Church president from 1951 to 1970) toured New Zealand in 1921.

In 1921, David O. McKay and Hugh J. Cannon began a Pacific-wide tour of the Church. McKay was the first apostle to visit New Zealand; celebrations were organised to commemorate the event. On 21 April 1921, they were received with various cultural performances, athletic competitions, and feasts of local cuisine. After the celebration concluded, a more spiritual meeting was held. Regarding his remarks, McKay felt strongly that he should deliver his address without translation. Multiple accounts state that during his address to the native Māori people, McKay was initially going to have a translator. When he went up to speak, however, he decided that a translation would inhibit the power of his message and decided to give the speech in English instead. Despite this language barrier, Māori people recall being able to understand his talk with complete clarity. When the message was eventually translated into Māori, many natives who were in attendance offered up correct translations of the speech from what they understood (regardless of the message being delivered in English). Members attributed their comprehension of the English speech to the gift of tongues.

== Stakes and Districts ==
| Stake/District | Organized | Mission | Temple |
|---|---|---|---|
| Auckland New Zealand Harbour Stake | 4 Nov 1973 | New Zealand Auckland | Auckland New Zealand |
| Auckland New Zealand Henderson Stake | 8 Nov 1981 | New Zealand Auckland | Auckland New Zealand |
| Auckland New Zealand Manukau Stake | 18 Sep 1977 | New Zealand Auckland | Auckland New Zealand |
| Auckland New Zealand Manurewa Stake | 5 May 1968 | New Zealand Hamilton | Auckland New Zealand |
| Auckland New Zealand Mt Roskill Stake | 18 May 1958 | New Zealand Auckland | Auckland New Zealand |
| Auckland New Zealand Otara Stake | 24 Feb 2013 | New Zealand Auckland | Auckland New Zealand |
| Auckland New Zealand Panmure Stake | 13 Feb 1994 | New Zealand Auckland | Auckland New Zealand |
| Auckland New Zealand Papakura Stake | 25 Aug 1996 | New Zealand Hamilton | Auckland New Zealand |
| Auckland New Zealand Papatoetoe Stake | 25 Aug 1996 | New Zealand Auckland | Auckland New Zealand |
| Auckland New Zealand Penrose Stake | 17 May 2015 | New Zealand Auckland | Auckland New Zealand |
| Auckland New Zealand Redoubt Stake | 24 Feb 2013 | New Zealand Hamilton | Auckland New Zealand |
| Auckland New Zealand Tamaki Stake | 13 Dec 1987 | New Zealand Auckland | Auckland New Zealand |
| Auckland New Zealand Waterview Stake | 9 Feb 1997 | New Zealand Auckland | Auckland New Zealand |
| Christchurch New Zealand Stake | 27 Aug 1978 | New Zealand Wellington | Hamilton New Zealand |
| Dunedin New Zealand Stake | 17 Apr 2016 | New Zealand Wellington | Hamilton New Zealand |
| Gisborne New Zealand Stake | 14 Feb 1980 | New Zealand Hamilton | Hamilton New Zealand |
| Hamilton New Zealand Stake | 13 Nov 1960 | New Zealand Hamilton | Hamilton New Zealand |
| Hamilton New Zealand Glenview Stake | 18 Dec 1994 | New Zealand Hamilton | Hamilton New Zealand |
| Hamilton New Zealand Rotokauri Stake | 25 Nov 2012 | New Zealand Hamilton | Hamilton New Zealand |
| Kaikohe New Zealand Stake | 19 Jan 1969 | New Zealand Auckland | Auckland New Zealand |
| Nelson New Zealand District | 9 Apr 1893 | New Zealand Wellington | Hamilton New Zealand |
| Palmerston North New Zealand Stake | 18 Mar 1979 | New Zealand Wellington | Hamilton New Zealand |
| Porirua New Zealand Stake | 26 Jan 1997 | New Zealand Wellington | Hamilton New Zealand |
| Rotorua New Zealand Stake | 27 Nov 1977 | New Zealand Hamilton | Hamilton New Zealand |
| Taranaki New Zealand District | 13 Sep 1992 | New Zealand Hamilton | Hamilton New Zealand |
| Tauranga New Zealand Stake | 9 Feb 1997 | New Zealand Hamilton | Hamilton New Zealand |
| Te Matau a Maui New Zealand Stake | 20 Nov 1960 | New Zealand Wellington | Hamilton New Zealand |
| Temple View New Zealand Stake | 19 Nov 1967 | New Zealand Hamilton | Hamilton New Zealand |
| Wellington and Hutt New Zealand Stake | 13 May 1965 | New Zealand Wellington | Hamilton New Zealand |
| Whangarei New Zealand Stake | 18 Dec 1994 | New Zealand Auckland | Auckland New Zealand |

== Missions ==
| Mission | Organized |
|---|---|
| New Zealand Auckland Mission | 1 Jan 1898 |
| New Zealand Hamilton Mission | 1 July 2013 |
| New Zealand Wellington Mission | 1 July 1976 |

== Temples ==
Temples in New Zealand
- = Operating
- = Under construction
- = Announced
- = Temporarily closed

Groundbreaking for the Hamilton New Zealand Temple was held on 21 December 1955. Following construction, a general public open house was held from 23 March to 13 April 1958, with the dedication by LDS Church president David O. McKay taking place seven days later on 20 April 1958. Other officials from Salt Lake City in attendance included Delbert L. Stapley, Gordon B. Hinckley, and Marion G. Romney.

During the church's October 2018 general conference, the intent to construct a temple in Auckland was announced. During the April 2022 general conference, the President announced the intention to construct a third New Zealand temple in Wellington.

| 11. Hamilton New Zealand Temple; Official website; News & images | |
| Location: Announced: Groundbreaking: Dedicated: Rededicated: Size: Style: | Hamilton, New Zealand; 17 February 1955 by David O. McKay; 21 December 1955 by Ariel Ballif, Wendell B. Mendenhall, and George R. Biesinger; 20 April 1958 by David O. McKay; 16 October 2022 by Dieter F. Uchtdorf; 45,251 sq ft (4,204.0 m^{2}) on a 86-acre (35 ha) site Modern contemporary, single spire - designed by Edward O. Anderson |
| 203. Auckland New Zealand Temple; Official website; News & images | |
| Location: Announced: Groundbreaking: Dedicated: Size: | Auckland, New Zealand; 7 October 2018 by Russell M. Nelson; 13 June 2020 by Ian S. Ardern; 13 April 2025 by Patrick Kearon; 45,456 sq ft (4,223.0 m^{2}) on a 11.37-acre (4.60 ha) site |
| 264. Wellington New Zealand Temple (Under construction); Official website; News & images | |
| Location: Announced: Groundbreaking: Size: | Porirua, New Zealand; 3 April 2022 by Russell M. Nelson; 2 August 2025 by Taniela B. Wakolo; 14,900 sq ft (1,380 m^{2}) on a 3.35-acre (1.36 ha) site |

== See also ==
- Religion in New Zealand
- The Church of Jesus Christ of Latter-day Saints in the Cook Islands
