= Whakaawi =

Māori woman of high birth

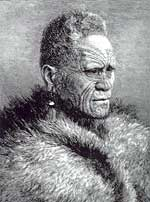
Whakaawi's son Tāwhiao

Whakaawi (Maori pronunciation: [ɸakaaːwi]) was a Māori woman of high birth in both the Ngāti Te Wehi tribe and Ngāti Mahuta tribe, who was the senior wife of the chief Pōtatau Te Wherowhero, who died in 1860. His other wives were Waiata, Raharaha and Ngāwaero.

Whakaawi gave birth to Tāwhiao at Orongokoekoea Pā, about 1825. Tāwhiao later became the second Māori King in 1860. Whakaawi's parents, Manu-whaka-aweawe (grandson of Te Wehi of Ngāti Te Wehi) and Parekairoro of Ngāti Wairere, raised him. It is possible that she was also the mother of Te Paea Tīaho.

King Mahuta, the third Māori King, reigning from 1894 to 1912, was Whakaawi's grandson.
