= Hamilton New Zealand Temple =

Latter-day Saints Church in Hamilton, New Zealand

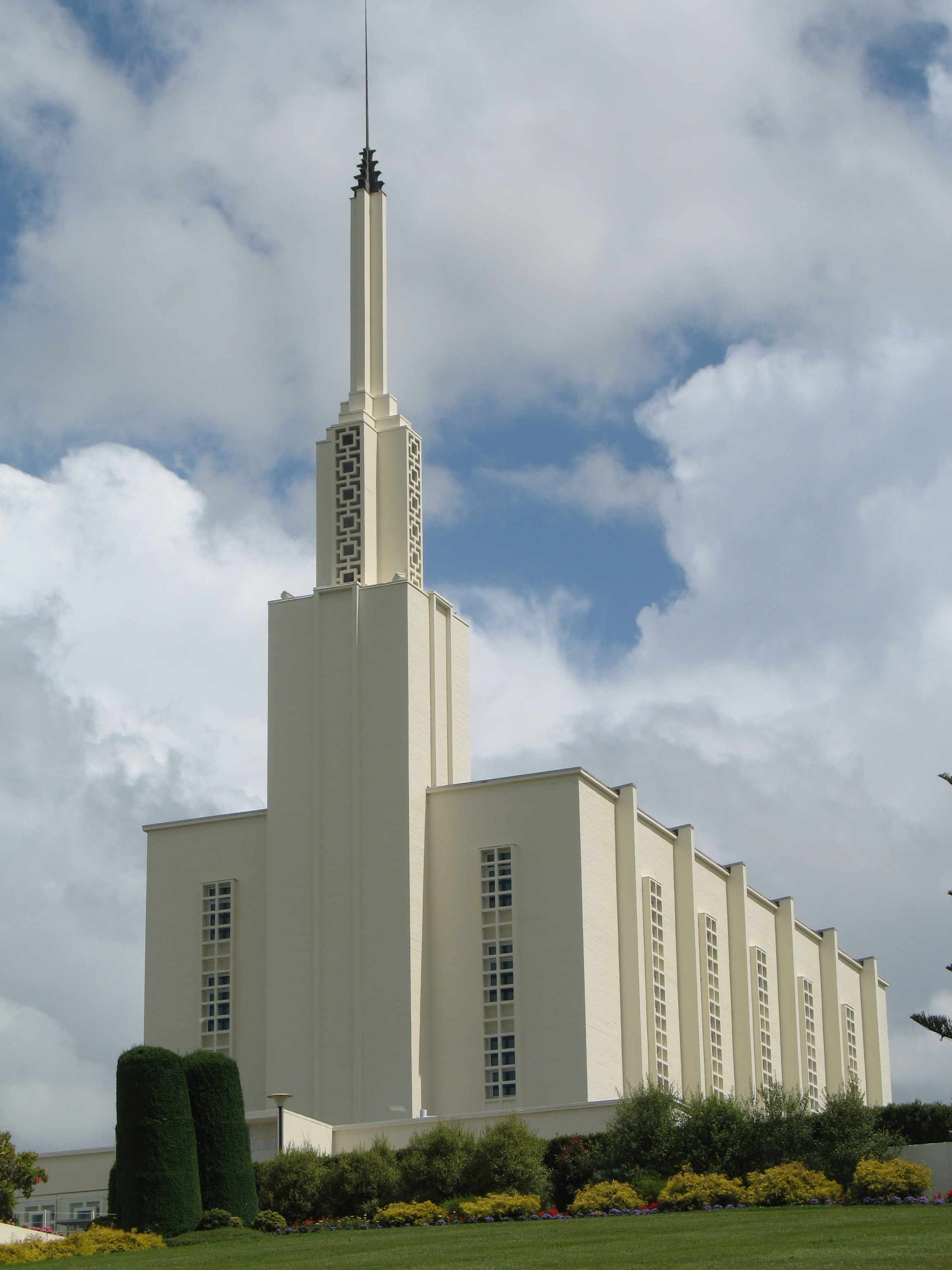
- Interactive map of Hamilton New Zealand Temple
- Number: 11
- Dedication: 20 April 1958, by David O. McKay
- Site: 86 acres (35 ha)
- Floor area: 45,251 ft^{2} (4,204.0 m^{2})
- Height: 157 ft (48 m)
- Official website • News & images

Church chronology
← Los Angeles California Temple	Hamilton New Zealand Temple	→ London England Temple

Additional information
- Announced: 17 February 1955, by David O. McKay
- Groundbreaking: 21 December 1955, by Ariel Ballif, Wendell B. Mendenhall, and George R. Biesinger
- Open house: 28 March – 19 April 1958; 26 August – 17 September 2022
- Rededicated: 16 October 2022, by Dieter F. Uchtdorf
- Current president: Tony Paul Osborne
- Designed by: Edward O. Anderson
- Location: Hamilton, New Zealand
- Coordinates: 37°49′34.62599″S 175°13′28.64280″E
- Exterior finish: Concrete block and white-painted structural steel
- Design: Modern contemporary, single spire
- Baptistries: 1
- Ordinance rooms: 2 (stationary)
- Sealing rooms: 8
- Clothing rental: Yes
- Visitors' center: Yes

The Hamilton New Zealand Temple (formerly known as the New Zealand Temple) is the 13th constructed and 11th operating temple of the Church of Jesus Christ of Latter-day Saints. The intent to build the temple was announced on 17 February 1955, by church president David O. McKay during a meeting of the First Presidency and Quorum of the Twelve Apostles. With its completion in 1958, it was the church's first temple in the Southern Hemisphere and the second built both in Polynesia and outside the United States and Canada, after the Laie Hawaii Temple. Located just outside Temple View in Hamilton, it was built with a modern single-spire design similar to the Bern Switzerland Temple. It is one of two temples currently operating in New Zealand, along with the one in Auckland.

The temple has modernist geometry and kōwhaiwhai patterning with design elements specific to Māori and other Polynesian cultures. This temple’s construction was overseen by George R. Beisinger, who supervised the church’s building program throughout the South Pacific, including the Church College of New Zealand (CCNZ), and other buildings in Temple View. A groundbreaking ceremony and site dedication were held on 21 December 1955, with the president of the New Zealand Mission, Ariel S. Ballif, conducting.

== History ==
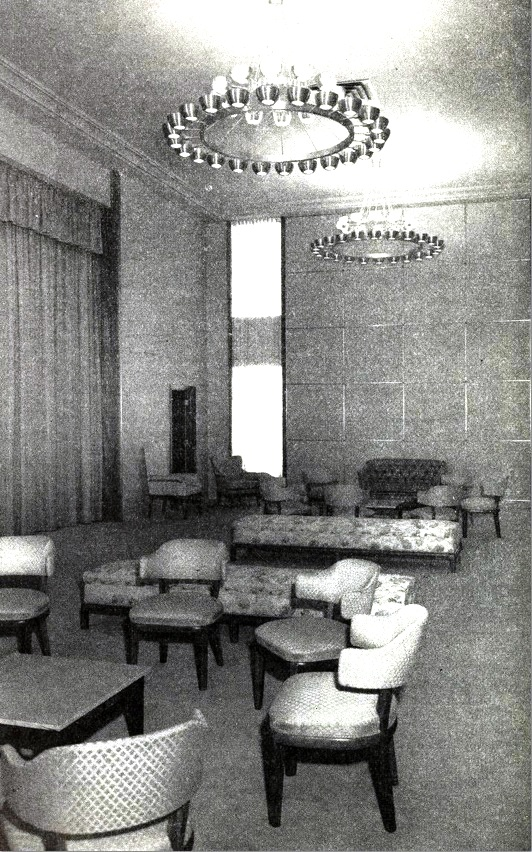
Celestial room (prior to dedication)

The temple was announced by David O. McKay on 17 February 1955. The site for the temple was originally identified by Wendell B. Mendenhall, who had been given the assignment by McKay to do so. When McKay later visited New Zealand, he determined the site was suitable to build a temple. The temple is on 86 acres (350,000 m^{2}), which also included CCNZ, formerly a secondary school for students aged twelve to eighteen. The temple is 44,212 square feet (4,107.4 m^{2}), has two instruction rooms used for the endowment ceremony, three sealing rooms, and a baptistry. The spire rises to a height of 157 feet (48 m). The temple was built entirely by church labour missionaries who volunteered all their time. Local members supported these workers with money, food, and lodging.

A groundbreaking ceremony took place on 21 December 1955, marking the commencement of construction. This ceremony was conducted by Ariel S. Ballif and attended by local church members and community leaders. Hugh B. Brown, then an Assistant to the Quorum of the Twelve Apostles, placed the ceremonial cornerstone of the temple on 22 December 1956.

During construction, the project faced various challenges, including material shortages due to World War II. Excessive rain also caused flooding and slowed progress. Despite these challenges, the labour missionaries were able to complete the temple on time.

The temple was open for public tours for 23 days prior to the dedication, during which about 112,500 people toured the building. The New Zealand Temple was dedicated by David O. McKay on 20 April 1958. The temple serves Latter-day Saints in New Zealand and New Caledonia. According to local legends, the Māori King Tāwhiao accurately predicted the site of the temple before his death in 1894.

== Design and architecture ==
The building has aspects of Māori culture integrated with traditional Latter-day Saint temple designs. Without ever visiting New Zealand, the temple’s architectural work, designed by Edward O. Anderson, reflects both the cultural heritage of New Zealand and its spiritual significance to the church.

The temple is on an 86.4-acre plot on top of a green hill, and the landscaping has large lawns, gardens, and concrete masonry pavers. A steel and masonry fencing outlines the site perimeter.

The structure is three stories tall, constructed with painted concrete and an acid-etched glazing. The exterior has a single spire and uses a modern design. The blocks used to build the temple were manufactured on site by the labour missionaries. The design uses elements that reflect both the local culture and church symbolism.

Many features of the interior design were designed by NWL architects. The interior has murals, glass and crystal chandeliers, and gold detailing designed to create a spiritually uplifting environment.

The temple features carpeting in simple loop patterns made of nylon, dyed in a soft green shade. This carpeting is supplied from a company in California. In specific areas, the carpets are nylon-cut pile broadloom in a soft cream hue. Wool area rugs are used in the lobby and bride’s room. The flooring throughout the building is composed of Butter Silk, a light yellowish cream limestone quarried in Palestine.

During the renovation, historic murals in the baptistry and celestial room were restored. The baptistry mural, painted by Paul Forster in 1957, and the celestial room mural by Dale Jolley in 1993, were both restored. These murals use patterns inspired by local Māori designs.

The lighting fixtures use a blend of metal, opal glass, or crystal, designed in a clean mid-century style. The millwork and casework in Victorian Oak with a slightly tinted stain were crafted and installed by a local company in Hamilton. Door hardware patterns feature a stylised silver fern.

Most walls are covered with durable vinyl, with simple textures in creamy and gold colours. In the instruction rooms, the walls have a stylised fern-like pattern inspired by local Māori designs. These wall coverings are standard products from mills in the United States. The celestial room's walls have a historic mural, which was not impacted during the renovation.

The ceilings are predominantly painted gypsum board on steel framing, reflecting the historicity of the original temple. Decorative paint patterns or simple gold linework with plaster moldings are present around the perimeter. The temple includes two ordinance rooms, five sealing rooms, and a baptistry.

The design has symbolic elements representing the Bible and the Book of Mormon, to provide church members with spiritual meaning of its appearance and function. These symbols include the central spire and baptismal font. The baptismal font is on the back of twelve oxen, symbolising the twelve tribes of Israel. The baptismal font is an original feature of the temple. It was made in Switzerland using molds from the Swiss Temple.

== Renovations ==
On 19 January 2018, the church announced that in July 2018, the temple would close for renovations that were anticipated to be completed in 2021.

Renovations focused on key areas, including seismic strengthening and mechanical, plumbing, and electrical upgrades. A new roof was installed and an accessible entrance to the baptistry was constructed. The landscaping and parking lot were also renovated. These changes ensure compliance with contemporary building standards and accommodate the evolving needs of the church and its members.

Although the exterior painted concrete masonry remained unchanged, the interior layout and furnishings were changed. The reconfiguration provides better flow and efficiency. Many of the historic murals were restored. The new designs reflect the craftsmanship of its original builders and the heritage of the Māori culture. Other features include oak millwork from Hamilton, New Zealand craftspeople and decorative painting derived from local Māori patterns.

A public open house was held from 26 August to 17 September 2022 (excluding Sundays), during which more than 55,000 guests toured the renovated temple.

The temple was rededicated on 16 October 2022 by Dieter F. Uchtdorf.

== Cultural and community impact ==
The temple and its surrounding grounds are often a gathering place for various community events, including the Temple View Christmas Lights. The temple grounds include many lights, accompanied by choirs singing Christmas hymns.

In response to the growing need for educational opportunities, the church established two schools in New Zealand during the 20th century. The Māori Agricultural College near Hastings was operational from 1913 until 1931 when it was destroyed by an earthquake. Following World War II, plans were made to build another school near Hamilton. Due to limited building materials and skilled labor, church headquarters in Salt Lake City, Utah, USA, offered assistance, providing materials, equipment, and experienced construction managers. New Zealand Latter-day Saints, approximately 12,000 at the time, were asked to contribute volunteer labor and supplies to support the project.

Construction of CCNZ began in 1950, coinciding with a visit from church president David O. McKay to countries in the South Pacific. During his visit to the Hamilton construction site, McKay identified a hill adjacent to the college as the ideal location for a temple to serve the growing Latter-day Saint population in the region. Subsequently, at a national conference, 4,000 church members expressed support for adding a temple to the ongoing construction project. McKay returned to New Zealand in 1958 to dedicate the temple.

In 2019, Russell M. Nelson announced the location for a new temple in Auckland — the second temple in the country. In April 2022, Nelson announced a new temple in Wellington—the third temple in the country.

== Presidents ==
Notable presidents of the Hamilton New Zealand Temple include Glen L. Rudd (1984–87), Douglas J. Martin (1992–95), and Sidney M. Going (2013–2016). As of 2023 Lindsay T. Dil was the president.

== Admittance ==
Prior to its dedication in 1958, a public open house was held, allowing individuals of all faiths to see its architecture and learn about the church's practices and beliefs. Temples are a central place of worship and spiritual ceremonies for church members.

Following renovations, the church announced on 11 April 2022, that a public open house would be held from 26 August to 17 September 2022 (excluding Sundays). The temple was rededicated on 16 October 2022 by Dieter F. Uchtdorf.

Like all the church's temples, it is not used for Sunday worship services. To members of the church, temples are regarded as sacred houses of the Lord. Once dedicated, only church members with a current temple recommend can enter for worship.

== See also ==
- List of temples of The Church of Jesus Christ of Latter-day Saints
- List of temples of The Church of Jesus Christ of Latter-day Saints by geographic region
- Comparison of temples of The Church of Jesus Christ of Latter-day Saints
- Temple architecture (Latter-day Saints)
- The Church of Jesus Christ of Latter-day Saints in New Zealand
Temples in New Zealand
- = Operating
- = Under construction
- = Announced
- = Temporarily Closed
