= Tāwhiao =

Leader of the Waikato tribes and second Māori King (c. 1822–1894)

Matutaera Tāwhiao
- Te Kīngi Māori
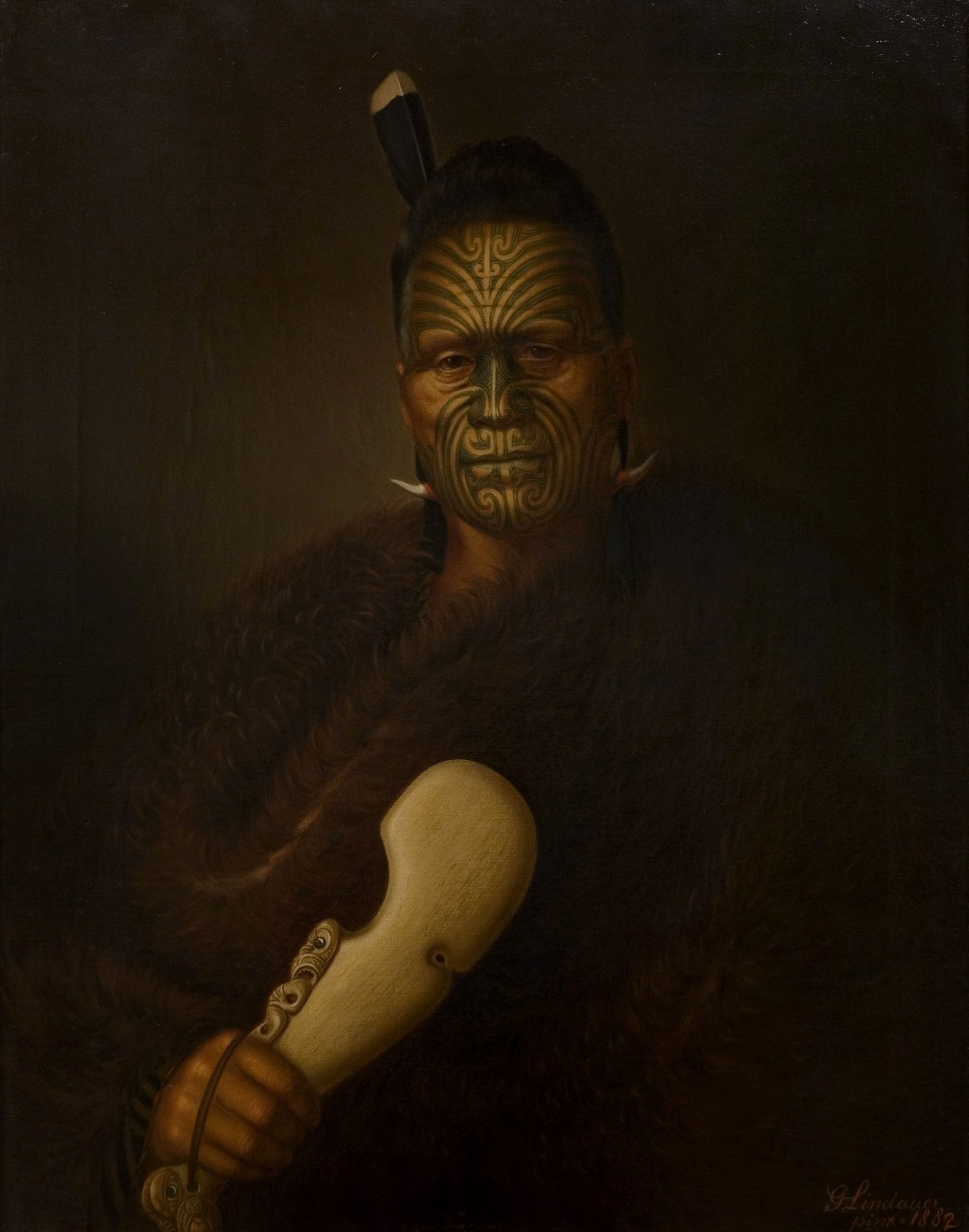
- The king painted by Gottfried Lindauer in 1882

Māori King
- Tenure: 25 June 1860 – 26 August 1894
- Coronation: 5 July 1894
- Predecessor: Pōtatau Te Wherowhero
- Successor: Mahuta Tāwhiao

Ariki of Te Rohe Pōtae
- Tenure: 5 April 1864 – 11 July 1881
- Predecessor: Position established
- Successor: Position abolished
- Born: Tūkaroto Pōtatau Te Wherowhero c. 1822; Orongokoekoea Pā, Te Takiwā o Waikato Tainui, Aotearoa
- Died: 26 August 1894 (aged 71–72); Ngāruawāhia, New Zealand
- Burial: Mount Taupiri
- Makau Ariki: Rangiaho; Hera; Aotea
Names
- Tūkaroto Matutaera Pōtatau Te Wherowhero Tāwhiao
Regnal name
- Tūkaroto Matutaera Pōtatau Te Wherowhero Tāwhiao
- House: Ngāti Mahuta
- Father: Pōtatau Te Wherowhero
- Mother: Whakaawi
- Religion: Pai Mārire

Kīngi Tāwhiao (Tūkaroto Matutaera Pōtatau Te Wherowhero Tāwhiao, Māori: [taːɸiao tʉːkaɾɔtɔ matʉtaeɾa pɔːtatau tɛ ɸɛɾɔɸɛɾɔ]; c. 1822 – 26 August 1894), (Note: This article uses macrons as part of standardised Māori spelling.) known initially as Matutaera, reigned as the Māori King from 1860 until his death. After his flight to the King Country, Tāwhiao was also Paramount Chief of Te Rohe Pōtae for 17 years, until 1881. A rangatira, and a religious figure – a tohunga ariki – Tāwhiao amassed power and authority during a time of momentous change, to become de facto leader of the Waikato tribes. He was a member of the Ngati Mahuta hapū and the kāhui ariki, the Kīngitanga royal family.

The son of kīngi Pōtatau te Wherowhero, Tāwhiao was elected the second Māori King after his father's death in 1860. Unlike his unenthusiastic father, Tāwhiao embraced the kingship, and responded immediately to the challenge of ongoing Raukawa and Tainui support for Te Āti Awa during the First Taranaki War. In 1863, Tāwhiao was baptised into the Pai Mārire faith, taking his regnal name, before leading the response to the invasion of the Waikato. After the Kīngitanga suffered a heavy defeat at the Battle of Rangiriri and war crimes at the trading centre of Rangiaowhia, Tāwhiao led the exodus of Tainui to the land of Ngāti Maniapoto, establishing a secessionist state called Te Rohe Pōtae (the King Country). Warning all Europeans that they risked death if they crossed the border, he governed Te Rohe Pōtae as an independent state for almost twenty years. Tāwhiao's power began to decline significantly in the 1880s, as his relations with Raukawa ki Ngāti Maniapoto deteriorated. He formally sued for peace with George Grey at Pirongia on 11 July 1881, allowing the construction of the North Island Main Trunk railway line, which first opened the King Country up to the outside world. Attempts by Tāwhiao to regain personal sovereignty or establish co-governance failed and the Kīngitanga began to lose its supporters. The king died suddenly in August 1894, and was succeeded by his son Mahuta Tāwhiao.

Tāwhiao's legacy includes building the kingitanga from a union of mid-Northern tribes into "one of New Zealand’s most enduring political institutions," becoming a powerful adversary of the Crown that endured even after the exodus into the King Country and the eventual loss of its sovereignty. He is credited with establishing several key Kīngitanga institutions, including Te Whakakitenga, the bicameral legislature of Waikato Tainui, and the annual Poukai conference, as well as the initial Kīngitanga Bank, which collapsed, and then the successful Bank of Aotearoa. Tāwhiao has also been the subject of controversy, in connection with the forfeiture of the Kīngitanga Bank, and his conversion to Mormonism.

== Early life and name ==
Tūkaroto Pōtatau Te Wherowhero (Tainui orthonography: Tuukaroto Pootatau Te Wherowhero) was born around 1822 at Ngāruawāhia. His father, Te Wherowhero, was arguably the Paramount Chief of the Waikato people, and his mother, Whakaawi, was Te Wherowhero's senior wife. Te Wherowhero the younger was raised through whāngai by his mother's parents, making him distant from his father. He was named Tūkāroto in commemoration of his father's stand at the siege of Mātakitaki pā in May 1822 against Ngāpuhi. After the Waikato were defeated by musket-armed Ngāpuhi led by Hongi Hika in a battle at Matakitaki (Pirongia) in 1822, they retreated to Orongokoekoea Pā, in what is now the King Country, and lived there for several years. Tāwhiao was born at Orongokoekoea in about 1825 and was named Tūkaroto to commemorate, it is said, his father's stand at Matakitaki.

Tāwhiao's name changed throughout his life. Initially known as Tūkaroto, he was later baptised Matutaera (Methuselah) by Anglican missionary Robert Burrows, a name he would repudiate in 1867. Te Ua Haumēne, the Hauhau prophet and founder of the Pai Mārire faith, sought counsel with the king in the 1860s. After the invasion of the Waikato in 1863, Matutaera travelled to Te Namu pā in Ōpunake to meet him. There, Matutaera was baptised into the Pai Mārire faith, taking the name Tāwhiao, meaning "encircle the world".

== Biography ==
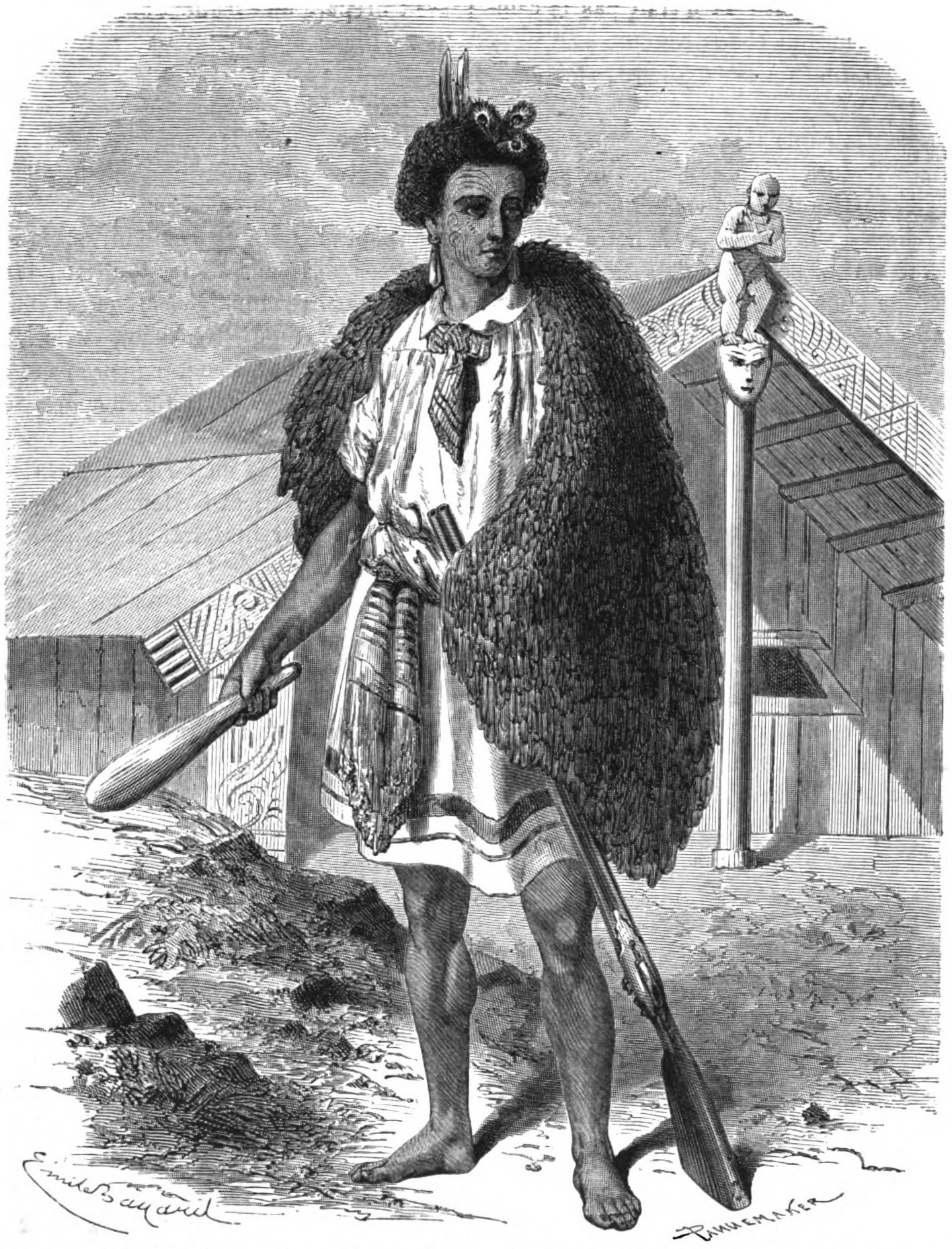
Tāwhiao (then Matutaera) as a young man

In 1858 Tāwhiao's father, Pōtatau Te Wherowhero, was installed as the first Māori King (taking the name Pōtatau), his purpose being to promote unity among the Māori people in the face of Pākehā encroachment. Pōtatau was an unwilling ruler, and acquiesced to accept the crown as merely a transitional holder. Several rūnanga were held to discuss the proposal for the elderly Te Wherowhero to ascend to the Kingitanga. One such hui was an 1857 meeting known as Te Puna o te Roimata (the wellspring of tears), at Haurua, south of Ōtorohanga, hosted by Tainui kin Ngāti Maniapoto. Tanirau, a powerful Ngāti Maniapoto chief, announced the iwi's at-large decision to support Pōtatau as king. Pōtatau replied, ‘E Tā, kua tō te rā’ (O sir, the sun is about to set), a proverb commenting on his advanced age and poor health, implying he had not much longer to live. Tanirau replied, ‘E tō ana i te ahiahi, e ara ana i te ata, e tū koe he Kīngi’ (it sets in the evening to rise again in the morning; thou art raised up a king). This referred to the possibility of introducing hereditary rule to the monarchy; Tanirau later espoused support for Tāwhiao (then known as Matutaera) or his siblings to succeed Pōtatau Te Wherowhero upon the latter's death. Pōtatau replied, ‘E pai ana’ (it is good), and ascended to the kingship, and to Waikato the role of kaitiaki of the Kīngitanga. The Kīngitanga remains a hereditary monarchy, and is yet to leave the hands of Waikato Tainui.

When Pōtatau died in 1860, Tāwhiao, his sister Te Paea Tiaho, and Wiremu Tamihana Tarapipipi of Ngāti Hauā were candidates to succeed him. Tāwhiao was chosen and reigned for thirty-four years during one of the most difficult and discouraging periods of Māori history. During this period there were two governments de jure; English law and governance prevailed within the British settlements and Māori custom over the rest of the country, although the influence of the King was largely confined to the Waikato and even there chiefs such as Rewi Maniapoto only cooperated with the king when it suited them. However the Pākehā population was increasing rapidly while the Māori population was unknown as there was no reliable census of Maori and Pākehā / Maori for 80 years. Because Maori separated themselves from Pākehā, many believed, wrongly, that the Maori population was declining rapidly. This was also the period when British industrial, trade and political power was at its height. The presence of an independent native state in the central North Island was officially ignored by the government until it developed the potential to undermine the colonial government's sovereignty.

After Tāwhiao converted to the Pai Mārire faith in early 1863, he and Te Ua Haumene established Te Kīwai o te Kete, the military pact forged between Taranaki and Tainui Māori during the New Zealand Wars. The two iwi had recently allied in 1860, during the First Taranaki War, when Kingitanga forces under the command of Epiha Tokohihi had come to the aid of Taranaki leader Wiremu Kīngi Te Rangitāke. Pōtatau Te Wherowhero had died in June 1860, making the First Taranaki War Tāwhiao's first major challenge. Tāwhiao supported the Kīngitanga's uniting principle of opposition to the sale of Māori land, to prevent the spread of British sovereignty, but as a pacifist he was divided over how to respond. Both Wiremu Kīngi and the Colonial Government had made repeated diplomatic approaches to Pōtatau to ask him for military and diplomatic support, but by early May Pōtatau seemed to have decided to offer at least token support to Taranaki Māori, sending a Kingite war party to the district under the control of war chief Epiha Tokohihi. Tāwhiao eventually opted to maintain this policy.

== Invasion of the Waikato ==
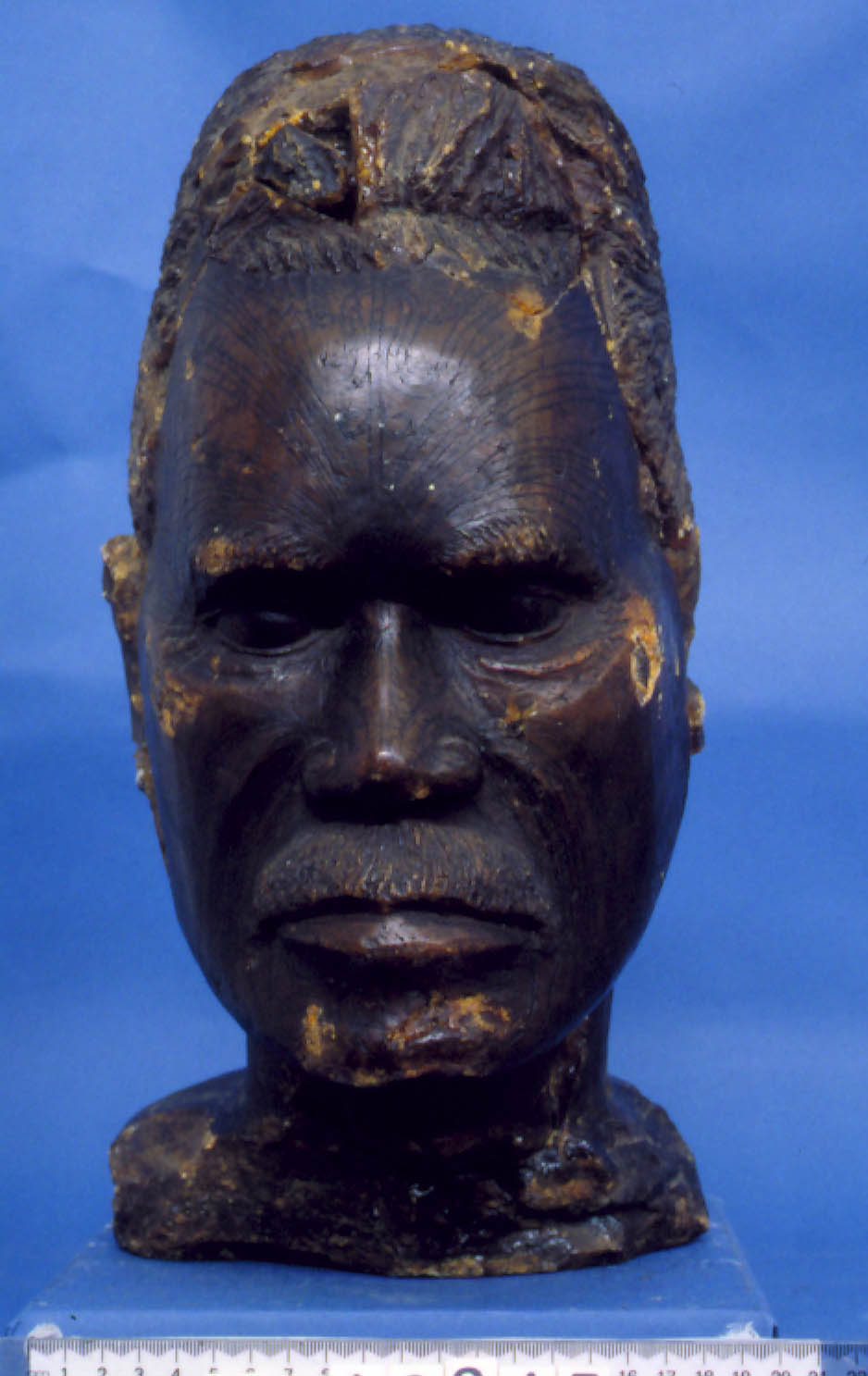
Kauri gum bust of Tāwhiao made during the New Zealand Wars

In 1863, after Maniapoto warriors ambushed and killed British soldiers escorting a detained British soldier along the beach to New Plymouth to stand trial, the Government attacked the Kingitanga in Waikato, to suppress the King movement and remove a supposed threat to neighbouring Auckland. Having succeeded the inefficient Thomas Gore Browne as Governor, George Grey had convinced the government of a supposed invasion of Auckland by Waikato Tainui. According to Browne, in response to his belligerence in the First Taranaki War, Kingite leaders formed plans to launch a raid on Auckland on 1 September and burn the town and slaughter most of its residents. This has since been dismissed by such historians as James Belich as being fear-mongering from Browne in order to try and gain military support. Browne's invasion plan was suspended when he was replaced by Grey in September that year, and the Kingites in turn abandoned their plan for their uprising. Grey had held a grudge against the Kīngitanga since falling out with Tāwhiao's father, his old friend Pōtatau Te Wherowhero, with whom he had once had a "wonderful relationship", according to historian Rahui Papa. According to Brad Totorewa, Grey had begged Te Wherowhero to protect Auckland from Ngāpuhi, but Te Wherowhero had refused; after a meeting in which Grey demanded Te Wherowhero to relinquish his power or face seven years of war, Te Wherowhero had threatened to eat him.

With his longstanding desire to destroy the Kingitanga in mind, on 9 July 1863 Grey issued a new ultimatum, ordering that all Māori living between Auckland and the Waikato take an oath of allegiance to Queen Victoria or be expelled south of the river. As many young men retreated into the bush with their weapons, officials began seizing others—including the ill and aged—who declined to swear the oath, imprisoning them without charge. Two days later Grey issued a proclamation directed to the "Chiefs of Waikato" as opposed to Tāwhiao in particular, which read:

Europeans living quietly on their own lands in Waikato have been driven away; their property has been plundered; their wives and children have been taken from them. By the instigation of some of you, officers and soldiers were murdered at Taranaki. Others of you have since expressed approval of these murders ... You are now assembling in armed bands; you are constantly threatening to come down the river to ravage the Settlement of Auckland and to murder peaceable settlers. Some of you offered a safe passage through your territories to armed parties contemplating such outrages ... Those who remain peaceably at their own villages in Waikato, or move into such districts as may be pointed out by the Government, will be protected in their persons, property, and land. Those who wage war against Her Majesty, or remain in arms, threatening the lives of Her peaceable subjects, must take the consequences of their acts, and they must understand that they will forfeit the right to the possession of their lands guaranteed to them by the Treaty of Waitangi.

Within a day—before the proclamation had even reached the Tāwhiao—Grey ordered the invasion of Tāwhiao's territory. Though Grey claimed it was a defensive action, historian B. J. Dalton has claimed Grey's reports to London had been "a deliberate and transparent falsehood" and that the invasion was an act of "calculated aggression". According to historian Vincent O'Malley, there was a total of 18,000 troops involved in the invasion of the Waikato, who had the advantage of a ready supply of food and ammunition. The campaign lasted for nine months, from July 1863 to April 1864. The invasion was aimed at crushing Kingite power (which European settlers saw as a threat to colonial authority) and also at driving Waikato Māori from their territory in readiness for occupation and settlement by European colonists.

Tāwhiao's response was to abandon his pacifism and fight. He relied on his junior chiefs to help sustain the population and engineer defences and palisades to protect pā and areas of economic importance, such as flour mills. Te Wharepu, a leading Waikato chief, was the mastermind behind the defences of Rangiriri, a one kilometre-long system of deep trenches and high parapets that ran between the Waikato River and Lake Waikare. Despite this, the Battle of Rangiriri of 20–21 November 1863 was lost by the Waikato Māori, at a higher cost to both sides than any other single engagement of the New Zealand Wars. Further atrocities committed at Rangiaowhia made the situation even more desperate for Tāwhiao's leadership.

The Battle of Ōrākau was a turning point, and arguably the Waikato War's decisive engagement, which "signified the end of one form of resistance and the beginning of another". The battle was commanded by Tāwhiao, Wiremu Tamihana, and Rewi Maniopoto between 31 March and 2 April 1864, against the forces of Duncan Cameron. According to Michael Belgrave, when Cameron offered the forces of Tāwhiao and Rewi Manipoto surrender, the defenders replied, ‘E hoa, ka whawhai tonu ahau ki a koe, ake, ake!’ (‘Friend, I shall fight against you for ever, for ever!’). When the women and children were offered safe passage, a voice from the pā called out, "Ki te mate nga tane, me mate ano nga wahine me nga tamariki" ("If the men die, the women and children must die as well"). Belgrave says that although their escape "was marked by rape and the brutal killing of the surrendered", the bravery of the last defenders of Ōrākau played no part in the myth that emerged.

Described as "Rewi's Last Stand", the battle was remembered by Pākehā historians in the coming decades as the "dying act of a doomed people pitted against.. a superior European world". According to Belgrave, George Grey used the events at Ōrākau to describe Māori resistance as "an act of unconquerable courage upon the part of . . . adversaries, who fell before superior numbers and weapons – an act which the future inhabitants of New Zealand will strive to imitate, but can never surpass". Belgrave has argued that this undermines the resilience of Waikato Tainui, as evident by their exodus to the King Country.

=== Surrender and flight ===
After the defeat of the Kīngitanga at Ōrākau, Cameron prepared to assault Wiremu Tamihana's pā, Te Tiki o te Ihingarangi, about 25 km northeast of Ōrākau near modern-day Lake Karapiro, where Tāwhiao had escaped to. The pā formed part of a long line of pā the Kingites called aukati, or boundary. Cameron assessed the pā as too strong to assault and incapable of outflanking. On 2 April he settled his troops in front of it, and prepared to shell it. On 5 April, the pā's inhabitants fled, and began their long exodus southeast to Ngāti Maniapoto whenua - the King Country.

Killing thousands and forcing their exile, the invasion of the Waikato was devastating for the Kīngitanga. According to Vincent O'Malley, "it is clear that Waikato Māori suffered horrendous losses... overall estimates for those killed and wounded during the Waikato War have ranged from about 500 to 2,000 casualties on the Kīngitanga side". O'Malley has compared the losses for Waikato to the heavy casualties of New Zealand soldiers during the First World War, in which 5.8% of the national population of just over 1 million served, 1.7% of whom were killed. O'Malley says that although "this staggering level of carnage is rightly remembered today, [it] may have been eclipsed by the casualty rate suffered by Waikato Māori in 1863 and 1864", in which he estimates 7.7 per cent of their total population fought and just under 4 per cent were killed. The conquered land was confiscated, altogether about a million acres (4,000 km^{2}).

== Te Rohe Pōtae ==
Tāwhiao and his people had moved southwards, into the territory of the Ngāti Maniapoto, the area of New Zealand that is still known as the King Country. He established Te Rohe Pōtae, a secessionist independent state which he and other rangatira governed for 20 years. This name translates as "Area of the Hat", and is said to have originated when Tāwhiao put his white top hat on a large map of the North Island and declared that all land covered by the hat would be under his mana (or authority).

According to Massey University professor Michael Belgrave, the Rohe Pōtae also became "the refuge for Māori who had taken up armed resistance to the Crown". A notable example of this was Te Kooti, who resided under the protection of Tāwhiao from 1872. According to Belgrave: "for years, [Tawhiao] sat audaciously beyond the legal authority of the Queen and the vengeance of those communities he had ravaged on the East Coast... the establishment of the Rohe Pōtae, in the aftermath of the war, created an independent constitutional entity with its own borders and its own centralised authority. Belgrave has compared the invasion of the Waikato to the American Civil War, as it led to the creation of an "independent breakaway state". According to Belgrave, "between the battle of Ōrākau and the mid-1880s, the Rohe Pōtae remained an independent and unified state, but that unity was precarious", owing to the disunity between the iwi of Tainui and the increased resentment of monarchical rule.

For the next twenty years Tāwhiao lived an itinerant lifestyle, travelling among his people in Taranaki and Maniapoto settlements reminding them that war always had its price and the price was always higher than expected. He considered himself the anointed leader of a chosen people wandering in the wilderness. But he also predicted that the Māori people would find justice and restitution for the wrongs they had suffered. He preached that Kingites should keep separate from Pākehā. He was strongly against Maori children going to school to get an education. As a result, when the railway went through Kingite territory Kingites were only able to get unskilled jobs such as bush clearing. This strong anti education stance started a Kingite tradition that led to increasing isolation and lower standard of living than Maori experienced elsewhere in New Zealand. It was not until after the turn of the century that Kingites were finally persuaded to abandon their hatred of formal education in schools.

Tāwhiao was now leader of his own secessionist kingdom, but was utterly isolated. According to Belgrave "the Rohe Pōtae was an enclosed territory surrounded by land with a Crown title,". This stretched from the Aotea Harbour east to the boundary where the land confiscation in the Waikato had occurred, and then "along the boundaries of the Maungatautari and Pātetere blocks, to the Waipapa stream then south to Taupō. After that the line crossed the middle of the lake and ran to the top of the Kaimanawa range, looped through the central plateau between Ruapehu and Ngāruahoe, and then crossed the Whanganui River at Kirikau and headed west until it joined the Taranaki confiscation block." To the west was Kāwhia, Te Rohe Pōtae's major port, and to the east were Te Arawa, who were loyal to the British crown. The kūpapa among their highest ranks had prevented reinforcements from allies on the East Cape coming to support Tāwhiao during the invasion of the Waikato. To the south was the Taranaki confiscation and a largely ambivalent assortment of Māori living in Whanganui, who despite the great friendship Tāwhiao had professed as existing between the Waikato and Taranaki, were divided on supporting the king. The Rohe Pōtae, although an untouchable secessionist state, remained outflanked on all sides. The Kīngitanga was soon facing threats from the renegade chiefs it was sheltering from the Crown, including Tītokowaru and Te Kooti, who "directly threatened the King’s authority to speak for dissident Māori throughout the country".

In 1878, the New Zealand Government with George Grey as Premier approached Tāwhiao with the proposal that some of their Waikato land would be restored to them if they would accept the integration of the King Country with the rest of New Zealand. On the advice of his council Tāwhiao rejected the offer. However it was accepted three years later in a modified form.

The decline of the king's power was hastened by the lessening generosity of Ngāti Maniopoto in hosting the Kīngitanga; the iwi were increasingly impatient for Tāwhiao to return to the Waikato homeland. After his symbolic declaration of peace in July 1881, Tawhiao began to lose his authority, and after 1882, the King "could no longer exercise a unifying role, and tribes were forced to find another constitutional basis for maintaining their independent authority". Although they would still have control over their whenua until at least 1886, Manipoto began to experience challenges in maintaining order and making decisions with Tāwhiao gone. According to Belgrave, despite the efforts of a willing Ngāti Maniapoto leadership, it became extremely difficult and at times impossible for them and other leaders, "to maintain a coherent constitutional entity within the aukati", Achieving a degree of consensus among Ngāti Maniapoto alone was apparently a "tortuous process", making it easier for Native Minister John Bruce to eye up the previously restricted territory.

== Later reign ==
=== Visit to the United Kingdom ===
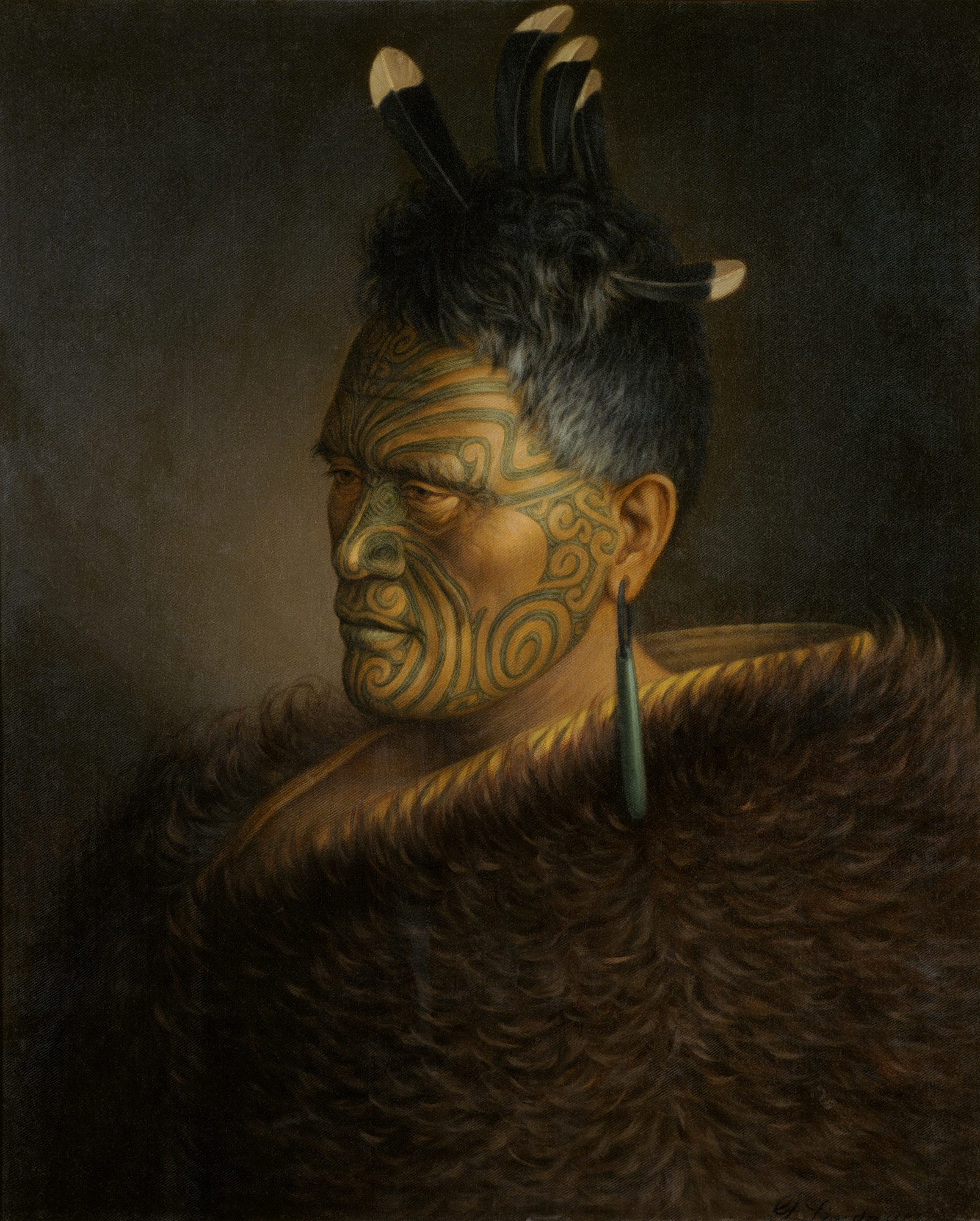
King Tawhiao as depicted by Gottfried Lindauer in later life

In the early 1880s there had already been two failed petitions taken to the British government by Maori. By 1884, there were only 1,000 kingite supporters left, according to Claudia Orange. King Tāwhiao went around the North Island collecting money. This netted 3,000 pounds. He withdrew all the funds that had been deposited in the Kingitanga Bank by the many Maori land sellers, and travelled to London to see Queen Victoria with Western Maori MP Wiremu Te Wheoro to lead a deputation with a petition to the Crown to try to persuade her to honour the treaty between their peoples. Tāwhiao's petition was different from the previous failed ones. He asked for nothing less than the complete, separate, Maori self-government, drawing on Section 71 of the New Zealand Constitution Act 1852. Although Tāwhiao saw the queen as no more than "a remote and benign figure of little relevance" – as had been the Kingitanga's position since its establishment – he believed she could shepherd in respect for the Treaty of Waitangi.

The journey was aided by Governor George Grey, who met with Tāwhiao at a summit on Kawau Island beforehand. He convinced the king and his fellow rangatira Rewi Maniapoto and Te Whēoro to sign a pledge to act with the “propriety and dignity which became his position”. This was a veiled reference to Tāwhiao's alcoholism; Grey was "determined to limit the likelihood of a drunk monarch turning up at a royal garden party", according to The Spinoff. This was apparently successful, and during his stay Tāwhiao drank ginger ale instead.

Despite his best attempts at temperance, however, Victoria refused to grant him an audience. Tāwhiao did, however, wrangle a meeting with Lord Derby, Secretary of State for the Colonies, who said the question of Māori self-determination was an issue for the New Zealand government to resolve internally. Returning to New Zealand, the premier, Robert Stout, insisted that all events happening prior to 1863 were the responsibility of the Imperial Government. The Maori bank depositors, finding their money gone, raided the bank, looking for their cash and finding none, burnt it down in 1884. Thoroughly disillusioned, Tāwhiao tried various initiatives to promote the independence and welfare of his people but he had been effectively marginalized. His problems were not solely due to the attitude of the New Zealand government. The King Movement had never represented all the Māori people and as it lost its mana or standing they became even more disunited.

Undeterred, Tāwhiao resolved to establish a new bank, the Bank of Aotearoa (Te Peeke o Aotearoa), at Parawera in 1886. Quickly expanding to Maungatatauri and Maungakawa. Cheques were issued by customers, but the bank issued no banknotes nor minted coins. It provided banking and monetary services to Māori (particularly those within the King Country). Sample banknotes bore the text "E whaimana ana tenei moni ki nga tangata katoa" (this money is valid for all people). Cheques issued on the Bank of Aotearoa let customers transfer large amounts of money without using cash.

=== Hui at Pīrongia ===
On 11 July 1881, Tāwhiao, escorted by between five hundred and six hundred men, many of them armed, rode into Pirongia from the Tainui settlement at Hikurangi, modern-day Taumarunui. A pacifist, Tāwhiao had finally elected to sue for peace. Chiefs accompanying him included Wahanui and Manuhiri. It was Major William Mair, the Government Native Officer in the Upper Waikato, who was sent by Governor George Grey to meet Tawhiao, and there in the main street of the township the Maori King laid down his gun at Mair's feet. Scores of his men followed his example, until seventy-seven guns were lying on the road in front of the Government officer. According to James Cowan, Wahanui came forward and said: “Do you know what this means, Mair? This is the outcome of Tawhiao's word to you that there would be no more trouble. This means peace.” Mair replied that that was self-evident, and said "I call to mind the words that Tawhiao uttered at Tomotomo-waka (Te Kopua) that there would be no more fighting. This is the day that we all have been waiting for. We know now that there will be no more trouble.”

In spite of this, the next decade would result in further impoverishment for Tainui, as the aukati was dissolved and their last stronghold was exposed to European settlers. The construction of the North Island Main Trunk Railway would spell the end of the Rohe Pōtae as an independent state.

=== Establishment of the Kauhanganui and decline ===
Back in New Zealand in 1886 and seeking Māori solutions to Māori problems through Māori institutions, he petitioned Native Minister John Ballance for the establishment of a Māori Council "for all the chiefs of this Island". When this proposal, too, was ignored, he set up a Kīngitanga parliament at Maungakawa in 1892; initially called the Kauhanganui, it was later renamed Te Whakakitenga. Though all North Island iwi were invited to attend, participation was confined mainly to the Waikato, Maniapoto and Hauraki people who were already part of the King Movement. The assembly's discussions included proceedings in the national Parliament, interpretations of the Treaty of Waitangi, the confiscation issue and conditions for land sales, but its deliberations and recommendations were either ignored or derided by the Parliament and public servants. The establishment of Tāwhiao's Kauhanganui coincided with the formation of a Māori Parliament at Waipatu Marae in Heretaunga. This parliament, which consisted of 96 members from the North and South Islands under Prime Minister Hāmiora Mangakāhia, was formed as part of the Kotahitanga (unification) Movement, which Tāwhiao refused to join.

== Death ==
During the remainder of his life Tāwhiao was respected and treated as royalty by many New Zealanders, both Māori (Kīngitanga-affiliated or not) and Pākehā. But he was allowed almost no influence over political events, as he had no legal authority within English law, which had displaced tikanga.

Tāwhiao died suddenly on 26 August 1894, aged 71 or 72. As is Tainui custom, he was buried at Mount Taupiri in an unmarked grave, as a sign of equality among his people. His tangihanga was held in September and was attended by thousands. He was succeeded as king by his son Mahuta Tāwhiao, who won the election to replace him.

== Religion and philosophy ==
Encouraged by his veteran father's encouragement to become a man of peace, Tāwhiao was a deeply spiritual man throughout his life. The King was both a Christian and a follower of indigenous Māori religion, and although not a tohunga himself he was well versed in the ancient rites of the Tainui priesthood. In later years Tāwhiao's sayings were considered prophecies for the future, and passed down as taonga tuku iho. Tāwhiao's fundamentally pacifist nature led him to formally denounce conflict between Māori and Pākehā, and campaign for peaceful coexistence and Māori autonomy under Section 71 of the New Zealand Constitution Act. Tāwhiao was quoted by his descendant Robert Mahuta as having said: "Beware of being enticed to take up the sword. The result of war is that things become like decaying, old dried flax leaves. Let the person who raises war beware, for he must pay the price."

After his baptism into the faith by the prophet Te Ua Haumene in Ōpunake in 1863, Tāwhiao's connection to the Pai Mārire religion grew stronger. The two men helped established the faith that was initially called Hauhau, or Hauhauism especially by its detractors; the name "Pai Mārire" itself (good and gentle) was taken from a Waikato ritual chant. Tāwhiao also highly valued the relationship between Waikato and Taranaki. During a visit to Taranaki about 1864, Tāwhiao was famously quoted as saying: "You, Taranaki, have one handle of the kit, and I, Waikato, have the other. A child will come some day and gather together its contents".

In 1875, he issued a whakapuakitanga declaring his own version of the faith, which was called Tariao (morning star) – as the official faith of the King movement. Tāwhiao's granddaughter, Te Puea, ensured the continuance of Pai Mārire into modern times, recalling the story of how, just before his death, Tāwhiao told his people, 'I shall return this gift to the base of the mountains, leaving it there to lie. When you are heavily burdened, then fetch it to you.'

=== Connection to Mormonism ===
The Church of Jesus Christ of Latter-day Saints (LDS Church) was active in New Zealand from 1867. In the 1880s, a Wairarapa newspaper quoted Tāwhiao as claiming a belief in Mormonism: "I was some time ago converted to a belief in the Mormon faith, and I now altogether hold to it. My people in the North are believers also in Mormonism, and it is my wish that all the Maori should be of that faith."

Although the LDS Church has no record of Tāwhiao being baptized, other Māori joined the church based on a prophecy they claimed Tāwhiao made in the 1860s—that messengers of God would come from over the Sea of Kiwa (the Pacific Ocean), travelling in pairs and teaching the Māori people in their own language. When some who heard Tāwhiao's prophecy observed pairs of Mormon missionaries from the United States teaching in Māori language, they immediately accepted Mormonism.

It was also claimed by some Māori converts that Tāwhiao accurately predicted the site of the LDS Church's Hamilton New Zealand Temple, which was built in 1958.

There is little direct contemporary evidence of Tāwhiao being a convert to Mormonism. The widely published accounts of his tangihanga make no mention of Mormonism but speak instead of native priests. or tohunga. What is beyond doubt, however, is that he and other Māori leaders of the time did meet with Mormon missionaries.

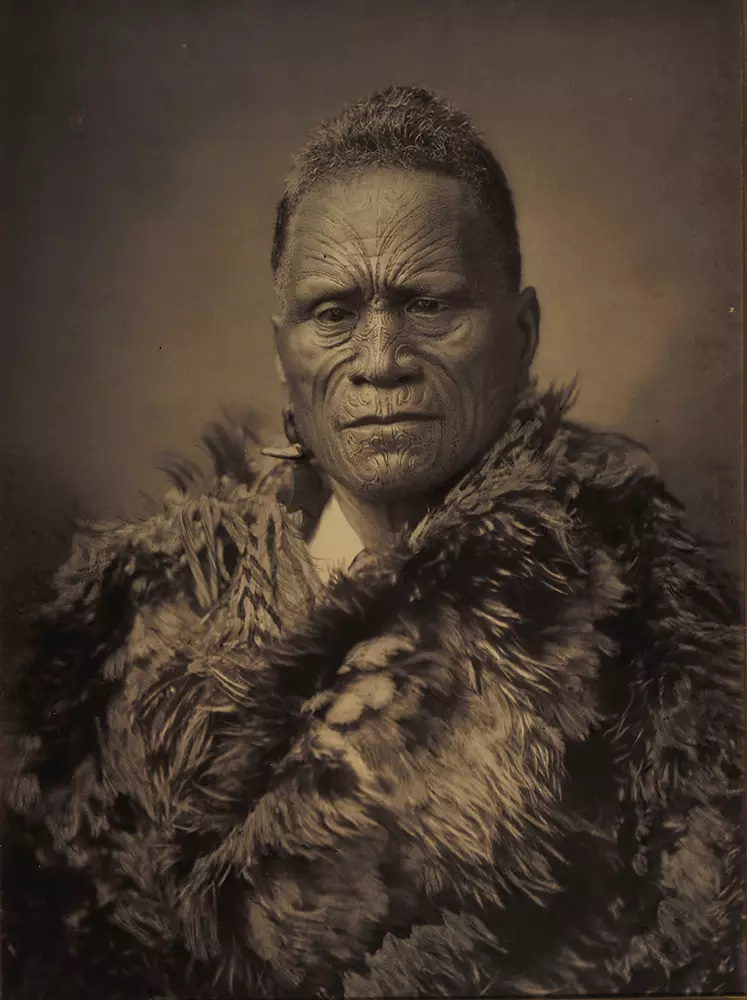
Kīngi Tāwhiao in 1884

== Family ==
Tāwhiao had nine children with his three wives and other women. His main wife was Hera Ngāpora, daughter of his advisor Tāmati Ngāpora and his cousin. Their children were:

- Tiahuia Tāwhiao (1850–1898). Maori Princess, had descendants, including Te Puea Hērangi.
- Mahuta Tāwhiao (1855–1912). 3rd Maori King, had descendants.
- Te Rata Tāwhiao (1857–1900). Maori Prince.
- Tāwhiao Te Wherowhero (1860–1911). Maori Prince Regent.

His second wife was called Rangiaho Taimana, and they had two children:

- Pokaia Tāwhiao (1844–1927). Maori Prince, had descendants.
- Haunui Tāwhiao (1882–1945). Maori Prince, had descendants.

His third wife was Aotea Te Paratene, also a cousin. They had only one daughter:

- Te Aouru Puahaere Te Popoke Tāwhiao (1856–1920). Maori Princess, had descendants.

He had a lover, Hinepau Tamamotu, daughter of a Maori Leader. They had two daughters:

- Irihapeti Peeti Te Paea Tāwhiao (1850–1900). Maori Princess, had descendants.
- Hui Hui Tāwhiao (1851–1910). Maori Princess, had descendants.

== See also ==
- Pai Mārire
- Paora Te Potangaroa

== Bibliography ==
- Belich, James (1986). The New Zealand Wars and the Victorian Interpretation of Racial Conflict (1st ed.). Auckland: Penguin. ISBN 0-14-011162-X.
- Belgrave, Michael (2017). Dancing with the King: The Rise and Fall of the King Country, 1864-1885. Auckland: Auckland University Press. ISBN 9781869408695.
- Dalton, B.J. (1967). War and Politics in New Zealand 1855–1870. Sydney: Sydney University Press.
- King, Michael (2013). Te Puea: A Life. Penguin Random House New Zealand Limited. ISBN 9781742539683.
- King, Michael (2003). The Penguin History of New Zealand. Penguin Books. ISBN 0-14-301867-1.
- O'Malley, Vincent (2016). The Great War for New Zealand: Waikato 1800–2000. Wellington: Bridget Williams Books. ISBN 9781927277577.
- Orange, Claudia (1987). The Treaty of Waitangi. Wellington: Allen & Unwin. ISBN 086861-634-6.
- Walker, Ranginui (1990). Ka Whawhai Tonu Matou: Struggle Without End. Auckland: Penguin. ISBN 0-14-013240-6.

Māori royalty
Preceded by Pōtatau I	Māori King; 1860–1894	Succeeded by Mahuta Tāwhiao
