= Auckland New Zealand Temple =

LDS Church temple in Auckland, New Zealand

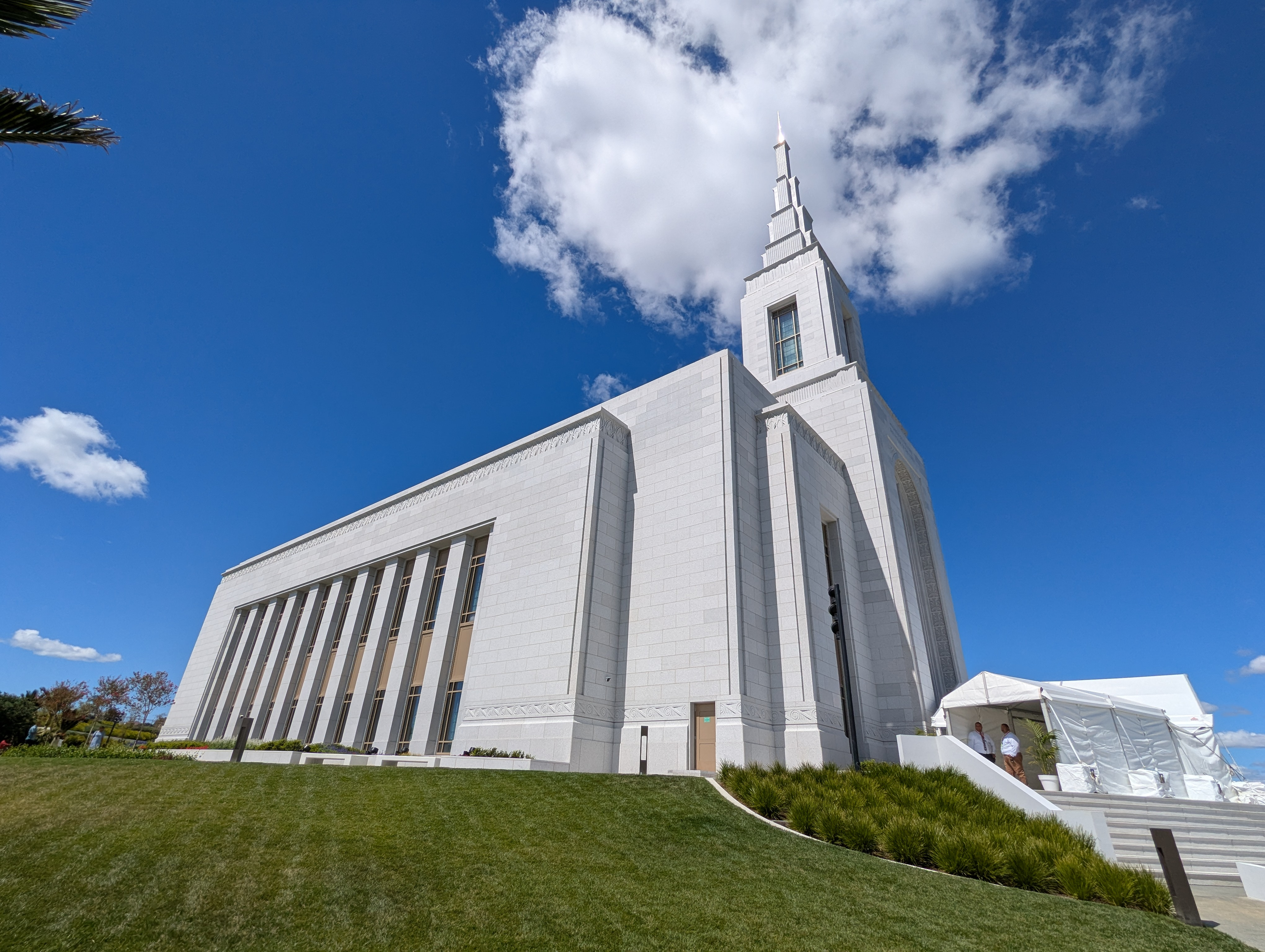
- Interactive map of Auckland New Zealand Temple
- Number: 203
- Dedication: 13 April 2025, by Patrick Kearon
- Site: 11.37 acres (4.60 ha)
- Floor area: 45,456 ft^{2} (4,223.0 m^{2})
- Official website • News & images

Church chronology
← Tallahassee Florida Temple	Auckland New Zealand Temple	→ Nairobi Kenya Temple

Additional information
- Announced: 7 October 2018, by Russell M. Nelson
- Groundbreaking: 13 June 2020, by Ian S. Ardern
- Open house: 27 February–22 March 2025
- Current president: Selesi’utele T. Lavea
- Location: Auckland, New Zealand
- Coordinates: 36.99316°S 174.89015°E
- Baptistries: 1
- Ordinance rooms: 4
- Sealing rooms: 3

The Auckland New Zealand Temple is a temple of the Church of Jesus Christ of Latter-day Saints (LDS Church) in the suburb of Goodwood Heights outside Manukau Central in Auckland, New Zealand. The intent to build the temple was announced on October 7, 2018, by church president Russell M. Nelson, during general conference.

The temple is the second in New Zealand, and was announced the same year that the country’s other temple, in Hamilton, closed for a four-year renovation.

== History ==
The intent to construct the temple was announced by church president Russell M. Nelson on October 7, 2018, concurrently with 11 other temples. At the time of the announcement, the number of the church's total number of operating or announced temples was 201.

On June 13, 2020, a groundbreaking to signify beginning of construction was held, with Ian S. Ardern, president of the church's Pacific Area, presiding.

On October 28, 2024, the church announced that a public open house would be held from February 27 to March 22, 2025. The temple was dedicated on April 13, 2025, by Patrick Kearon of the Quorum of the Twelve Apostles.

== Design and architecture ==
The building has a traditional Latter-day Saint temple design, reflecting both the cultural heritage of the Auckland region and its spiritual significance to the church. The temple's landscaping has green and red bushes and trees.

The exterior has “rows of rectangular windows, with a tall arch above the entrance. The spire atop the temple is located on a square base and has a rectangular window on each side.” The design incorporates elements that are reflective of both the local culture and the broader Church symbolism.

The temple includes four instruction rooms, three sealing rooms, and a baptistry, each arranged for ceremonial use. Symbolic elements are integrated into the design, providing deeper meaning to the temple's function and aesthetics.

== Temple presidents ==
The church's temples are directed by a temple president and matron, each serving for a term of three years. The president and matron oversee the administration of temple operations and provide guidance and training for both temple patrons and staff. The first president and matron of the temple are Selesi’utele T. Lavea and Camellia Ligaliga Lavea.

== Admittance ==
On October 28, 2024, the church announced the public open house that was held from February 27 to March 22, 2025 (excluding Sundays). The temple was dedicated on April 13, 2025, by Patrick Kearon.

Like all the church's temples, it is not used for Sunday worship services. To members of the church, temples are regarded as sacred houses of the Lord. Once dedicated, only church members with a current temple recommend can enter for worship.

== See also ==
- Comparison of temples of The Church of Jesus Christ of Latter-day Saints
- List of temples of The Church of Jesus Christ of Latter-day Saints
- List of temples of The Church of Jesus Christ of Latter-day Saints by geographic region
- Temple architecture (Latter-day Saints)
Temples in New Zealand
- = Operating
- = Under construction
- = Announced
- = Temporarily Closed
