= The Church of Jesus Christ of Latter-day Saints in the Cook Islands =

Latter Day Saints Church

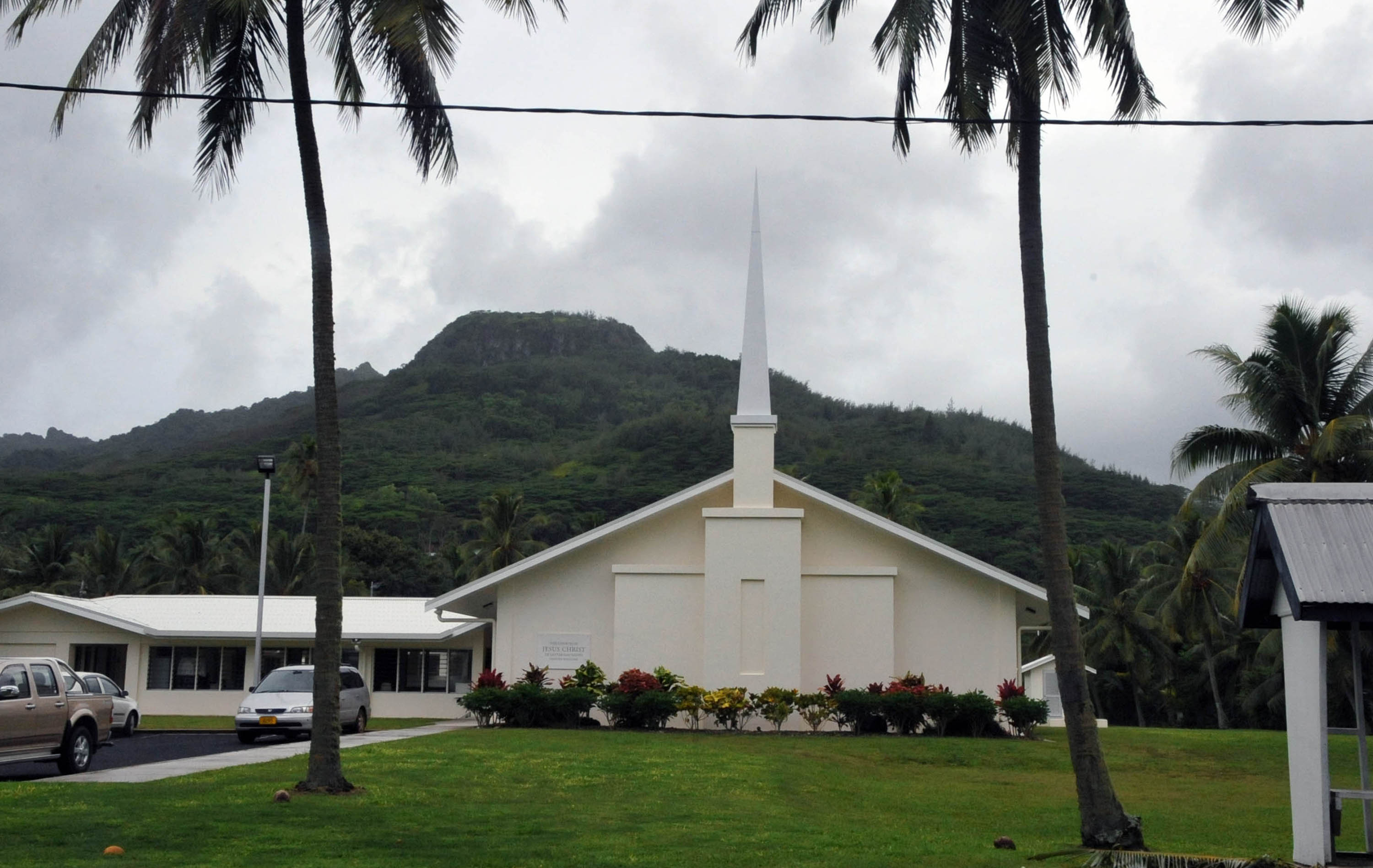
- A meetinghouse for the Church of Jesus Christ of Latter-day Saints in Arorangi, Rarotonga
- Area: Pacific
- Members: 1,912 (2024)
- Districts: 1
- Branches: 5
- FamilySearch Centers: 3

The Church of Jesus Christ of Latter-day Saints in the Cook Islands refers to the Church of Jesus Christ of Latter-day Saints (LDS Church) and its members in Cook Islands. The first regularly held Sunday meetings began in 1943. In 2024, there were 1,912 members in 5 congregations.

== History ==
Membership in the Cook Islands
Year	Membership
1949	160
1960	200
1970	913
1979	718
1989*	700
1999	880
2009	1,834
2019	1,865
2024	1,912
*Membership was published as a rounded number. Source: Wendall J. Ashton; Jim M. Wall, Deseret News, various years, Church Almanac Country Information: Cook Islands

The islands presently known as the Cook Islands were briefly visited by missionaries on a few occasions in the mid to late 1800's. Missionaries arrived in 1899 but left by 1903 due to lack of interest in the church. In 1942, Fritz and Maudina Kruger, a newly married couple, were assigned to establish the church in Rarotonga. They established a bakery business in Avarua. On May 12, 1942, the Cook Islands first converts, Samuel Glassie and his family, were baptized. In 1943, church meetings were held in the northern Puaikura District. Later that year Sunday meetings was relocated to Muri. By June 1946, there were 37 members. Around this time, Kruger and his family returned to New Zealand, briefly leaving no priesthood leadership. Trevor and Mildred Hamon arrived on September 12, 1946 with instructions to build a chapel. On October 6, 1946 a branch was organized. Early meetinghouses were mostly native hut-like structures. More permanent structures were built starting in 1955. On January 17, 1955, church president David O. McKay visited with members in Rarotonga. The Book of Mormon was translated into Cook Islands Maori in 1966. On April 17, 1966, Cook Islands Rarotonga District was created.

In 1970 and subsequent years, many members of the church in the Cook Islands moved to New Zealand. On February 14, 1981, Spencer W. Kimball visited Rarotonga.

In 1990, a Cook Islands postal stamp featured Osborne J. P. Widtsoe, the first missionary that arrived on the islands in front of one of its chapels. On May 22, 2016, Elder Neil L. Andersen visited the Cook Islands. In 2017, the Cook Islands Ministry of Justice and FamilySearch International announced birth, death and marriage records were available online. Indexing these records for ancestry searches commenced that year.

== District and Congregations ==
As of May 2025, Cook Islands had the following district and congregations:

Avarua Cook Islands District

- Aitutaki Branch (Aitutaki Island)
- Arorangi Branch (Rarotonga Island)
- Avarua Branch (Rarotonga Island) (District Center)
- Mangaia Branch (Mangaia Island)
- Takitumu Branch (Rarotonga Island)

Congregations not part of a stake are called branches, regardless of size. Family History Centers are located adjacent to the Aitutaki, Avarua, and Mangaia Branch meetinghouses.

== Niue ==
As of December 31, 2024, nearby Niue had 323 members in a single congregation: The Niue Branch which meets in Alofi. A Family History Center is located in the meetinghouse.

== Missions ==
The Islands were part of the New Zealand Mission until July 17, 1954 when it became part of the Samoan Mission. The Rarotonga Mission was organized on November 20, 1960 which lasted until 1966 to more easily supervise missionary work on the islands. On April 15, 1966 the islands was once again under direction of the New Zealand Mission. On July 23, 1971, the islands became part of the Fiji Mission, then the Tahiti Papeete Mission in 1975. On January 1, 1981, the islands became part of the New Zealand Auckland Mission.

== Temples ==
There are no temples in the Cook Islands. The Cook Islands is currently located in the Papeete Tahiti Temple District.

== See also ==
- Religion in the Cook Islands
- The Church of Jesus Christ of Latter-day Saints in New Zealand
