= Ēpiha Pūtini =

19th-century Ngāti Tamaoho chief in Auckland, New Zealand

- Chief of Ngāti Tamaoho
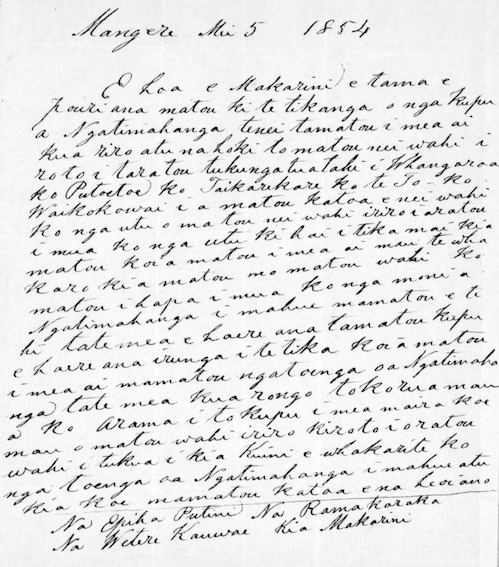
- Letter from Epiha Putini, Arama Karaka and Wetere Kauwae to Donald McLean, written in Māngere, 5 May 1854
- Born: c. 1816
- Died: 22 March 1856
- Burial: Ihumātao
- Spouse: Te Paea Tīaho

Ēpiha Pūtini (c. 1816 – 22 March 1856), born Te Rangiata-Ahua Ngamuka and later known as Jabez Bunting was a prominent chief of Ngāti Tamaoho, who occupied the area south of Papatoetoe and through the Hunua Ranges to the Bombay Hills. As rangatira, Pūtini was involved in multiple land disputes and controversial land sales in the isthmus and south Manukau area during the 1830s and early 1840s, which led to an exchange of gunfire between individuals from Ngāti Tamaoho and neighbouring iwi Ngāti Te Ata, and resulted in several deaths on the side of Ngāti Te Ata. Pūtini is best remembered for his Wesleyan faith, which resulted in the establishment of the Ihumātao Mission Station, as well as his continued efforts to foster peace between Māori and European settlers.

Pūtini died unexpectedly on 22 March 1856. Following Pūtini's death, Pōtatau Te Wherowhero, the future Māori King, arranged for his body to be taken to Māngere, before being buried at Ihumātao. Putini's tangi (funeral) was attended by roughly 800 people, and he was mourned by both Māori and Pākehā. Pūtini's significance continued after his death, as during the exhumation of his bones at Ihumātao a great meeting was held, hosting between two and three thousand people, and is remembered as one of the key hui (meetings) that discussed the election of a Māori King, and ultimately, the creation of the Kingitanga.

== Biography ==
Pūtini was born in 1816, to Te Tuhi, a prominent Waikato chief of the Maungaunga hapū, and Te Po, a 'Chieftainess of celebrity'. After the death of his parents, Pūtini was taken in by his relative Wiremu Wetere Te Kauae, a Ngāti Tamaoho chief.

=== Religion ===
In the mid-1830's, Pūtini spent two years at the Wesleyan Methodist Mission Station at Māngungu in the Hokianga, and was baptised on 15 October 1835, adopting the baptismal name Jabez Bunting (translated in Māori as Ēpiha Pūtini), after the English Wesleyan Methodist leader of the same name.

=== Ihumātao Mission Station ===
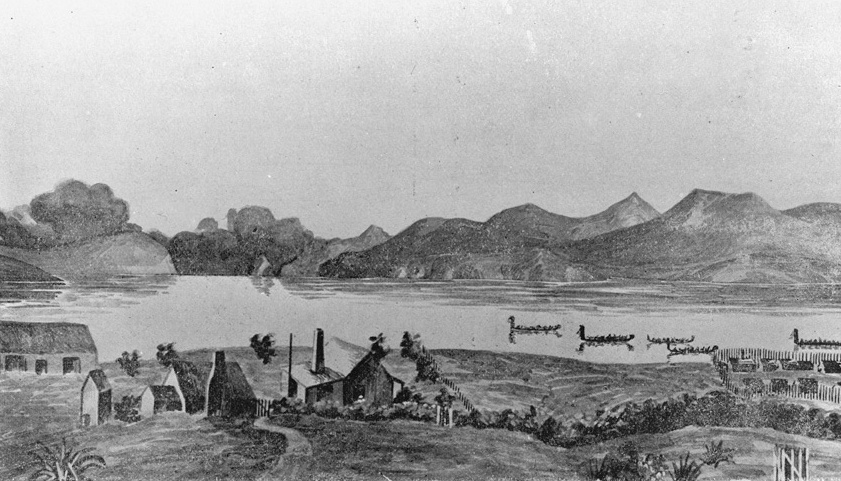
Ihumātao Mission Station opposite Manukau Heads (1855)

In 1836 Pūtini moved back with his tribe to the Āwhitu Peninsula. on the west shore of the Manukau Harbour. Following his move back, Pūtini requested to have a Wesleyan missionary to be sent to his village at Pehiakura, and be based there. This was spurred on by the closure of the Wesleyan mission at Ōrua that same year, after a dispute with the Anglican Church Missionary Society. Pūtini's request was denied, due to the agreement made by the two denominations to stay out of each other's jurisdiction. Despite this denial, Pūtini refused to move his allegiance away from the Wesleyans. A notable interaction is recorded, where visiting a visiting minister offered to baptise Pūtini into the Anglican denomination. Pūtini responded enquiring how many times Jesus Christ was baptised, and when the minister replied 'once', Pūtini responded, "Then once will do for me, as I wish to imitate His example as closely as possible".

After the denial of a missionary, Pūtini built a Methodist chapel in Pehiakura out of raupō, and in 1838, began teaching the gospel and also running a school. Numerous baptisms and marriages are recorded taking place at this raupō chapel. Pūtini continued to campaign not only for a Wesleyan missionary at Pehiakura, but also housing, schools, and hospitals. Following the Remuera Feast of 1844, an inter-tribal peacemaking event of which Pūtini was one of the hosts, Pūtini approached Reverend Walter Lawry, the recently appointed Superintendent of the Methodist Mission, to once again, request for a missionary. Lawry was impressed by Pūtini, and described him favourably, saying:

‘A fine chief, about thirty-five years of age, who for many years has been baptised into the Christian faith and has walked uprightly… He is a fine person, has agreeable features, is not tattooed, and generally appears in European clothes. His wife rides on her saddle and horse and he on his: probably they are the only example of this advance in civilization in New Zealand… He is currently the most intelligent man I have seen amongst the aborigines’.

Following this meeting, Lawry agreed to send a missionary to Pehiakura, and although there is no date of the erection of the Ihumātao mission station, the buildings were erected by 1849.

=== Land sales ===
Ēpiha Pūtini was involved in numerous land sales, including many pre-treaty sales. These include:

- Ramarama Block, Waikato, sold to Queen Victoria, on 10 June 1846. This was a 15,000 hectare block, consisting of a narrow strip of land that stretched from the Pahurehure Inlet to the Waikato River near what is now Mercer. This block was sold for £200, three heads, of cattle, four horses, three saddles and bridles, one hundred and fifty double blankets, a dray, a plough, a pair of harrows, and one set of cart harnesses. Fellow chiefs Wiremu Wetere, Matiu Te Oranga, Tamati Hapimana, and Aperahama were also involved in the sale
- Land at the foot of Mount Hobson, sold to Edward Meurant, a government interpreter, on 9 April 1844. Pūtini acquired this land as a gift from Te Taoū, as an expression of gratitude for his assistance during the fighting of the Musket Wars.

== Later years ==
=== Deteriorating relationship with the Crown ===
Pūtini actively participated in European modes of governance, and utilised European methods in an attempt to maintain peace within his area under British rule. Despite these attempts, colonial authority began to supersede traditional Māori authority, facilitated mostly by large-scale land purchases. Pūtini, a chief that was highly active within Auckland society, and had many close relationships with settlers and government officials, had lost faith in the ability of the colonial government to deliver the unity and peace that he so desired. During an 1853 interview with missionary Robert Young, Pūtini was asked whether he was satisfied with land arrangements made by the British government, he replied:

‘I think one place is straight, and another place is crooked… We like the law, which says, the Queen shall buy our lands first. This is quite straight… The crooked place is here. The Governor sometimes buys lands from Chiefs that have no right to sell them…. I gave the Governor a pukapuka (book) with all my lands written in it and told him, when anybody came from my district to sell land, to look into the pukapuka. But some of those lands have been sold.’

=== Death and tangi ===
Pūtini died unexpectedly on 22 March 1856, at around forty years of age, after being seized by violent abdominal pain the day earlier. His funeral was organised by Te Wherowhero, his father in law, and Pūtini was to be taken to Māngere, before burial at Ihumātao. His death was mourned by both Māori and Pākehā alike, although Pūtini was described by missionaries to have died while in a 'backsliding state', a reference to his growing disillusionment with the colonial government.

Pūtini's tangi and exhumation of bones took place on 22 May 1857, and doubled as a large hui, one of multiple that discussed the establishment of a Māori king. Around two to three thousand people attended, and later, Bishop Selwyn, who was in attendance, reported "It was probably the largest human gathering seen in that district since the white man came to New Zealand”.

=== 'The Lament of Putini' ===
Following Putini's death, his widow Te Paea composed a tangi, or lament, about him. A translation of the tangi was published in the Colonist newspaper on 20 October 1863. The original Te Reo Māori and English translation read as follows:

Te Reo Māori:

Tera Kopu, hapai o te ata! e!

Me he mea ko te hoa tenei ka hoki mai.

E mihi ana au taku kahui Tara

I tukua iho ai, ka hinga ki raro e

Tu ke mai Taupiri i te tonga

Karekare kau ana te tai ki Manuka.

I haere rangitahi ko te rangi ki te mate.

Kihai I ponaia te hua I Motutara

Hoki mai e pa! to moenga I te whare.

E pupuri nei au te tau o taku ata.

Tena ka tiu, ka wehe i a au, i.

English translation:

Star of the morning! thou whose beam proclaims the lamp of day at hand,

Like my beloved dost thou seem returning from the Spirit land.

I gaze ,—then turn aside to mourn o'er these sweet nestlings at my side,

Left in their helplessness forlorn, For thou—their sire,—their shield—hast died.

Far to the southward dark and sweep, Taupiri lifts its lonely brow ;

Unheard, unheeded, onward sweep the surges wild of manukau.

But thou art gone—and in an hour !

There Motutara's gem may lie :— 'mong chiefs of fame and priests of power.

Of thee 'twill rouse no memory !

Return ! return ! and in thine home, Father and Lord ! once more recline ;

Back to my widowed bosom come— My heart but beats as linked with thine !

There was a bird whose tuneful throat

Welcomed the day with joyous tone ; Stilled is the song and hushed the note

My bird is fled, and I—alone !
