= Glen L. Rudd =

American missionary (1918–2016)

First Quorum of the Seventy
- April 4, 1987 – April 1, 1989
- Called by: Ezra Taft Benson
- End reason: Transferred to Second Quorum of the Seventy

Second Quorum of the Seventy
- April 1, 1989 – October 3, 1992
- Called by: Ezra Taft Benson
- End reason: Honorably released

Personal details
- Born: Glen Larkin Rudd; May 18, 1918; Salt Lake City, Utah, U.S.
- Died: December 30, 2016 (aged 98); Salt Lake City, Utah, U.S.

Glen Larkin Rudd (May 18, 1918 – December 30, 2016) was a general authority of the Church of Jesus Christ of Latter-day Saints (LDS Church) from 1987 to 1992.

Rudd was born and raised in Salt Lake City, Utah. As a young man, he served as a missionary for the LDS Church in New Zealand, where his mission president was Matthew Cowley. For part of his mission he served as secretary to, and traveling companion of, Cowley.

After he returned from his mission he married Marva Sperry. The marriage was performed by LDS Church apostle Harold B. Lee, who had been Rudd's stake president when he was a child.

Rudd ran his own poultry business. He was made a bishop in the LDS Church by the time he was 25. After running his own business for about 12 years he was recruited by Lee to be a full-time employee of the Welfare Program of the LDS Church, eventually becoming the manager of Welfare Square and over other operations.

From 1966 to 1969 Rudd was the president of the church's Florida Mission, which was headquartered in Orlando. In this capacity he was also the church leader of the members that then lived in the islands of the Caribbean. Rudd later served for four months as mission president in the New Zealand Wellington Mission, following the death of the previous mission president.

In 1987, Rudd became a member of the church's First Quorum of the Seventy; at the time, he was specifically called for a limited time of service. In 1989, along with the other general authorities serving for limited periods of service, Rudd was transferred to the newly formed Second Quorum of the Seventy. He was released from this position and as a general authority in 1992.

Rudd was president of the Hamilton New Zealand Temple from 1984 to 1987.

Rudd is the author of the book "Pure Religion," which details the history of the welfare programs of the LDS Church. The book was the result of his efforts to write some material regarding the history of the church's welfare program, at the request of the First Presidency. The book was published in September 1995.

Rudd died on December 30, 2016, at the age of 98. LDS Church president Thomas S. Monson spoke at Rudd's funeral. Monson and Rudd had served as bishops in the same stake when they were younger.
