= Michael Belgrave =

New Zealand historian

- Belgrave in 2016
- Born: Michael Peter Belgrave

Academic background
- Education: Victoria University of Wellington
- Thesis: "Medical Men" and "Lady Doctors": the Making of a New Zealand Profession, 1867–1941 (1985)

Academic work
- Discipline: New Zealand history
- Institutions: Massey University

Michael Peter Belgrave is a New Zealand historian. He is an emeritus professor of history at Massey University. He helped found Massey University's Albany campus in 1993. Belgrave also served as research manager of the Waitangi Tribunal and continues to work on Treaty of Waitangi research and settlements. In 2015, Belgrave received a Marsden Fund award for his research into the causes of the New Zealand Wars of the 1860s. In 2018, he received the Ernest Scott Prize for his book Dancing with the King, which examined the history of the King Country between 1864 and 1885.

== Professional career ==
Prior to entering academia, Michael Belgrave worked as a historian and research manager for the Waitangi Tribunal, producing research on several of the Tribunal's district inquiries and settlements. In 1993, he joined Massey University's new Albany campus as an academic in its social policy and social work programme until 2014. He also taught Māori studies and history. In 1995, Belgrave founded a programme for social workers and schools targeting low-income decile 1–3 schools.

After leaving Massey University's social policy and social work, Belgrave continued his research on Treaty of Waitangi settlements. He also assisted several iwi (tribes) in negotiating the historical aspects of several Treaty settlements. In 2015, he received a Marsden Fund award for his research into the causes of the New Zealand Wars of the 1860s.

In 2017, Belgrave's Dancing with the King: The Rise and Fall of the King Country, 1864–1885 was published by Auckland University Press. The book looked at the second Māori King Tāwhiao's establishment of an independent state in the King Country following the Waikato War. The Reader's reviewer Lincoln Gould praised it for exploring the impact of British colonisation on Māori land ownership in New Zealand. Radio New Zealand reviewer Harry Broad compared it to anthropologist Anne Salmond's Tears of Rangi. Paul Meredith praised Belgrave's book for its contribution to the history of the King Country, Tawhiao and Ngāti Maniapoto. In April 2018, Belgrave won the Ernest Scott Prize for Dancing with the King.

In November 2024, Belgrave's Becoming Aotearoa: A New History of New Zealand was published by Massey University Press. In the book, he argued "that New Zealand's two peoples–tangata whenua and subsequent migrants–worked together to build an open, liberal society based on sometimes frayed social contracts." Belgrave also argued that contemporary New Zealand debates about the New Zealand Crown's relationship with Māori leaders and citizens originated in efforts by Christian missionaries during the 1830s to promote a sovereign Māori nation-state with its own national law system and parliament. Belgrave disagreed with the historian Ruth Ross's view that the Treaty of Waitangi was mistranslated, instead arguing that Māori participants were well informed of the Treaty's contents and had made up their mind before missionary Henry Williams produced the Māori language version of the document. Belgrave argued that Māori advocates viewed the Treaty of Waitangi as a sacred compact between rangatira (tribal nobles) and the Crown. New Zealand Geographic's reviewer Rachel Morris praised Becoming Aotearoa for exploring the relationship between Māori and Christian missionaries and Māori perspectives of the Treaty of Waitangi. Chris Trotter gave a more critical review of the book in the New Zealand Listener, describing it as revisionist history and comparing it to the 1619 Project.

== Views and positions ==
In September 2019, Belgrave welcomed moves by the Sixth Labour Government to incorporate New Zealand history into the national school curriculum from 2012. He argued that making the teaching of New Zealand history compulsory would force young people to "confront the challenging questions of inequality, racism and legacies of the Empire."

In May 2023, Belgrave disputed Australian senator Jacinta Nampijinpa Price's assertion during the lead-up to the 2023 Australian Indigenous Voice referendum that the Waitangi Tribunal had veto powers over the New Zealand Parliament. In response, he explained that the Tribunal's purview had expanded from land claims to cover various aspects of public policy. Belgrave also regarded the Tribunal as a template for the Indigenous Voice to Parliament to "create new Indigenous rights."

== Selected publications ==
- Belgrave, Michael (2005). Historical Frictions: Maori Claims and Reinvented Histories. Auckland: Auckland University Press. ISBN 9781869403201.
- Cheyne, Christine; O'Brien, Mike; Belgrave, Michael (2008). Social Policy in Aotearoa New Zealand. South Melbourne: Oxford University Press. ISBN 9780195585018.
- Belgrave, Michael (2016). From Empire's Servant to Global Citizen: A history of Massey University. Auckland: Massey University Press. ISBN 9780994132505.
- Bell, Rachel; Kawharu, Margaret; Taylor, Kerry; Belgrave, Michael; Meihana, Peter, eds. (2017). The Treaty on the Ground: Where we are headed, and why it matters. Auckland: Massey University Press. ISBN 9780994130051.
- Belgrave, Michael (2017). Dancing with the King: The Rise and Fall of the King Country, 1864-1885. Auckland: Auckland University Press. ISBN 9781869408695.
- Belgrave, Michael (2024). Becoming Aotearoa: A New History of New Zealand. Auckland: Massey University Press. ISBN 9780995131866.
