= Douglas J. Martin =

First Quorum of the Seventy
- 4 April 1987 – 1 April 1989
- Called by: Ezra Taft Benson
- End reason: Transferred to Second Quorum of the Seventy

Second Quorum of the Seventy
- 1 April 1989 – 3 October 1992
- Called by: Ezra Taft Benson
- End reason: Honorably released

Personal details
- Born: Douglas James Martin; 20 April 1927; Napier, New Zealand
- Died: 23 January 2010 (aged 82); Hamilton, New Zealand
- Spouse(s): Amelia Wati Crawford
- Children: 4

Douglas James Martin (20 April 1927 – 23 January 2010) was a general authority of the Church of Jesus Christ of Latter-day Saints (LDS Church) from 1987 to 1992. He was the first New Zealand resident to become a church general authority.

Martin was born in Napier, New Zealand. He was introduced to the LDS Church by Amelia Wati Crawford (who was Maori), and he was baptised in 1951 at age 24. He was a missionary for the LDS Church from 1952 to 1954 serving in New Zealand. Crawford was a missionary in New Zealand at the same time. In 1954, he and Crawford travelled to Hawaii and were married in the church's Laie Hawaii Temple.

He worked for a company that made moulds of plastic, rising to the level of manager.

Shortly after the New Zealand Temple was completed in 1958, church president David O. McKay made Martin a sealer in the temple. From 1958 to 1962, he was the temple recorder.

Martin also served in the LDS Church as a bishop, stake president of the Hamilton New Zealand Stake, and stake patriarch in Hamilton. Martin was serving as a regional representative when he was called as a general authority and member of the First Quorum of the Seventy in 1987. In April 1989 became one of the inaugural members of the Second Quorum of the Seventy. He was released as a general authority in October 1992. From 1992 to 1995, he was president of the Hamilton New Zealand Temple.

In 2010, Martin died in Hamilton at age 82.
