= Pāora Te Potangaroa =

Maori prophet (died 1881)

Pāora Te Potangaroa (died 1881) was a Māori prophet and rangatira of the Rangitāne iwi in the Wairarapa region of the North Island of New Zealand. Little is known about his life, but he is known for having uttered an 1881 prophecy of the coming of a church that would be for the Māori people.

== Prophecy ==
In 1878 he led the building of a large carved wharenui (meeting house) at Te Ore Ore Marae near Masterton. During construction he fell out with Te Kere Ngatai-e-rua, who was another prophet and a carver. Te Kere left the project, predicting it would take eight years to finish. It was completed by 1881, and Pāora named the house Ngā Tau e Waru (The Eight Years) to highlight Te Kere's failed prophecy. In March 1881, several thousand members of the Ngāti Hamua gathered for a hui in Ngā Tau e Waru. During the meeting, Pāora Te Potangaroa spoke of the spiritual impotency of the Christian missionaries that had visited the Māori. When some of the attendees pressed Potangaroa on which was the church for the Māori, he retired to his nearby residence for three days of fasting, meditation, and prayer.

Potangaroa reconvened the meeting on March 16 and announced that he had received knowledge of a coming church for the Māori: "There is a religious denomination coming for us; perhaps it will come from there, perhaps it will emerge here. ... [T]here will be a time when a religion will emerge for you and I and the Māori people." Another reported account elaborated:

You will recognize it when it comes. Its missionaries will travel in pairs. They will come from the rising sun. They will visit with us in our homes. They will learn our language and teach us the gospel in our own tongue. When they pray they will raise their right hands.

Potangaroa also set down in writing "He Kawenata" – "the covenant" – which included other signs that would let his followers know that his prophecy had been fulfilled within forty years. The covenant predicted that 1881 would be the "day of the fulness", 1882 would be a "year of the sealing", 1883 would be a "year of great faith", and that through these events the Māori "will learn of the Scepter of Judah ... of the Kingdom of Heaven [and] of the sacred church with a large wall surrounding." The covenant was sealed in a monument at the Te Ore Ore Marae.

== Claimed fulfillments of the prophecy ==
=== Mormonism ===
Shortly after uttering his prophecy, Potangaroa died. Later that same year, missionaries from the Church of Jesus Christ of Latter-day Saints (LDS Church) made initial contacts with individuals from Ngāti Kahungunu. Some of the Maori who converted to Mormonism believed that the coming of the Mormon missionaries was a fulfillment of Potangaroa's prophecy. Potangaroa's "day of the fulness" was identified as the missionaries bearing the "fulness of the Gospel"; the "year of the sealing" was identified as the time the Māori learned of the Latter-day Saint sealing ordinances; and the "sacred church with a large wall surrounding" was identified as the Salt Lake Temple, which is located on Temple Square, surrounded by a high wall. It was also pointed out by believers that the Mormon missionaries had come in pairs from "the rising sun" (the United States, to the east), that the missionaries taught the Ngāti Kahungunu in the Māori language in their own homes, and that they raised their arms when they prayed.

By 1883 – Potangaroa's "year of great faith" – hundreds of Ngāti Kahungunu had joined the LDS Church in the Wairarapa. An apostle of the LDS Church would later claim that by 1921, the fortieth anniversary of Potangaroa's prophecy, only Māori from Ngāti Kahungunu had joined the LDS Church and received temple ordinances, and that Māori from other tribes began receiving these sealing ordinances only after the forty-year "covenant" of Potangaroa had been fulfilled.

=== Others ===
Other religious groups that have been seen as fulfillments of the prophecy include the Rātana church, founded by Tahupotiki Wiremu Ratana; the Ringatū church, founded by Te Kooti; and the Church of the Seven Rules of Jehovah, founded by Simon Patete.

== See also ==
- Tāwhiao
