= Bank of Aotearoa =

Historic Māori bank established at Parawera in 1886 by the King Tāwhiao

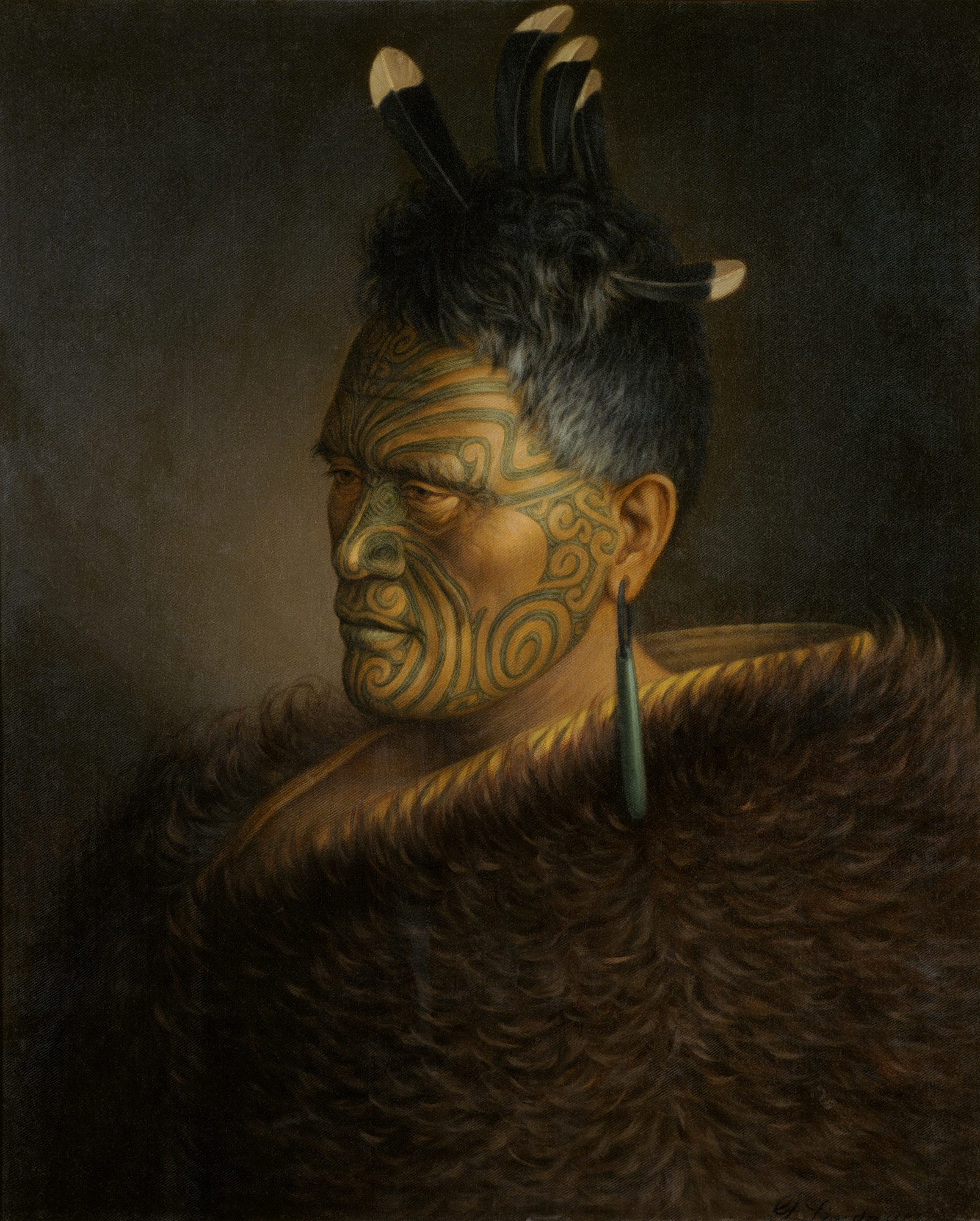
King Tawhiao as depicted by the artist Gottfried Lindauer in 1885

Te Peeke o Aotearoa (often translated as the Bank of Aotearoa or Bank of the North Island) was a Māori‑initiated financial institution established in 1886 at Parawera by the second Māori King, Tāwhiao. It formed part of the wider programme of political and economic autonomy pursued by the Kīngitanga in the late nineteenth century. The bank operated at Parawera, Maungatautari and Maungakawa, and appears to have remained active until at least 1905.

== Historical context ==
Tāwhiao, who became king in 1860, lived in exile for two decades following the invasion of the Waikato and subsequent land confiscations. After peace was concluded in 1881, he began developing independent Māori institutions, including a parliament (the Kauhanganui), a treasury, courts, constables, licensing systems and a bank intended to serve Māori communities. Te Peeke o Aotearoa emerged as both a practical treasury mechanism and an assertion of Māori self‑determination.

== Establishment ==
The bank was established at Parawera in 1886, with supporting activity recorded at Maungatautari by late 1885. Its aims were to:

- provide safe deposit and lending facilities for Māori
- conduct financial transactions within Kingitanga territory
- support political, social and tribal initiatives
- symbolise Māori capacity to operate national‑style institutions independent of colonial structures

== Banknotes ==
=== Design ===
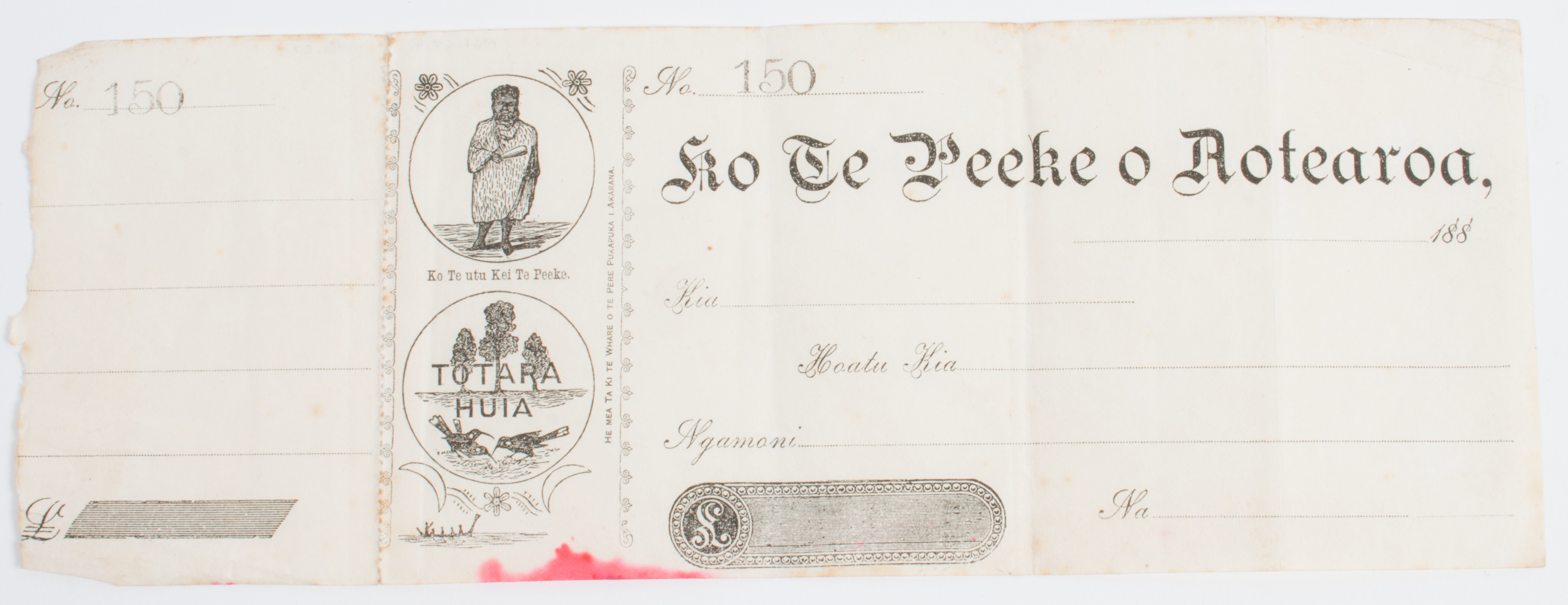
Unused bank cheque form including stub or butt

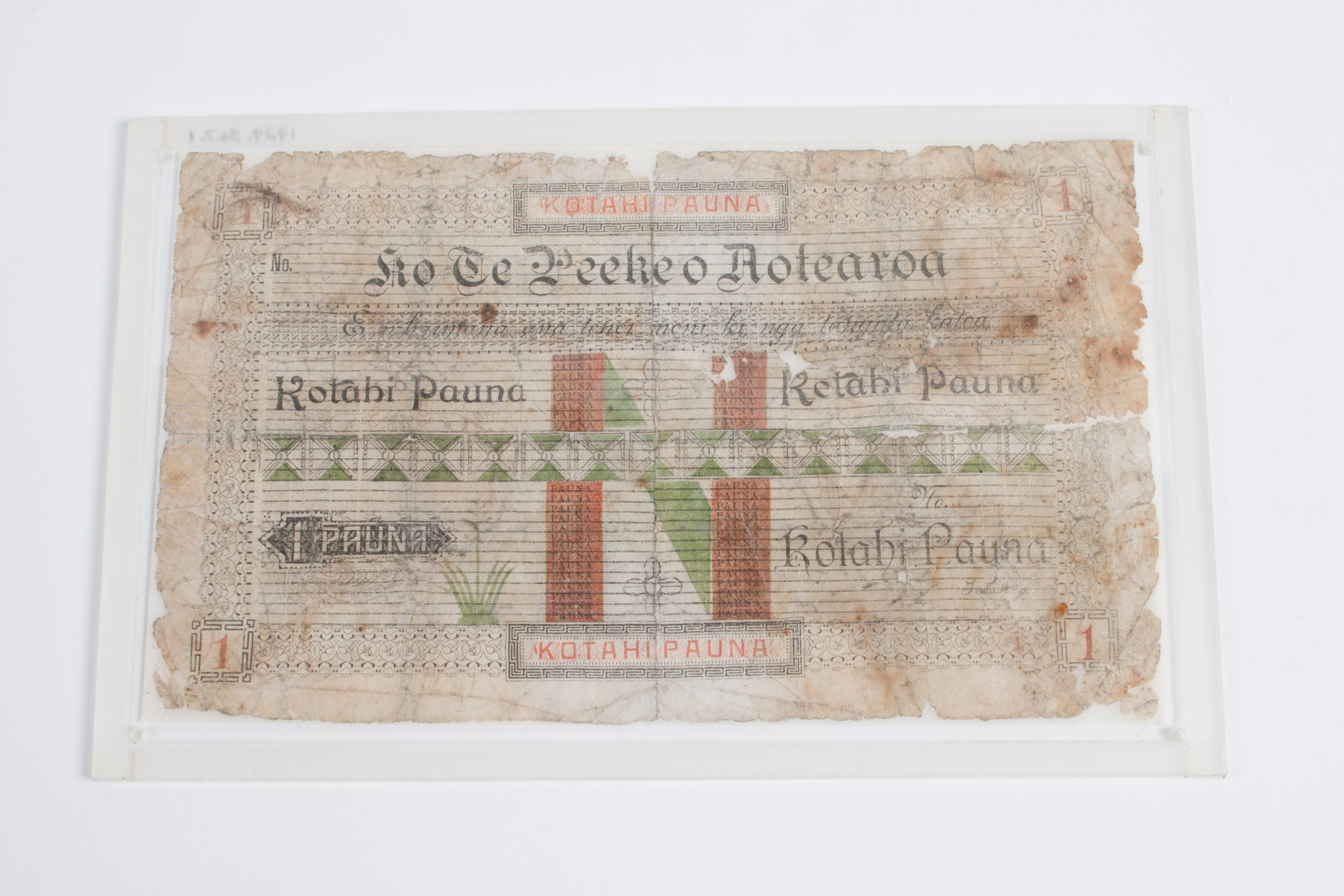
Banknote (not issued)

Te Peeke o Aotearoa produced elaborately printed kotahi pauna (one‑pound) banknotes. Surviving examples show:

- five‑colour printing
- Gothic and decorative typography
- text in te reo Māori, including Ko Te Peeke o Aotearoa, Kotahi Pauna and E whaimana ana tenei moni ki nga tangata katoa
- a flax bush motif
- colour variants, watermark differences and the presence or absence of the signature Tawhia.

Notes appear to have been printed in Auckland, likely by the Bell Press. All known examples are unnumbered or specimen‑numbered, indicating proof‑stage production.

=== Issuance ===
Although sample banknotes were printed, there is no evidence that they were ever formally issued. Surviving notes show limited circulation wear.

== Cheques and banking operations ==
Unlike banknotes, cheques were definitely issued and used. Printed forms for Te Peeke o Aotearoa and Maungatautari Peeke featured Māori‑language headings, perforated stubs and printed vignettes. Known signatories include T. T. Rāwhiti, Tupu Taingakawa and Tukere.

One cheque dated 1905 confirms that Maungatautari Peeke remained active well after the decline of the Maungakawa settlement.

== Relationship with Maungatautari and Maungakawa banks ==
Historical sources refer to Te Peeke o Aotearoa, Maungatautari Peeke and the so‑called Bank of Maungakawa. These appear to have been branches or variants of the same institution. Some early Pākehā reporting, such as the 1891 Hawke’s Bay Herald article, was inaccurate or patronising, but remains useful as a primary source when treated with caution.

== Administration ==
Key figures included:

- King Tāwhiao – founder
- Mahuta Tawhiao Potatau Te Wherowhero – successor
- Tupu Taingakawa Te Waharoa – Tumuaki of the Kauhanganui
- T. T. Rāwhiti – Secretary of the Kingitanga and de facto manager

== Operations and decline ==
The bank provided loans, collected fines, managed levies and enabled cashless transfers via cheques. Its decline related to political changes, shifting Kingitanga centres and the 1895 influenza outbreak at Maungakawa.

By 1918 the Kingitanga was banking with the Bank of Australasia, and Te Peeke o Aotearoa had ceased to operate.

== Legacy ==
Te Peeke o Aotearoa is recognised as an early expression of Māori economic autonomy. Its cheque system demonstrates genuine independent financial activity within Kingitanga territory.

== See also ==
- Te Kotahitanga – 1890s movement for an independent New Zealand Māori parliament
