= Church College of New Zealand =

School in Hamilton, New Zealand

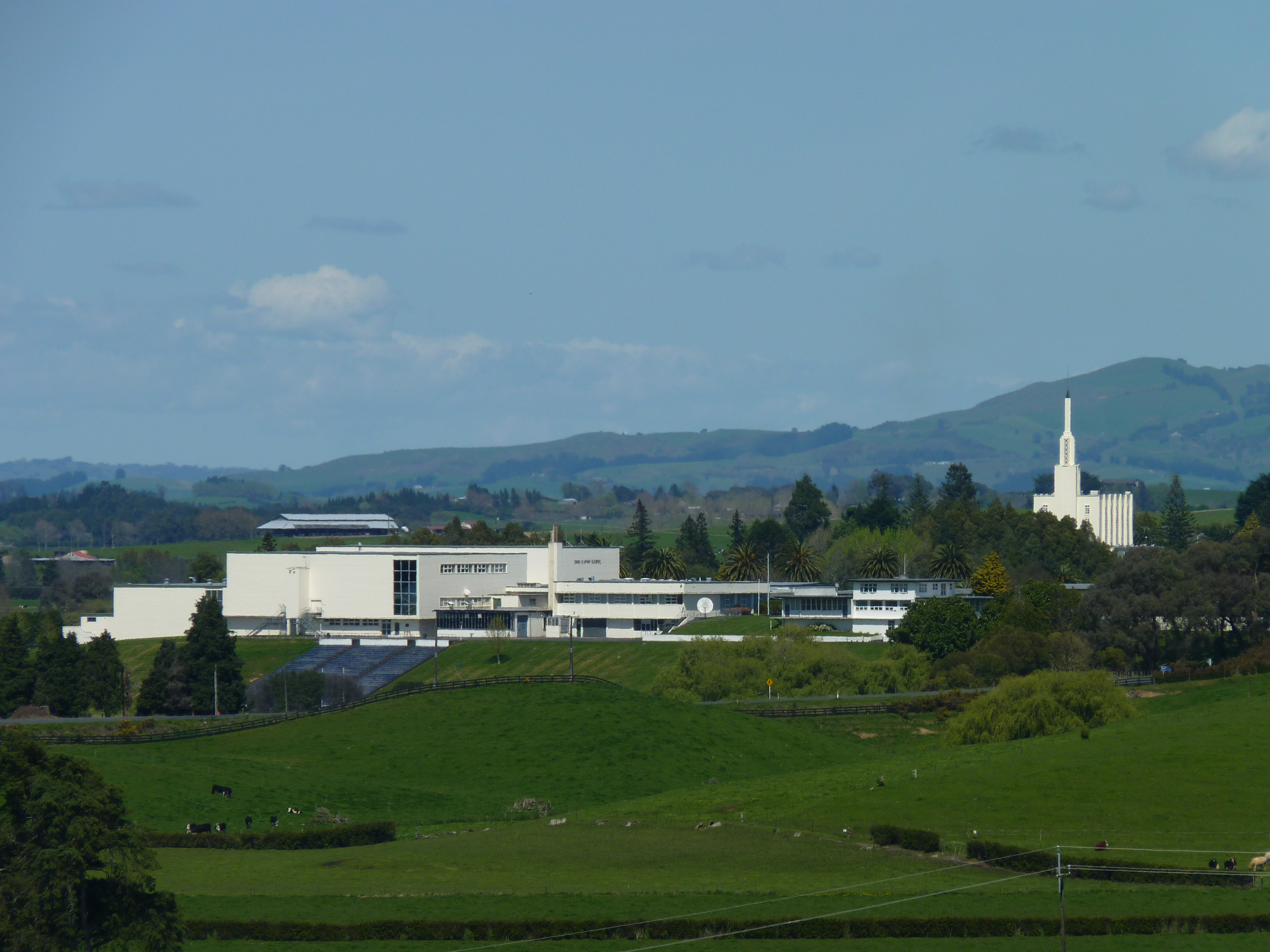
- Church College campus, with Hamilton New Zealand Temple in background

Location
- Tuhikaramea Road, Temple View, Hamilton; 37.8204°S 175.2277°E

Information
- Type: Private, Co-educational, Secondary Years 9–13
- Motto: Build Now for Eternity
- Established: 1958
- Ministry of Education Institution no.: 128
- Principal: Lloyd Keung
- Enrolment: 394
- Socio-economic decile: 5
- Website: ccnzaa.org

Church College of New Zealand (CCNZ) was a private secondary school in Temple View, Hamilton, New Zealand, that was operated by the Church Educational System of the Church of Jesus Christ of Latter-day Saints (LDS Church). It was closed at the end of the 2009 school year.

== History ==
The church had opened the Maori Agricultural College in 1913. When the MAC was destroyed in the 1931 Napier earthquake, there were plans to build a new school and construction of CCNZ began in 1952.

In 1955, the LDS Church announced that it would construct a temple in Hamilton. LDS Church president David O. McKay initially went to New Zealand to downsize the building programme. After visiting the project, McKay was so impressed with what he saw and felt he decided to add two more buildings to the school's construction. These buildings were later named the David O. McKay Auditorium and the Matthew Cowley Administration Building. CCNZ and the New Zealand Temple were built on the same 35 hectare site, in what later became known as Temple View, a suburb of Hamilton. Both facilities were built entirely by LDS Church volunteer labour missionaries. CCNZ was dedicated and formally opened on 26 April 1958 by McKay. Clifton D. Boyack was the school's first principal.

=== Construction ===
The first visit to a property in the area occurred in 1950. The mission president, Gordon C.Young, drove out to the area, and when first seeing the site as he drove over a nearby hill where he pictured in his mind white buildings on the property and immediately felt this was the place the LDS Church was to build a school. He arranged to acquire the property the same day. He specifically stated many times that he did not ever see the temple on the property in vision because he had only been given the assignment to find property and also that only the LDS Church president could propose sites for a new temple. Church representatives from Utah came and inspected the property, and members of the church from all over New Zealand slowly moved into the area to work as labor missionaries on the project.

Before work commenced on the school, the surrounding property began to be developed, including accommodations for the people who came to work were built, and a social infrastructure was established. Initially, there were only a few people at the site. Much of the surrounding land was peat, and it took some ingenuity to make the land agriculturally productive. Over 200 acres of land were bought for the college and foundations were laid in 1951. The temple foundations were put in place after McKay selected the site while visiting the college building work.

Many of the existing buildings were used as temporary quarters for those participating in construction and administration. Cottages were built to house the building missionaries when they arrived. Dormitory-type accommodations were provided for the single men. Food was sent in from the church members in other parts of the country, and some of it was grown locally.

A stream ran across the property behind the men's accommodation and behind their eating house. In the winters it always flooded so the men's accommodation and some of the cottages were usually semi-submerged in water at the time. A young child drowned in the stream so for safety concrete piping was brought in for protection, and to seal the stream.

The concrete bricks for the school buildings were manufactured locally by a special crew of building missionaries. There were specialist plumbing, electrical, painting, welding, mechanic and other crews for the construction of the many facilities. Supervisors for these crews were called from the U.S. They came with their families, and helped greatly with the overall communal life of the building missionaries. The building missionaries were exposed to the way the LDS Church did things in the U.S., and this helped facilitate the transition of the LDS Church in New Zealand from its mission status to the stake and ward system.

== Enrolment ==
The school taught students in New Zealand's educational years nine through thirteen (13- to 18-year-olds). While in operation there were approximately 700 students and 100 faculty/staff members, until its last year, when the student body was 120 students and 50 staff members. A modest tuition was charged but the school is heavily subsidized by the LDS Church. In 2009, approximately 10% of Latter Day Saint high school students in New Zealand attended Church College, with some attending the school away from home as a boarding school.

== Closure ==
On 29 June 2006, LDS Church leaders announced that CCNZ would cease accepting new students in 2007 and would close at the end of the 2009 school year; in discussing its decision, a church policy to close its private secondary schools when the public school system is able to offer "quality education" was cited.

== Proposed plans ==
After it was closed, LDS Church leaders had planned to demolish parts of the school site and convert it into farmland. These plans were challenged by some of the Temple View community and CCNZ alumni. Robert Cammock, president of the Temple View Heritage Society, proposed that the Temple View community should decide the future of the school.

The LDS Church later decided that demolition of key buildings was no longer on the agenda and formally withdrew its application from the local city council. It indicated that several options were being investigated for future usage.

Although some historic buildings were repurposed, much of the college was demolished in 2018 and it was planned to replace it with about 200 houses.

== See also ==
- Academia Juárez
