= Te Kere Ngatai-e-rua =

New Zealand tohunga

Te Kere Ngatai-e-rua (?–1901) was a notable New Zealand tohunga. Of Māori descent, he identified with the Te Ati Haunui-a-Paparangi iwi.
