= Te Paea Tīaho =

Te Paea Tīaho (c. 1820s – 22 January 1875), sometime known by Pākehā as Princess Sophia, was a daughter of the first Māori King, Pōtatau Te Wherowhero, and a leader in the Māori King Movement in New Zealand. A member of the Ngāti Mahuta tribe, she was probably born in the Waikato in the early 1820s. When her father died in 1860, Te Paea was one of the individuals put forward to succeed him as leader of the King Movement, but her brother Matutaera (Tāwhiao) was chosen instead. She continued to play a leadership role within the King Movement. Te Paea Tīaho's husband was Ēpiha Pūtini, a prominent Ngāti Tamaoho chief.
