= Orongokoekoea Pā =

Hill site near Te Kūiti, New Zealand

Coordinates: 38°35′3.86″S 175°11′33.98″E

Orongokoekoeā Pā is a hill site located south of Te Kūiti, about halfway to Taumarunui, in the King Country region of New Zealand. It is named after the long-tailed cuckoo (koekoeā), which inhabits the area during the summer months. Orongokoekoeā is the site of an ancient Maori hill fortress (pā) belonging to the Ngāti Matakore tribe of the Ngāti Maniapoto tribal area. Pōtatau Te Wherowhero (later the first Māori king) and his Waikato iwi retreated here and stayed for several years after they were defeated by musket-armed Ngāpuhi led by Hongi Hika in a battle at Matakitaki (Pirongia) in 1822. Te Wherowhero's son Tāwhiao, the second Maori King, was born at Orongokoekoeā in about 1825.
