= Wendell B. Mendenhall =

American LDS Church leader (1907–1978)

Wendell Bird Mendenhall (September 26, 1907 – September 14, 1978) was the head of the Church Building Department of the Church of Jesus Christ of Latter-day Saints (LDS Church) and one of the moving forces behind the Labor Missionary program of the LDS Church in the 1950s. Mendenhall was largely the father of the Polynesian Cultural Center in Hawaii. He was also the building supervisor for the Oakland California Temple in the 1960s.

== Biography ==
Mendenhall was born in Mapleton, Utah and graduated from Springville High School. He then attended both Utah State University and Brigham Young University. Mendenhall served as a Mormon missionary in New Zealand from 1927 to 1930.

He was then involved in various business ventures mainly in California and served as bishop of the Stockton Ward of the LDS Church.

When Mendenhall was first given the assignment to select a temple site in New Zealand by David O. McKay, he was serving as president of the San Joaquin Stake in California.

Mendenhall was the person who went to such countries as Tonga and recruited local members who were called as labor missionaries to assist in building the Polynesian Cultural Center. He was then until the mid-1960s closely connected with Henry D. Moyle in the acquisition of land and the building of a large number of chapels and other buildings for the LDS Church.

In 1978 Mendenhall died at the age of 70 from a heart attack.
