= Tomairangi Paki =

Sister of Māori King

- Born: 1953; Huntly, New Zealand
- Died: 3 April 2017 (aged 63)
Names
- Kiritokia e-te Tomairangi Adrianne Gail Paki
- Father: Whatumoana Paki
- Mother: Te Arikinui Dame Te Atairangikaahu

Kiritokia e-te Tomairangi Paki (1953 – 3 April 2017) was a prominent Māori kuia, and the daughter of Queen Te Arikinui Dame Te Atairangikaahu. She was the elder sister of King Tūheitia.

Paki was a prominent exponent of kapa haka, and tutored the Taniwharau kapa haka to national victory in 1981. She received a life membership award from Tainui Cultural Trust for her work within kapa haka in 2016.

Paki won a scholarship to learn world dances and choose to study Hawaiian Hula. She spent several years in Hawaii and became a Kumu Hula and returned to New Zealand establishing her own hālau (hula school) called Nā Keiki O Ka ʻĀina.

She was a patron for He Kura Te Tangata, a festival which celebrates kaumatua and kapa haka.

Paki died peacefully in her sleep on 3 April 2017. Her tangi was held at Waahi Pa in Huntly where her body lay in state before being taken for burial at the royal cemetery at Mount Taupiri.
