= Pāoa =

Maori chieftain

Rangatira Pāoa
- Born: First half of the seventeenth century Waikato, New Zealand
- Known for: Tribal leader of Ngāti Pāoa iwi

Pāoa was a Māori rangatira (chieftain) of the Tainui tribal confederation from the Waikato region, New Zealand. He is the ancestor of the Ngāti Pāoa iwi. He probably lived in the first half of the seventeenth century.

== Life ==
According to Tainui sources reported by Pei Te Hurinui Jones, Pāoa was the son of Hekemaru and Heke-i-te-rangi. Hekemaru's mother was Rerei-ao of Mount Pirongia, a descendant of Hoturoa, the captain of the Tainui canoe through multiple lines. Hekemaru's father, Pikiao had come from Rotorua to the Waikato in search of a wife who could give him a male heir. Through him, Pāoa was descended from Tama-te-kapua, the captain of the Arawa canoe. Pāoa's older sister, Pare-tahuri, and his older brother, Mahuta, were the ancestors of Ngāti Mahuta.

Hauraki sources reported by George Grey, John White and George Graham give a very different genealogy, in which Pāoa was a member of the East Coast iwi, Ngāti Kahungunu, born to Rongo-tiu-moe-whara at Whai-a-pāoa near Wharekahika. In this version, Pāoa was first married at Whai-a-pāoa, but he had a fight with his wife and she fled. He set out with a party to try and find her, vowing to return with her or not at all. He travelled past Lake Taupō, along the Tongariro River, through to Taranaki, and up the Waikato River. When he came to the village of Mahuta and the people heard his story, they were shocked at the idea of someone travelling so far in search of a wife and persuaded him to marry a local woman.

=== Residence in Waikato ===
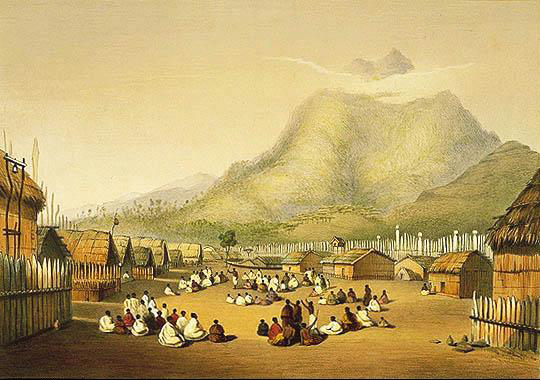
Kaitotehe, the pā of Pōtatau Te Wherowhero, with Mount Taupiri in the background (Angas 1846)

After Pāoa married Tau-hākari, he made his base at Kaitotehe on the west bank of the Waikato River, opposite Mount Taupiri. According to the Tainui version, the location of the village meant that it was very rich, but also received a lot of visitors and therefore there were sometimes shortages of food. One day, Mahuta happened to visit unexpectedly and Pāoa was unable to provide him with food. According to the Hauraki version, Pāoa fell in love with one of his slaves, married her, and lived with her in poverty, while Tau-hākari lived elsewhere and enjoyed substantial kumara harvests. After three years, relatives of Tau-hākari came to visit, expecting eels, but the only food the pair had to offer their guests were mamaku fronds, mauku sprouts, wharangi leaves and karamu berries. Therefore, Pāoa sent his new wife to try and get some kumara from Tau-hākari, but she refused. In both versions, Pāoa was so ashamed by this that he abandoned his family and left Waikato.

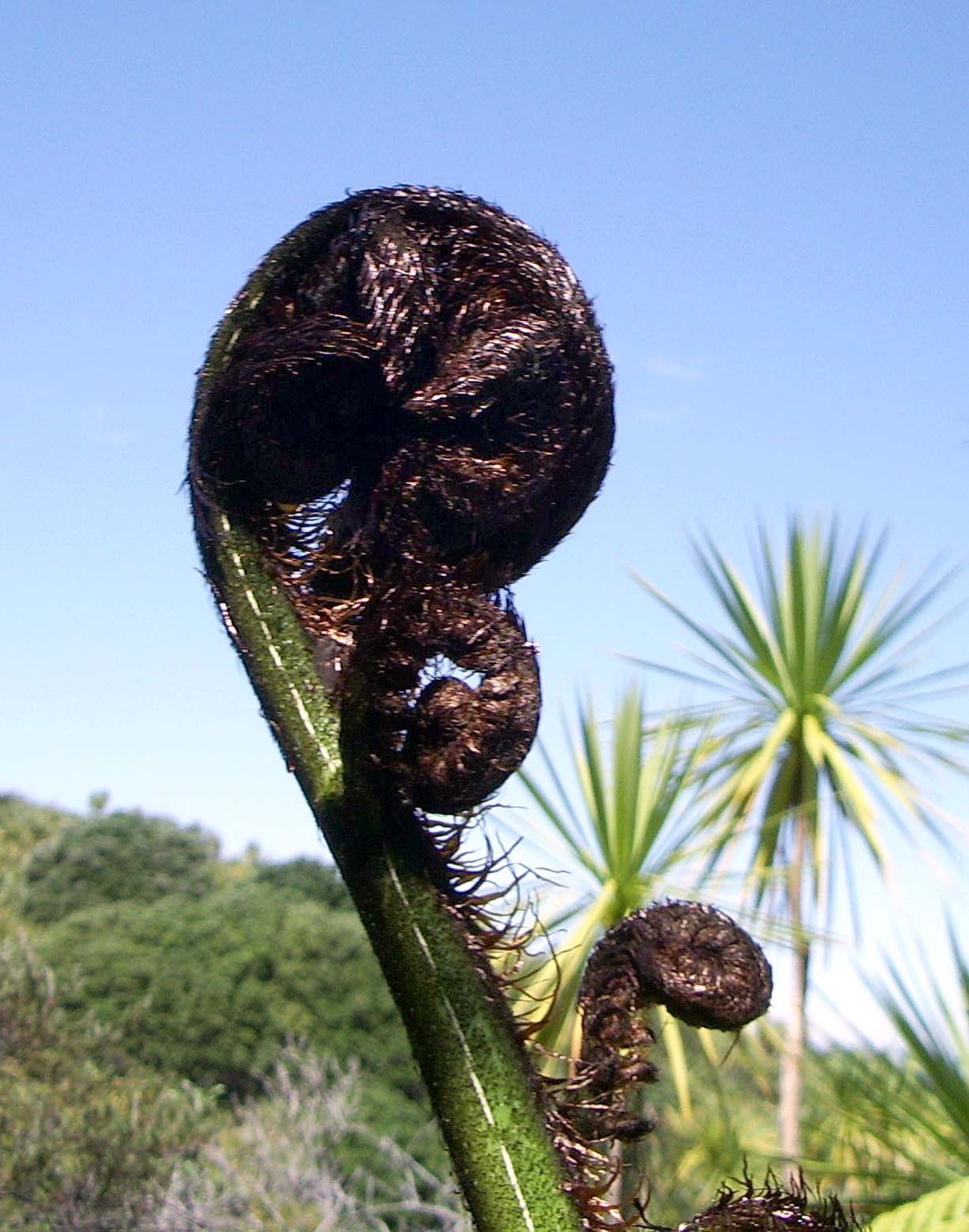
Mamaku ('black tree fern') frond.

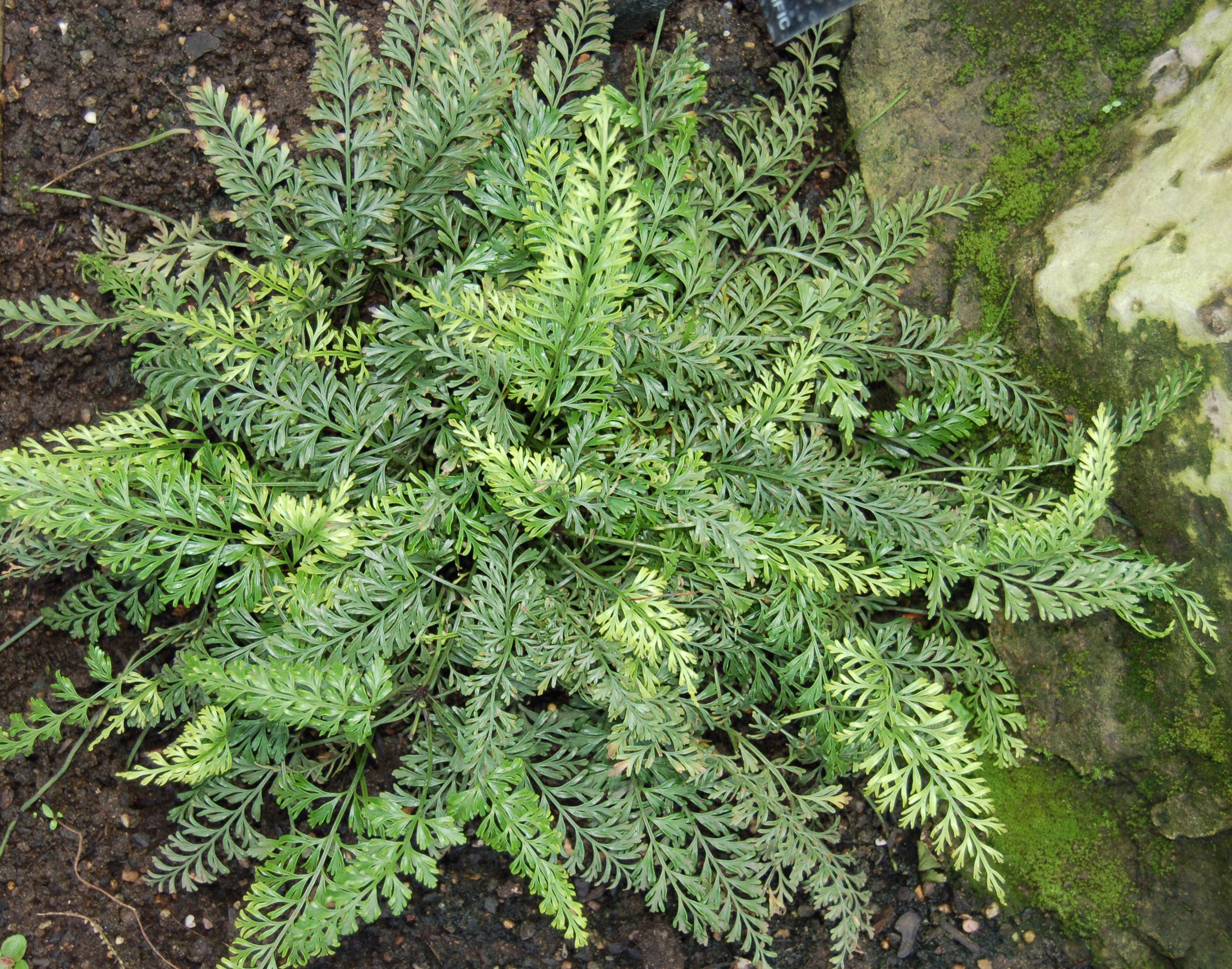
Mauku ('hen and chicken fern').

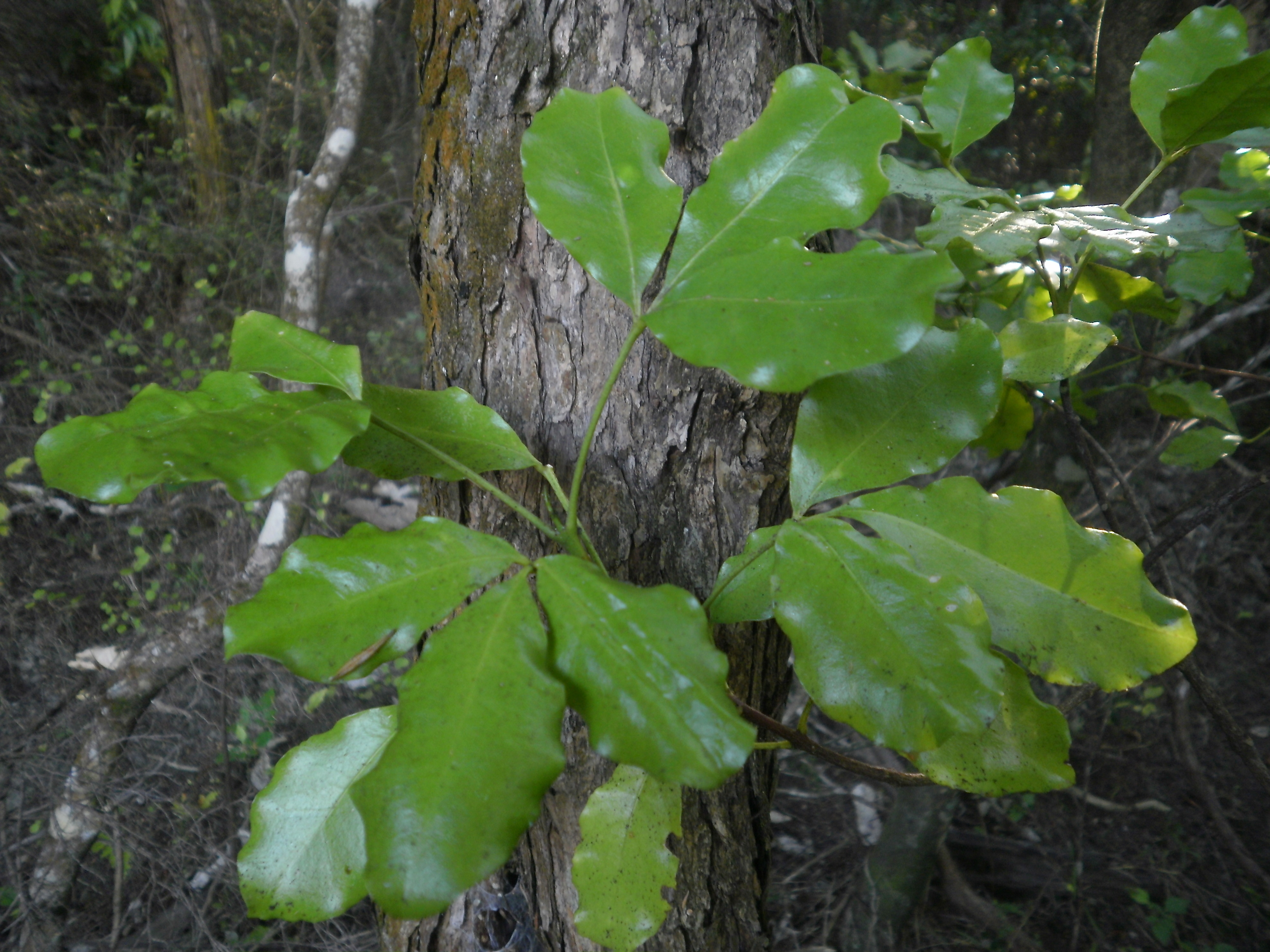
Wharangi plant.

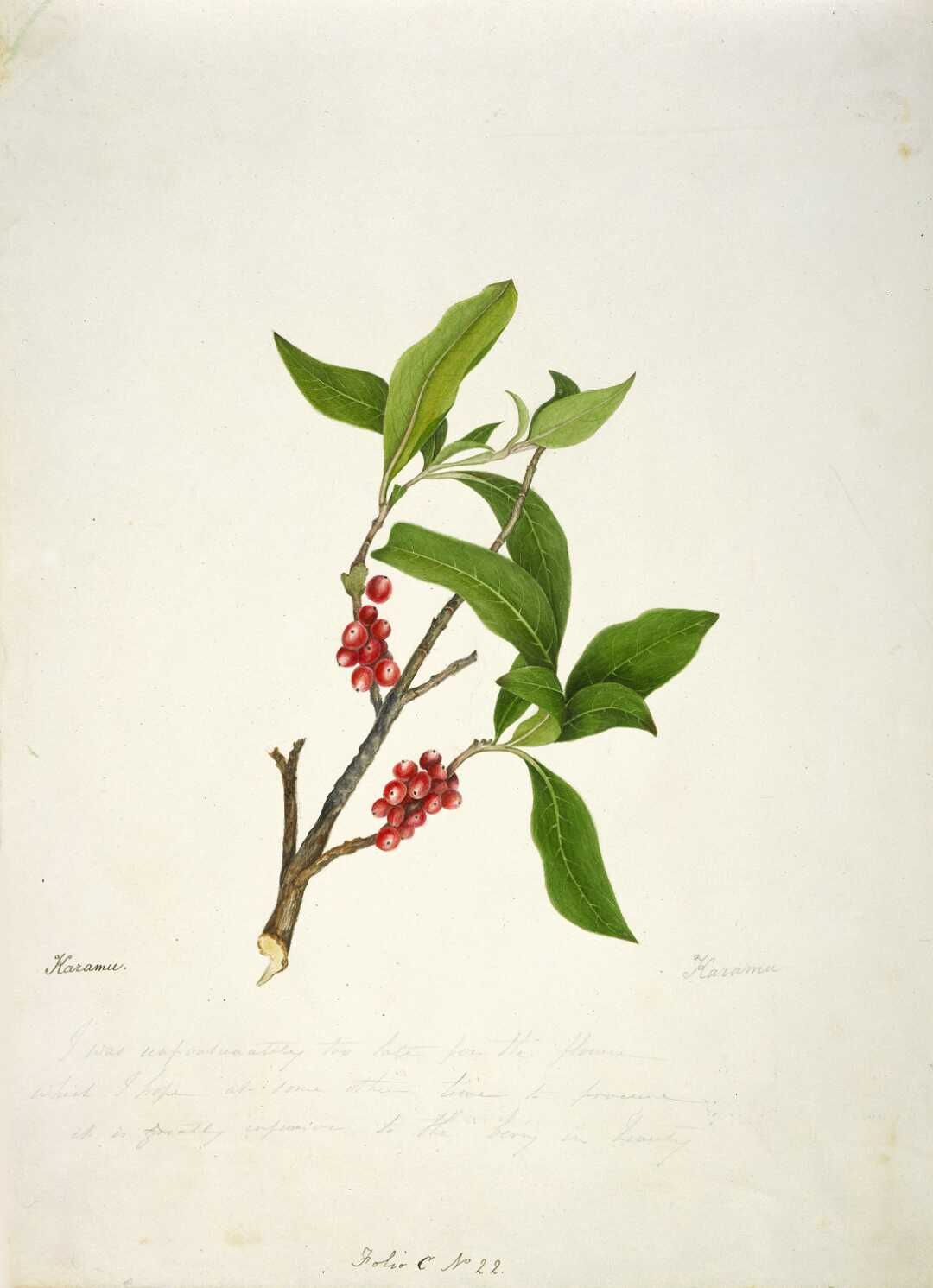
Karamu plant in fruit. Painting by Martha King, 1842.

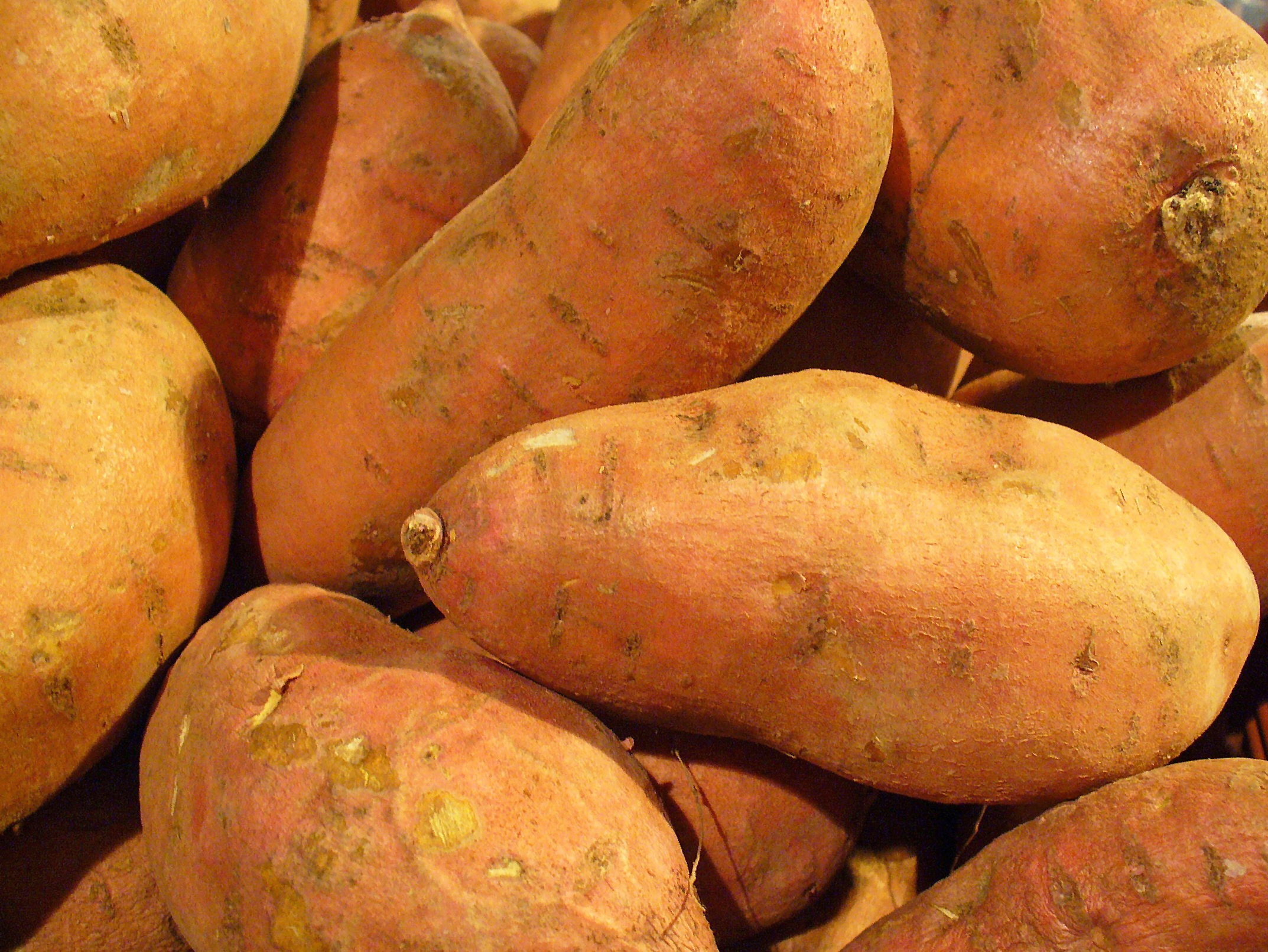
Kumara tubers.

=== Migration to Hauraki ===
Pāoa's journey from Waikato to Hauraki.
1 Kaitotehe
2 Tikitiki-maurea, Hapuakohe Range
3 Ruawehea (Paeroa)
4 Waiau
5 Tararu

Pāoa led a party up the Mangawara Stream, crossing the Hapuakohe Range at Tikitiki-maurea, and reached the Piako River at Mirimiri-rau, where the local people treated him to hospitality for many months.

During this period, some of Pāoa's men visited another village, Rua-wehea (Paeroa), where a young virgin, Tukutuku, took an interest in him. She was the daughter of the rangatira Taharua, who was son of Tama-te-rā, the founder of Ngāti Tamaterā and grandson of Marutūāhu. Pāoa discovered this and, after the kumara harvest in autumn, he took his whole party down the Piako River to the Hauraki Gulf and then up the Waihou River to Rua-wehea with his whole party.

Pāoa travelled in a shoddy pūreke, a rain cape made of cabbage tree leaves, while all his companions were dressed in fine clothes, and he went straight to the guesthouse. The people presented him with ika paruparu ('fermented shellfish') in order to test him. Rather than eat the good quality food, he ate the common food in a greedy manner so as to appear to be an uncouth person. This behaviour inspired the proverbial saying, "as greedy as a Ngāti Pāoa." Despite all of this, the people recognised him as a chiefly person. Although Tukutuku cared for the guests diligently for three days, Pāoa never emerged from the guesthouse. When it was announced that Pāoa was going to depart, Tukutuku appealed to Pāoa directly and he rebuffed her. He behaved in this fashion because he was worried that Tukutuku's parents would not allow the match and that they might have him and his party killed if he slept with Tukutuku. But she was so distraught at his behaviour that her parents arranging for the couple to be married. A raiding party made up of the other men who had sought to marry Tukutuku came to attack Pāoa because he had not held a marriage feast and distributed gifts to them, but Taharua refused to allow this, insisting that they raid his property instead.

Pāoa travelled with his new wife around her tribal lands, visiting Waiau and Tararu, and then returned to Mirimiri-rau, where she taught the local people to harvest the roots of the whanake (cabbage tree), the pohue (bindweed), the raupō (bulrush), and the aruhe (bracken fern), and to collect kākahi (fresh-water mussels). They had ten sons, including Tipa and Hao-whenua.

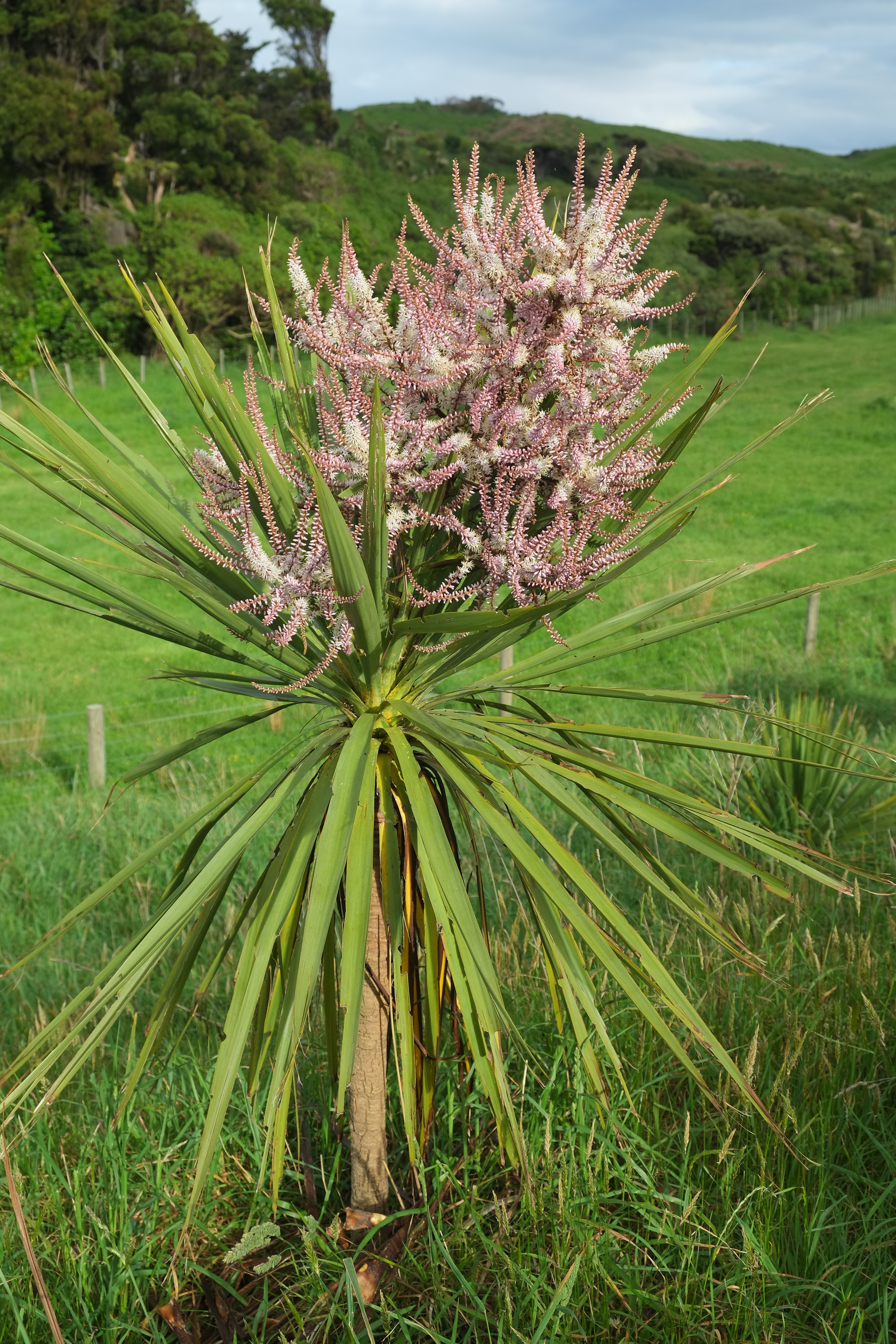
Whanake (cabbage tree)

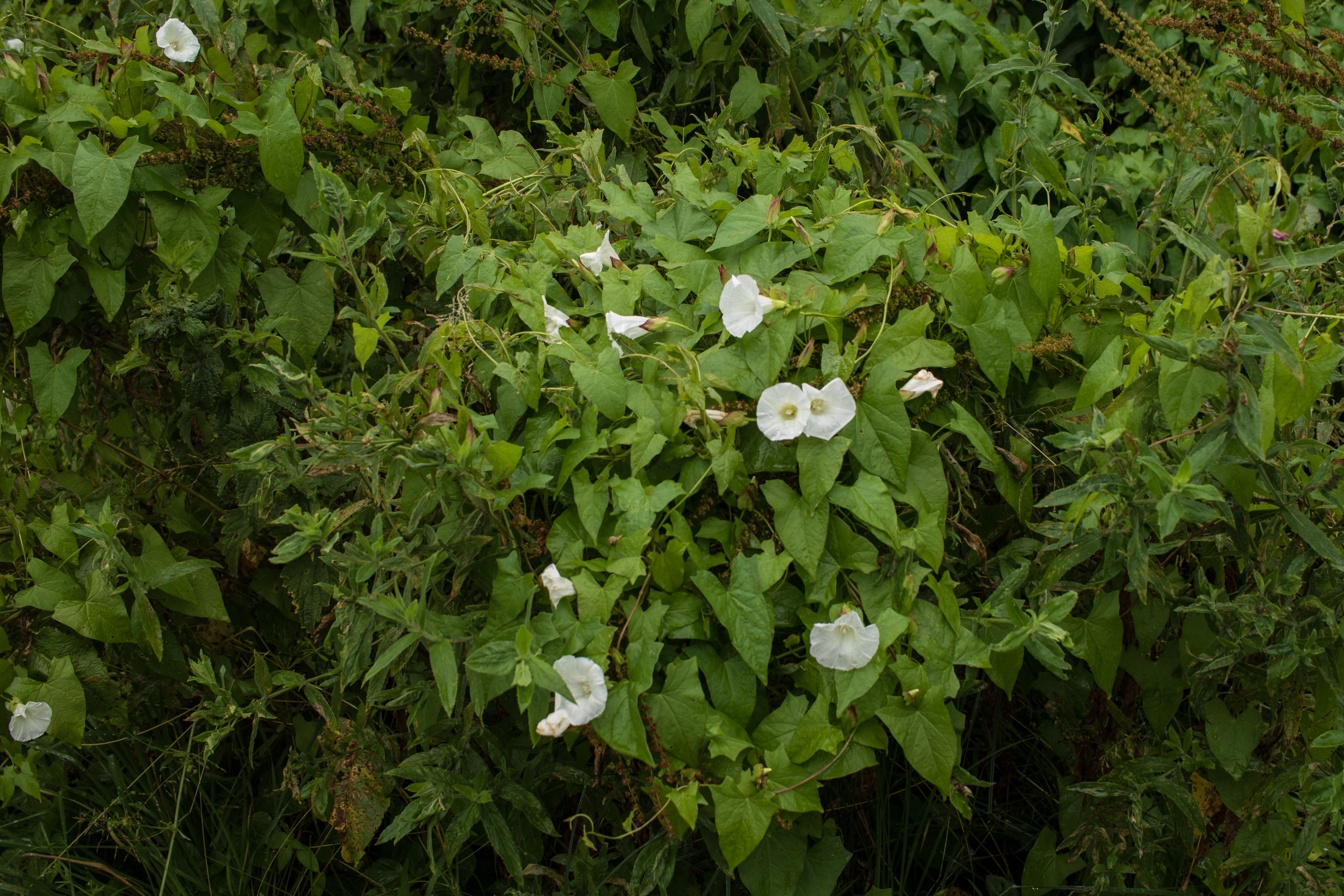
Pohue (bindweed)

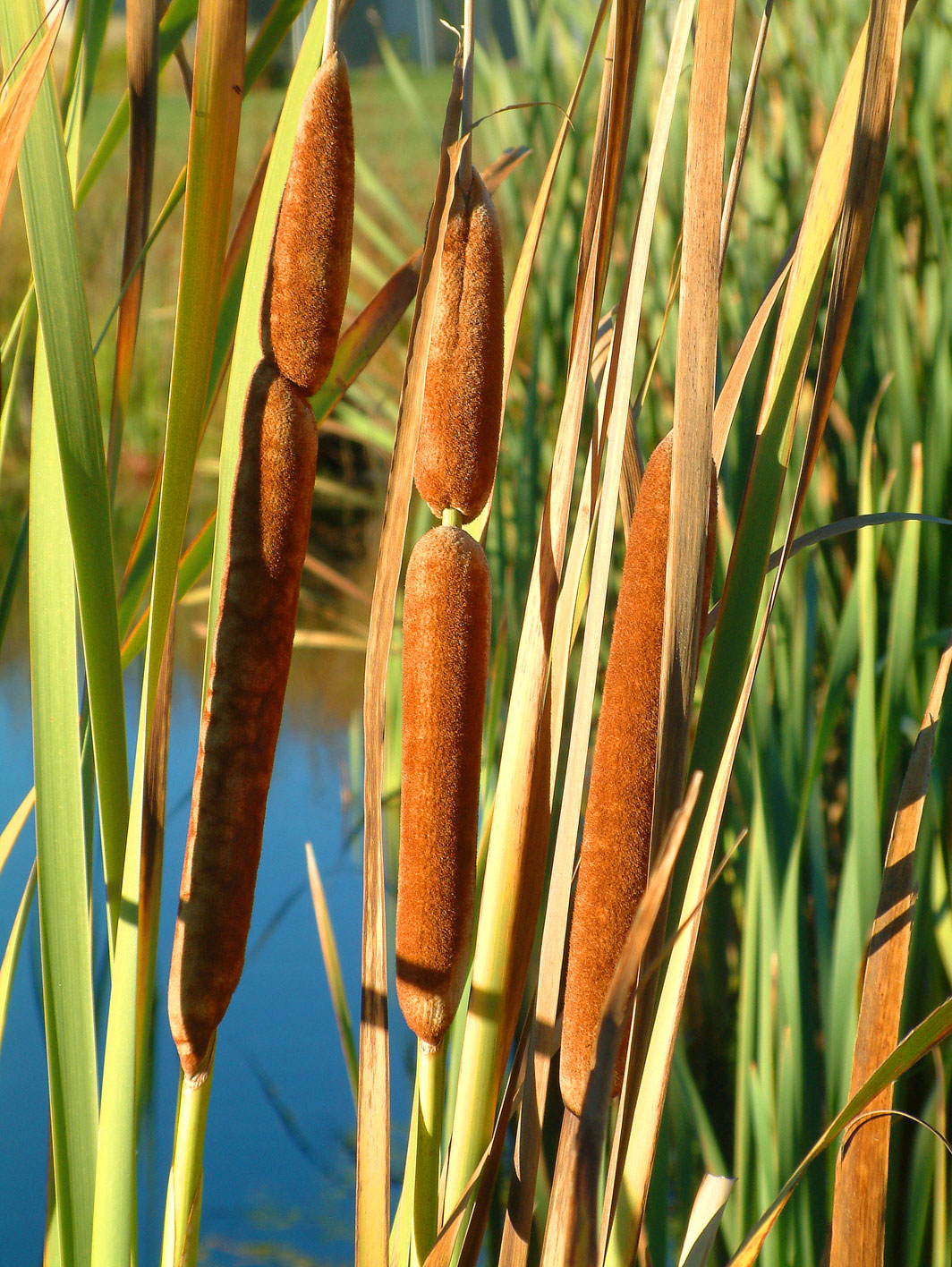
Raupō (bulrush),

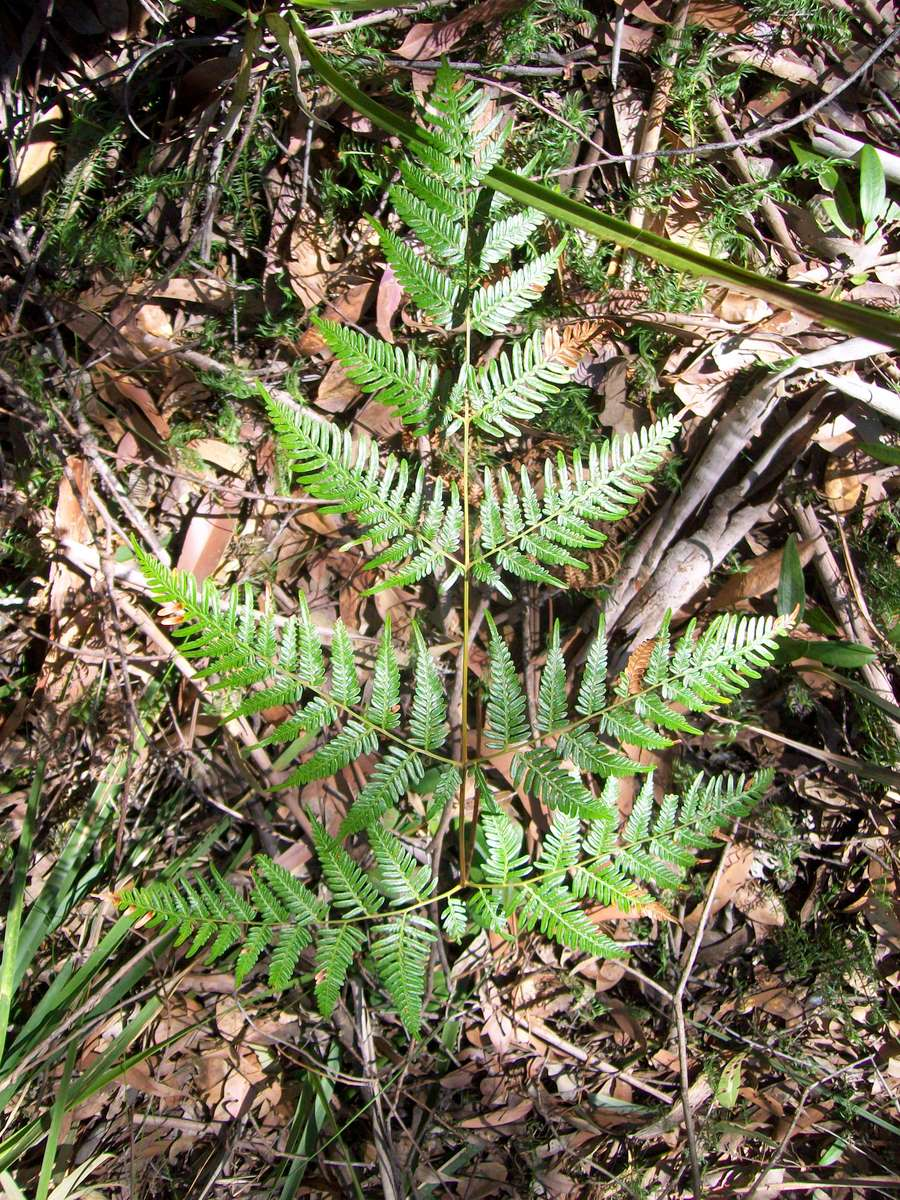
Aruhe (bracken fern)

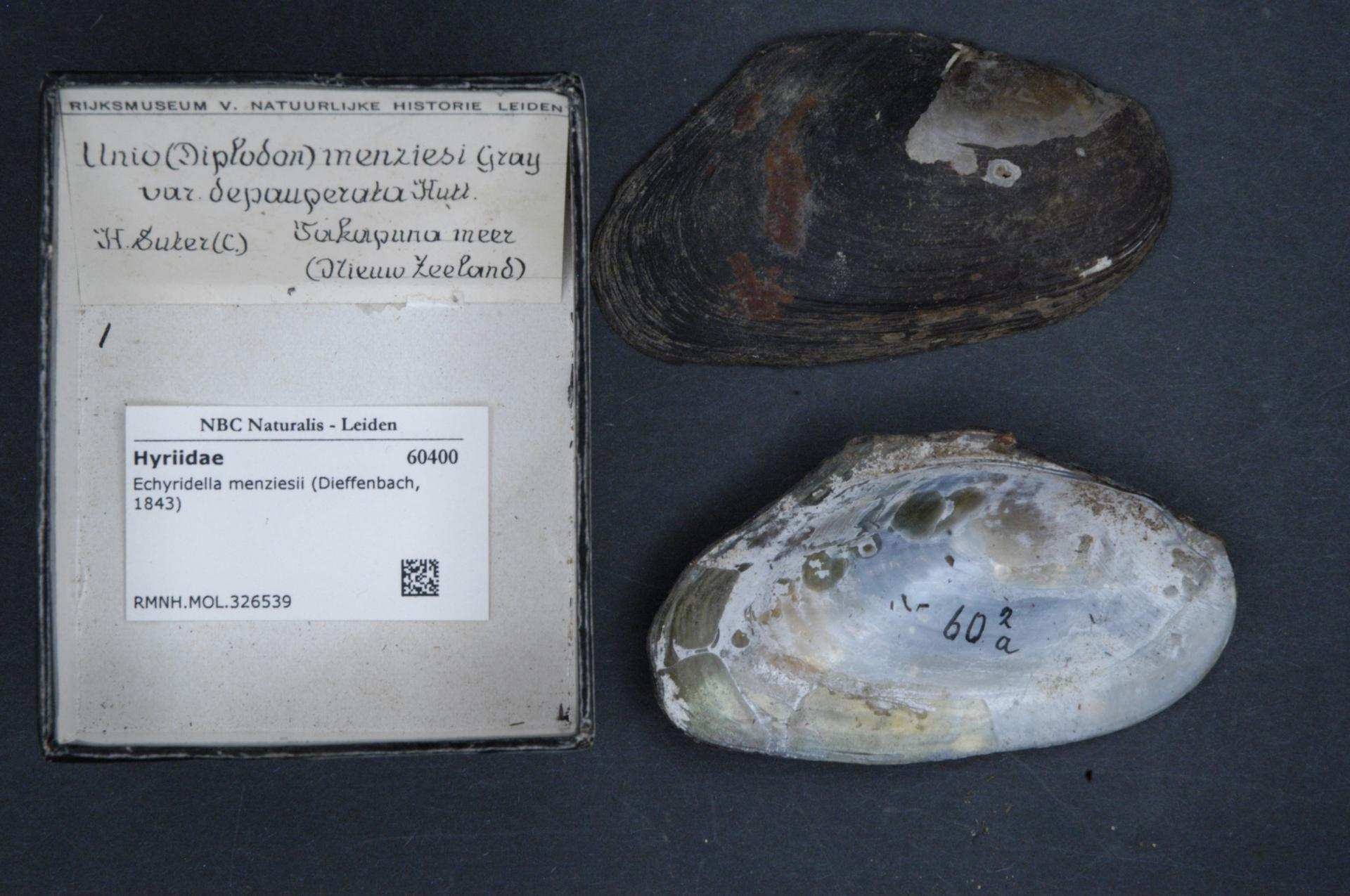
kākahi (fresh-water mussels)

=== Return to Waikato ===
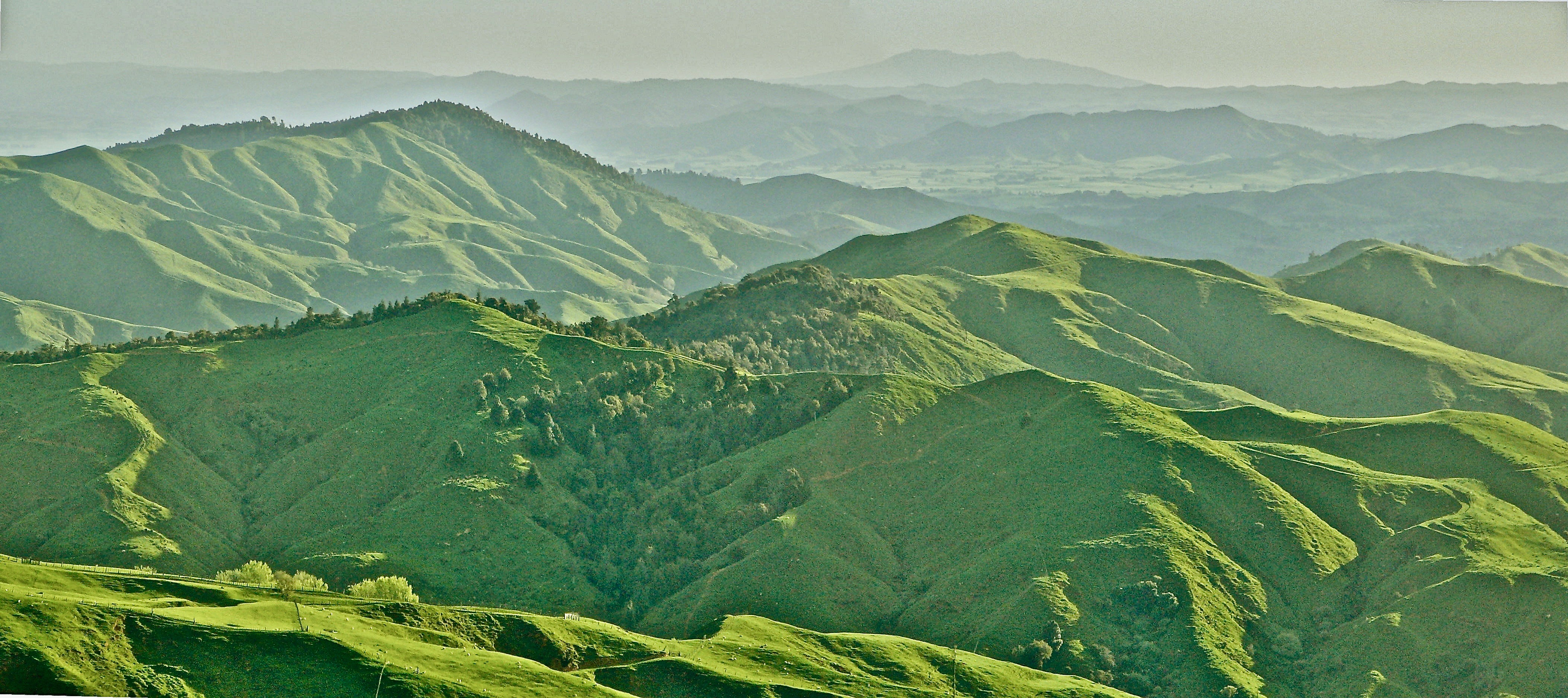
View into the Waikato from the Hapuakohe Range.

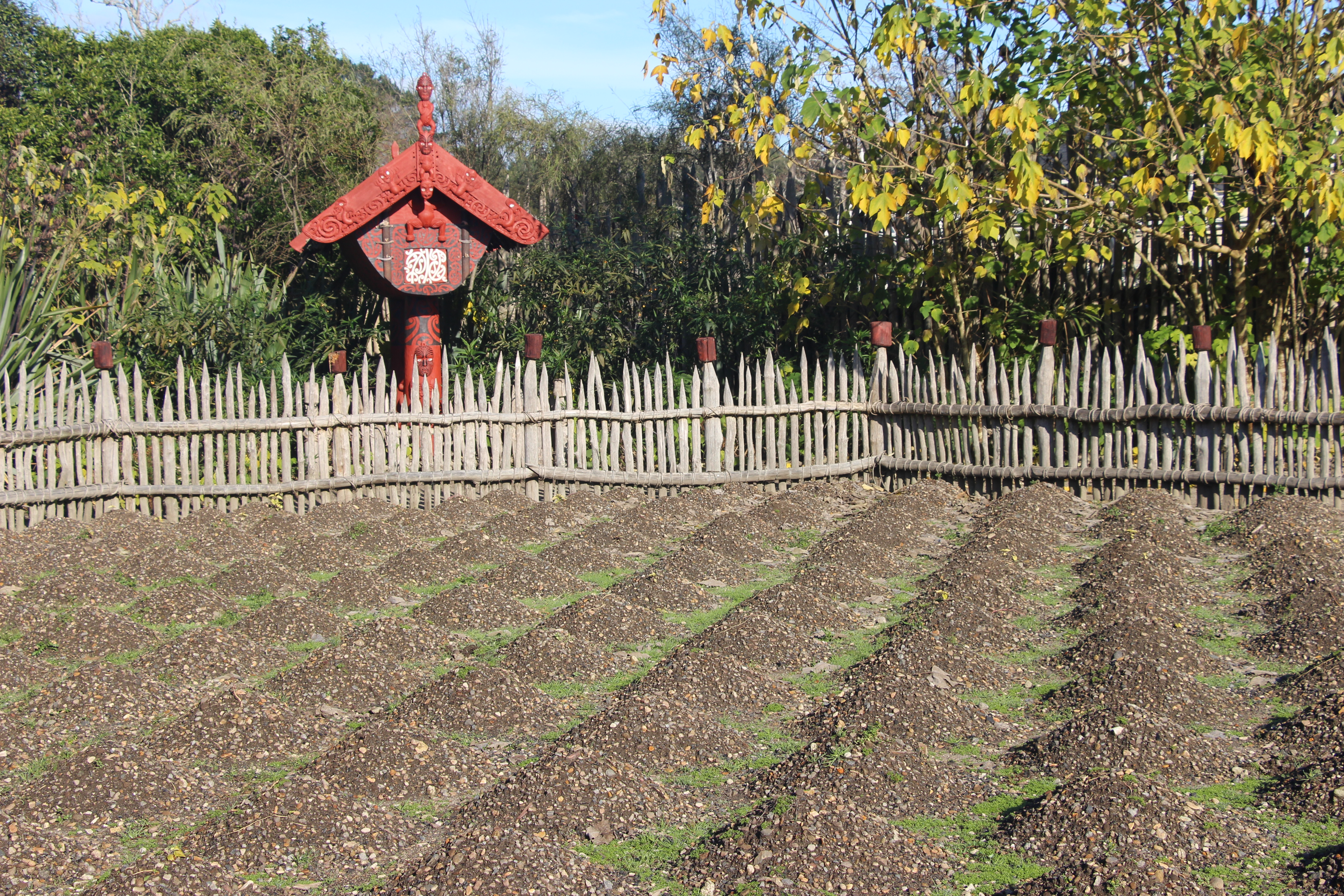
Te Parapara, a traditional Māori kumara garden at Hamilton Gardens.

In his old age, Pāoa wished to return to Waikato and see his children by his first wife. Tipa and Hao-whenua argued about whether to let him go, but Tipa convinced Hao-whenua to let him to make the journey, as long as he returned within five days. When Pāoa reached Tikitiki-maurea in the Hapuakohe Range and looked down into the Waikato, he wept to see the river and the smoke from his sons' village. Arriving at the village of Wai-tāwheta, Pāoa was welcomed by his grown sons Toa-whane and Toa-poto. As Hao-whenua had predicted, the sons immediately told him to sing karakia ('incantations') for their kumara crop and declared that he would not be allowed to leave, so some members of Pāoa's party snuck away and reported to Hao-whenua that Pāoa was being held captive.

Hao-whenua gathered a war-party to recover his father. As a result of an ominous dream, Tipa refused to join the venture and because of another dream, the party halted at Tikitiki-maurea, with Hao-whenua going on alone He found Pāoa just as he was finishing the karakia and left with him immediately (Pāoa realised that his firstborn sons would murder Hao-whenua if they caught him).

Toa-whane and his brothers gathered their own war party and set out in pursuit. Toa-whane caught up with the party at Tikitiki-maurea and Pāoa, who could not keep up the pace because of his age, begged Hao-whenua to leave him behind, but he did not. There was a battle, in which Hao-whenua fought and killed both Toa-whane and Toa-poto in single combat, after which their war-party broke and fled, harried on their way back to the Waikato by forces under the command of Tipa. Pāoa was brought back to Mirimiri-rau, where he later died.

== Family ==
Pāoa and Tau-hākari had two sons and a daughter:

- Toa-whane and Toa-poto, who were killed at Tikitiki-maurea
- Kōura, who married Ruru of Ngāti Hauā and was grandmother of Hotu-mauea.

Pāoa and Tukutuku had ten sons, including:

- Tipa (or Te Papa)
- Hao-whenua (or Horo-whenua)

A daughter, Hinemata, married Te Kete-iwi of Ngāti Wairere and had many children, including Toa-kōtara and Ngaere.

== Sources ==
There are two different traditions regarding Pāoa, one deriving from Hauraki sources and one from Tainui sources. They differ regarding his origins and life up to the departure from the Waikato, but are nearly identical thereafter. The Hauraki account of Pāoa appears George Grey's 1853 collection of Māori stories, Ko nga moteatea me nga hakirara o nga Maori, probably deriving from an account by Wiremu Hoeti of Ngāti Tamaterā (Marutūāhu). John White republished it in 1888 in The Ancient History of the Maori as the second of his two accounts of Pāoa.

Pei Te Hurinui Jones gives the Tainui account, but unusually he does not name his source. His version is very similar to the first account of Pāoa given by John White in The Ancient History of the Maori.

== Bibliography ==
- Graham, George (1949). "Pare Hauraki pare Waikato". Journal of the Polynesian Society. 58: 68–74.
- Grey, George (1885). Polynesian Mythology and Ancient Traditional History of the New Zealand Race. Auckland [N.Z.]: H. Brett.
- Jones, Pei Te Hurinui; Biggs, Bruce (2004). Ngā iwi o Tainui : nga koorero tuku iho a nga tuupuna = The traditional history of the Tainui people. Auckland [N.Z.]: Auckland University Press. ISBN 1869403312.
- White, John (1888). The Ancient History of The Maori, his Mythology and Traditions: Tai-Nui. Vol. 4. Wellington: Government Printer.
