= Tararua =

Tararua may refer to:

- Tararua Range, southern North Island of New Zealand
- Tararua District, south-eastern North Island of New Zealand
- Tararua Forest Park, New Zealand
- SS Tararua, a 19th-century ship
- Tararua (spider)

== See also ==
- Tararu, a township on Coromandel Peninsula, New Zealand
