= Maungakawa =

Coordinates: 37.81°S 175.58°E

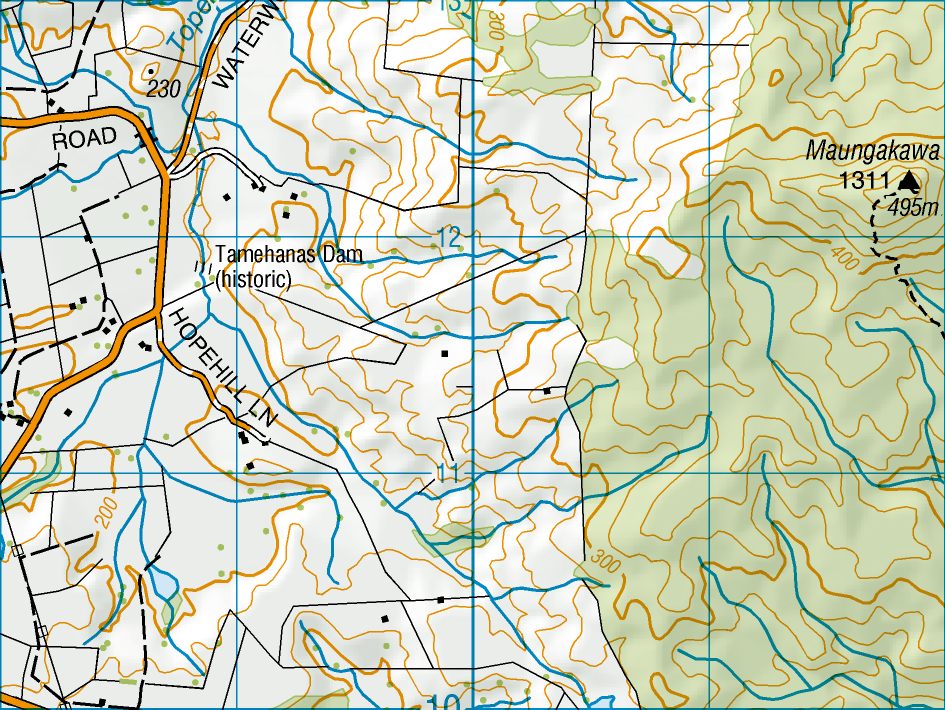
Topographic map of Maungakawa

Maungakawa is a former Mãori village located in the foothills of Maungakawa Hill, north of the town of Cambridge. It was once the meeting place of the Kauhanganui, the parliament of the Kīngitanga and Waikato Tainui government.

== History ==
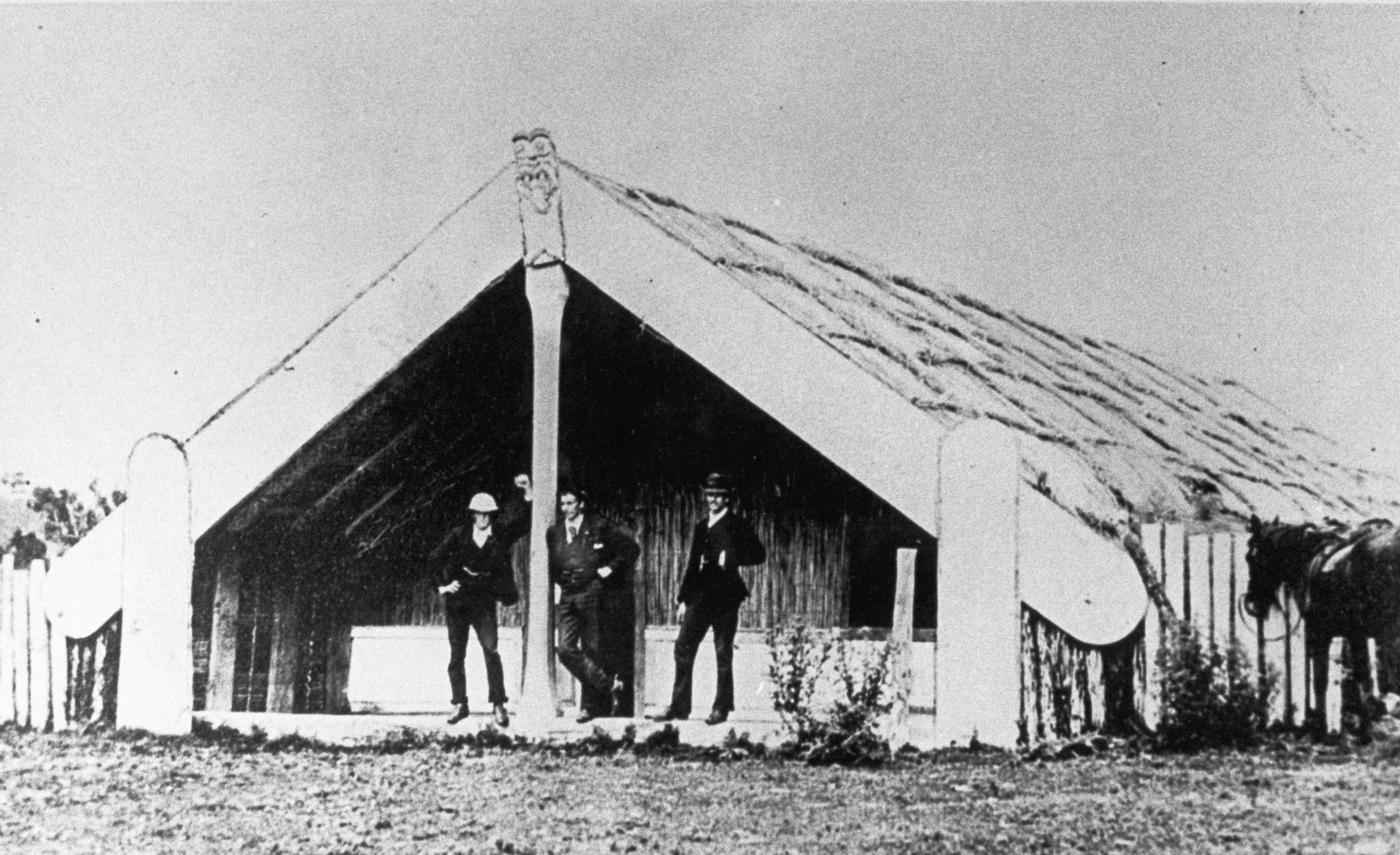
The original parliament building at Maungakawa

Maungakawa is theorised to not have been occupied prior to European arrival due to a lack of archaeological evidence and the belief that the Maungakawa Hills formed a buffer between Waikato and Hauraki Mãori. Ngāti Hauā occupied the surrounding area after Te Waharoa defeated Ngati Maru at the battle of Taumatawiwi (Note: Near Karapiro) in 1830. The agricultural settlements of Maungakawa and Peria were established by Wiremu Tamihana, Te Waharoa's son. The Mangatatariki Creek was dammed in 1852 to provide for a flourmill. This dam is known as Tamehanas Dam. During the 1860s Maungakawa had a population of several hundred Mãori, and had a cemetery. In May 1882 Te Paki o Matariki was published at Maungakawa as the official newspaper of the Maori king movement.

After King Tawhiao made peace with Governor George Grey he returned to Maungakawa and the settlement became the home of the Māori King movement. In 1891 a building, called the Maori Parliament Building, was opened by Tawhiao. The opening was attended by between 4,000 and 5,000. After returning from England after failing to have an audience with Queen Victoria, King Tawhiao convened a Māori parliament (Note: This parliament had no actual legal power or authority) at Maungakawa in 1894. Māori travelled from all across the country for this parliament.

An influenza epidemic between 1895 and 1896 led the village being depopulated and ultimately abandoned. In 1898 the parliament building was damaged in a fire and later demolished, with the remains of the building buried in the Te Miro swamp and treated as sacred.

Some Ngati Haua moved to Kutea (Note: Near Waharoa) and following the destruction of the first parliament building constructed a new one. Later Ngati Haua moved to Rukumoana and built a third parliament building, though Heritage New Zealand say it is the second Kauhanganui, rebuilt after the 1898 fire. It was given a Category 1 listing in 1989.

== Geography ==
Maungakawa is located in the southern foothills of Maungakawa Hill. The precise location is not known but is around the north of the Te Konehu Block where it intersects with the Kiwitahi and Te Tapui blocks.

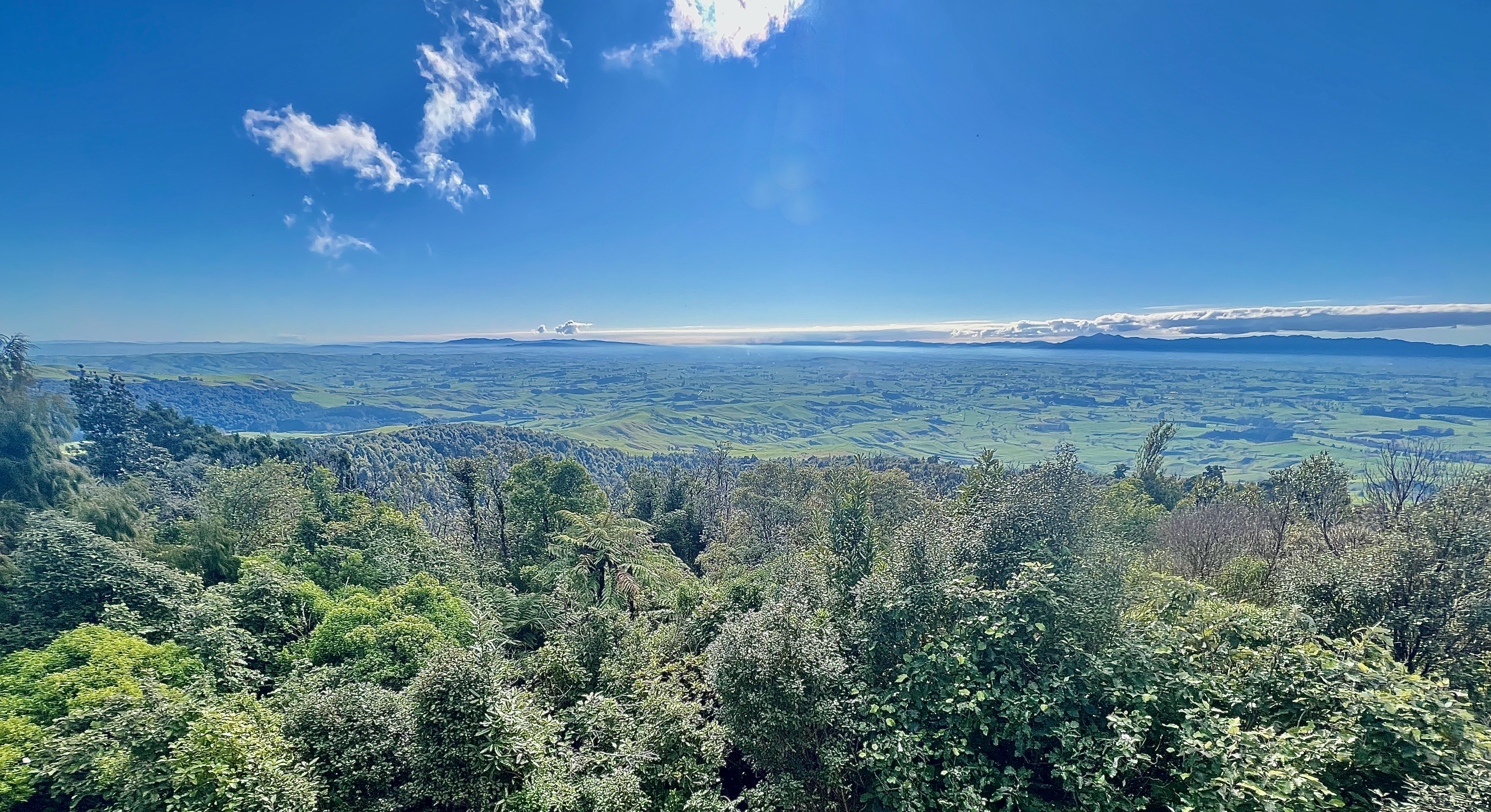
Hakarimata,Taupiri, Hapuakohe and Kaimai Ranges from Maungakawa

=== Maungakawa and Te Tapui hills ===
Above the historic site, 495 m (1,624 ft) Maungakawa hill is slightly higher than its 492 m (1,614 ft) neighbour, Te Tapui. Both are part of an uplifted horst, faulted along the edges, with later Miocene volcanic intrusion of Kiwitahi Volcanics in the form of andesite about 5.6 M y BP.

=== Te Tapui Loop Track ===
Te Tapui Loop Track climbs to the summit and lookout tower. It is 4 km (2.5 mi) long and classified by the Department of Conservation as an advanced track, requiring a "good level of fitness".

=== Vegetation ===
In 1959 Te Miro had Polystichum richardi, Ctenitis decomposita, Athyrium australe, Doodia media, Pellaea rotundifolia, Hypolepis rugosula, Hypolepis tenuifolia ferns, Pittosporum eugenioides, Melicytus micranthus, various small-leaved species of Coprosma, and of Paratrophis microphylla and, in a sphagnum bog, there were many sundews (Drosera binata), Pterostylis graminea orchid and Ranunculus rivularis. On a few dry sunny slopes Pteridium esculentum, Dianella intermedia, Leptospermum scoparium, Pomaderris phylicaefolia, Leucopogon fasciculatus, Coprosma robusta, wood rushes, and sedges grew. Low levels of grazing by fallow deer occur.
