= PNA =

PNA or Pna has a variety of meanings:

== Science and engineering ==
- abbreviation for orchid genus Paphinia
- Pacific–North American teleconnection pattern, a climatic phenomenon
- Parisiensia Nomina Anatomica, the revision of anatomic nomenclature
- Peanut agglutinin, a lectin specific for Gal-β(1–3)-GalNAc
- Peptide nucleic acid, an artificially synthesized polymer similar to DNA or RNA.
- Plastic neutral axis, an engineering value used in plastic section modulus
- Pottery Neolithic A, a division of the Pottery Neolithic period in archaeology

== Organizations ==
- Pakistan National Alliance
- Palestinian National Authority, an administrative autonomous government in parts of the West Bank and the Gaza Strip
- Partido Nacional Agrarista (National Agrarian Party), a Mexican left-wing agrarian political party founded in 1920
- Partidul Național-Agrar (National Agrarian Party), a Romanian right-wing agrarian political party active in the 1930s
- People's National Army
- Project for Nuclear Awareness, a non-profit organization that advocates for the abolition of nuclear weapons, co-founded by John C. Haas
- Polish National Alliance, a non-profit organization, the largest Polish – American Fraternal Benefit Society in USA offering life insurance and annuities. Founded in 1880, operates solely for the benefit of its members.
- Pa-O National Army
- Partido Nueva Alianza, the Spanish name for the New Alliance Party (Mexico)
- Parties to the Nauru Agreement
- Pennsylvania NewsMedia Association
- Philippine Nurses Association
- Prefectura Naval Argentina, the Spanish name for the Argentine Naval Prefecture
- National Anticorruption Directorate, Romania; formerly, National Anticorruption Prosecution Office (PNA)

== Computing ==
- HomePNA, a home-computer networking standard
- Personal navigation assistant (PNA)

== Other ==
- Pacific Northern Airlines, acquired by Western Airlines in 1967
- Pamplona Airport
- Partial nail avulsion, a treatment of ingrown toenails
- Philippine News Agency
- Prenuptial agreement, a marriage contract

== See also ==
- PNAS, Proceedings of the National Academy of Sciences of the United States of America
- PnaS, Phosphate-Sodium Symporter, a sodium/phosphate cotransporter
- Protected Natural Area (disambiguation)
