= Ecological districts of New Zealand =

In New Zealand an ecological district is defined as a particular geographical region that has a characteristic landscape and range of biological communities. They were developed after a need was seen for protected natural areas.

== List ==
Initially 268 ecological districts within 85 ecological regions were defined. At a later stage there was a reallocation of some of the ecological districts.

Ecological region	Ecological district	Code
Kermadec	Kermadec	1.01
Three Kings	Three Kings	2.01
Te Paki	Te Paki	3.01
Aupouri	Aupouri	4.01
Western Northland
Western Northland	Maungataniwha	5.01
Western Northland	Hokianga	5.02
Western Northland	Tutamoe	5.03
Western Northland	Tangihua	5.04
Eastern Northland
Eastern Northland	Eastern Northland and Islands	6.01
Eastern Northland	Taranga	6.02
Poor Knights	Poor Knights	7.01
Kaipara	Kaipara	8.01
Auckland
Auckland	Rodney	9.01
Auckland	Waitakere	9.02
Auckland	Tamaki	9.03
Auckland	Rangitoto	9.04
Auckland	Inner Gulf Islands	9.05
Auckland	Awhitu	9.06
Auckland	Manukau	9.07
Auckland	Hunua	9.08
Coromandel
Coromandel	Little Barrier	10.01
Coromandel	Great Barrier	10.02
Coromandel	Colville	10.03
Coromandel	Mercury Islands	10.04
Coromandel	Thames	10.05
Coromandel	Tairua	10.06
Coromandel	Waihi	10.07
Coromandel	Te Aroha	10.08
Coromandel	Mayor	10.09
Waikato
Waikato	Meremere	11.01
Waikato	Hapuakohe	11.02
Waikato	Hauraki	11.03
Waikato	Hamilton	11.04
Waikato	Hinuera	11.05
Waikato	Maungatautari	11.06
Waikato	Waipa	11.07
Tainui
Tainui	Raglan	12.01
Tainui	Kawhia	12.02
Tainui	Herangi	12.03
Northern Volcanic Plateau
Northern Volcanic Plateau	Motiti	13.01
Northern Volcanic Plateau	Tauranga	13.02
Northern Volcanic Plateau	Otanewainuku	13.03
Northern Volcanic Plateau	Rotorua	13.04
Northern Volcanic Plateau	White Island	13.05
Whakatane
Whakatane	Te Teko	14.01
Whakatane	Taneatua	14.02
Whakatane	Opotiki	14.03
Western Volcanic Plateau
Western Volcanic Plateau	Ranginui	15.01
Western Volcanic Plateau	Pureora	15.02
Western Volcanic Plateau	Tokoroa	15.03
Central Volcanic Plateau
Central Volcanic Plateau	Atiamuri	16.01
Central Volcanic Plateau	Taupo	16.02
Eastern Volcanic Plateau
Eastern Volcanic Plateau	Kaingaroa	17.01
Eastern Volcanic Plateau	Whirinaki	17.02
Tongariro	Tongariro	18.01
Raukumara
Raukumara	Waioeka	19.01
Raukumara	Motu	19.02
East Cape
East Cape	Pukeamaru	20.01
East Cape	Waiapu	20.02
East Cape	Turanga	20.03
Urewera
Urewera	Waimana	21.01
Urewera	Ikawhenua	21.02
Urewera	Waikaremoana	21.03
Wairoa
Wairoa	Tiniroto	22.01
Wairoa	Mahia	22.02
Wairoa	Waihua	22.03
King Country
King Country	Waitomo	23.01
King Country	Taumarunui	23.02
Taranaki
Taranaki	North Taranaki	24.01
Taranaki	Matemateāonga	24.02
Egmont	Egmont	25.01
Moawhango	Moawhango	26.01
Kaimanawa	Kaimanawa	27.01
Ruahine	Ruahine	28.01
Hawkes Bay
Hawkes Bay	Maungaharuru	29.01
Hawkes Bay	Heretaunga	29.02
Rangitikei	Rangitikei	30.01
Manawatu
Manawatu	Manawatu Plains	31.01
Manawatu	Foxton	31.02
Manawatu Gorge
Manawatu Gorge	Manawatu Gorge North	32.01
Manawatu Gorge	Manawatu Gorge South	32.02
Pahiatua
Pahiatua	Woodville	33.01
Pahiatua	Puketoi	33.02
Eastern Hawkes Bay	Eastern Hawkes Bay	34.01
Eastern Wairarapa	Eastern Wairarapa	35.01
Wairarapa Plains	Wairarapa Plains	36.01
Aorangi	Aorangi	37.01
Tararua	Tararua	38.01
Sounds-Wellington
Sounds-Wellington	Wellington	39.01
Sounds-Wellington	Cook Strait	39.02
Sounds-Wellington	Sounds	39.03
Sounds-Wellington	D'Urville	39.04
Richmond
Richmond	Pelorus	40.01
Richmond	Para	40.02
Richmond	Fishtail	40.03
Wairau
Wairau	Blenheim	41.01
Wairau	Wither Hills	41.02
Wairau	Grassmere	41.03
Wairau	Flaxbourne	41.04
Wairau	Hillersden	41.05
Inland Marlborough
Inland Marlborough	Waihopai	42.01
Inland Marlborough	Medway	42.02
Inland Marlborough	Bounds	42.03
Inland Marlborough	George	42.04
Molesworth
Molesworth	Sedgemere	43.01
Molesworth	Balaclava	43.02
Molesworth	Miromiro	43.03
Clarence
Clarence	Tapuaenuku	44.01
Clarence	Dillon	44.02
Clarence	Manakau	44.03
Kaikoura
Kaikoura	Kekerengu	45.01
Kaikoura	Aniseed	45.02
Kaikoura	Kowhai	45.03
North-West Nelson
North-West Nelson	West Whanganui	46.01
North-West Nelson	Wakamarama	46.02
North-West Nelson	Golden Bay	46.03
North-West Nelson	Totaranui	46.04
North-West Nelson	Heaphy	46.05
North-West Nelson	Wangapeka	46.06
North-West Nelson	Arthur	46.07
North-West Nelson	Karamea	46.08
North-West Nelson	Matiri	46.09
Nelson
Nelson	Motueka	47.01
Nelson	Moutere	47.02
Nelson	Bryant	47.03
Nelson	Red Hills	47.04
North Westland
North Westland	Ngakawau	48.01
North Westland	Foulwind	48.02
North Westland	Buller	48.03
North Westland	Reefton	48.04
North Westland	Punakaiki	48.05
North Westland	Maimai	48.06
North Westland	Totara Flat	48.07
North Westland	Blackball	48.08
North Westland	Hochstetter	48.09
North Westland	Greymouth	48.10
North Westland	Brunner	48.11

Ecological region	Ecological district	Code
Spenser
Spenser	Rotoroa	49.01
Spenser	Travers	49.02
Spenser	Ella	49.03
Spenser	Lewis	49.04
Spenser	Hope	49.05
Whataroa
Whataroa	Hokitika	50.01
Whataroa	Whitcombe	50.02
Whataroa	Harihari	50.03
Whataroa	Wilberg	50.04
Whataroa	Waiho	50.05
Whataroa	Glaciers	50.06
Whataroa	Karangarua	50.07
Whataroa	Mahitahi	50.08
Aspiring
Aspiring	Paringa	51.01
Aspiring	Mataketake	51.02
Aspiring	Landsborough	51.03
Aspiring	Haast	51.04
Aspiring	Okuru	51.05
Aspiring	Arawata	51.06
Aspiring	Dart	51.07
Lowry
Lowry	Hundalee	52.01
Lowry	Leslie	52.02
Lowry	Culverden	52.03
Lowry	Waiau	52.04
Lowry	Cheviot	52.05
Lowry	Motunau	52.06
Lowry	Waikari	52.07
Hawdon
Hawdon	Minchin	53.01
Hawdon	Arthur's Pass	53.02
Puketeraki
Puketeraki	Sumner	54.01
Puketeraki	Poulter	54.02
Puketeraki	Cass	54.03
Puketeraki	Torlesse	54.04
Puketeraki	Craigieburn	54.05
Puketeraki	Coleridge	54.06
Canterbury Foothills
Canterbury Foothills	Ashley	55.01
Canterbury Foothills	Oxford	55.02
Canterbury Foothills	Whitecliffs	55.03
Canterbury Plains
Canterbury Plains	High Plains	56.01
Canterbury Plains	Low Plains	56.02
Canterbury Plains	Ellesmere	56.03
Banks
Banks	Port Hills	57.01
Banks	Herbert	57.02
Banks	Akaroa	57.03
D'archiac
D'archiac	Browning	58.01
D'archiac	Armoury	58.02
D'archiac	Mt Cook	58.03
Heron
Heron	Mathias	59.01
Heron	Mt Mutt	59.02
Heron	Arrowsmith	59.03
Heron	Hakatere	59.04
Heron	Two Thumb	59.05
Tasman
Tasman	Godley	60.01
Tasman	Dobson	60.02
Pareora
Pareora	Orari	61.01
Pareora	Fairlie	61.02
Pareora	Geraldine	61.03
Pareora	Hunters	61.04
Pareora	Waimate	61.05
Pareora	Hakataramea	61.06
Wainono
Wainono	Makikihi	62.01
Wainono	Glenavy	62.02
Wainono	Oamaru	62.03
Mackenzie
Mackenzie	Tekapo	63.01
Mackenzie	Pukaki	63.02
Mackenzie	Ben Ohau	63.03
Mackenzie	Grampians	63.04
Mackenzie	Ahuriri	63.05
Mackenzie	Omarama	63.06
Mackenzie	Benmore	63.07
Waitaki
Waitaki	Kirkliston	64.01
Waitaki	St Mary	64.02
Waitaki	Hawkdun	64.03
Waitaki	St Bathans	64.04
Kakanui
Kakanui	Duntroon	65.01
Kakanui	Dansey	65.02
Kakanui	Waianakarua	65.03
Lakes
Lakes	Huxley	66.01
Lakes	Wanaka	66.02
Lakes	Richardson	66.03
Lakes	Shotover	66.04
Lakes	Remarkables	66.05
Central Otago
Central Otago	Lindis	67.01
Central Otago	Pisa	67.02
Central Otago	Dunstan	67.03
Central Otago	Maniototo	67.04
Central Otago	Old Man	67.05
Central Otago	Manorburn	67.06
Central Otago	Rock and Pillar	67.07
Lammerlaw
Lammerlaw	Macraes	68.01
Lammerlaw	Waipori	68.02
Lammerlaw	Tapanui	68.03
Lammerlaw	Lawrence	68.04
Otago Coast
Otago Coast	Waikouaiti	69.01
Otago Coast	Dunedin	69.02
Otago Coast	Tokomairiro	69.03
Otago Coast	Balclutha	69.04
Catlins
Catlins	Waipahi	70.01
Catlins	Tahakopa	70.02
Olivine
Olivine	Cascade	71.01
Olivine	Pyke	71.02
Fiord
Fiord	Darran	72.01
Fiord	Doubtful	72.02
Fiord	Te Anau	72.03
Fiord	Preservation	72.04
Mavora
Mavora	Livingstone	73.01
Mavora	Eyre	73.02
Mavora	Upukerora	73.03
Waikaia
Waikaia	Nokomai	74.01
Waikaia	Umbrella	74.02
Gore	Gore	75.01
Southland Hills
Southland Hills	Takitimu	76.01
Southland Hills	Taringatura	76.02
Southland Hills	Hokonui	76.03
Te Wae Wae
Te Wae Wae	Waitutu	77.01
Te Wae Wae	Tuatapere	77.02
Te Wae Wae	Longwood	77.03
Makarewa
Makarewa	Southland Plains	78.01
Makarewa	Waituna	78.02
Rakiura
Rakiura	Foveaux	79.01
Rakiura	Anglem	79.02
Rakiura	Freshwater	79.03
Rakiura	Mt Allen	79.04
Rakiura	Solanders	79.05
Rakiura	Snares	79.06
Chathams	Chathams	80.01
Bounty	Bounty	81.01
Antipodes	Antipodes	82.01
Auckland Islands	Auckland Islands	83.01
Campbell	Campbell	84.01
Macquarie	Macquarie	85.01

== See also ==
- Environment of New Zealand
- Conservation in New Zealand
