= Protected Natural Area =

Protected Natural Area may refer to:

- Mexican Protected Natural Areas
- Areas that are part of the Protected Natural Areas Programme in New Zealand
- A type of conservation area in New Brunswick

See also

- Protected area
