= Tararua foordi =

Conservation status
- Data Deficit (NZ TCS)

Scientific classification
- Kingdom: Animalia
- Phylum: Arthropoda
- Subphylum: Chelicerata
- Class: Arachnida
- Order: Araneae
- Infraorder: Araneomorphae
- Family: Agelenidae
- Genus: Tararua
- Species: T. foordi

Binomial name
- Tararua foordi Forster & Wilton, 1973

Species of spider

Tararua foordi is a species of Agelenidae that is endemic to New Zealand.

== Taxonomy ==
This species was described in 1973 by Ray Forster and Cecil Wilton from female specimens. The holotype is stored in Otago Museum.

== Description ==
The female is recorded at 3.84mm in length. The carapace is coloured dark reddish brown with yellow brown areas. The legs are pale yellow with darker bands. The abdomen is grey with dark bands dorsally.

== Distribution ==
This species is only known from Rangipo Desert, New Zealand.

== Conservation status ==
Under the New Zealand Threat Classification System, this species is listed as "Data Deficient" with the qualifiers of "Data Poor: Size", "Data Poor: Trend" and "One Location".
