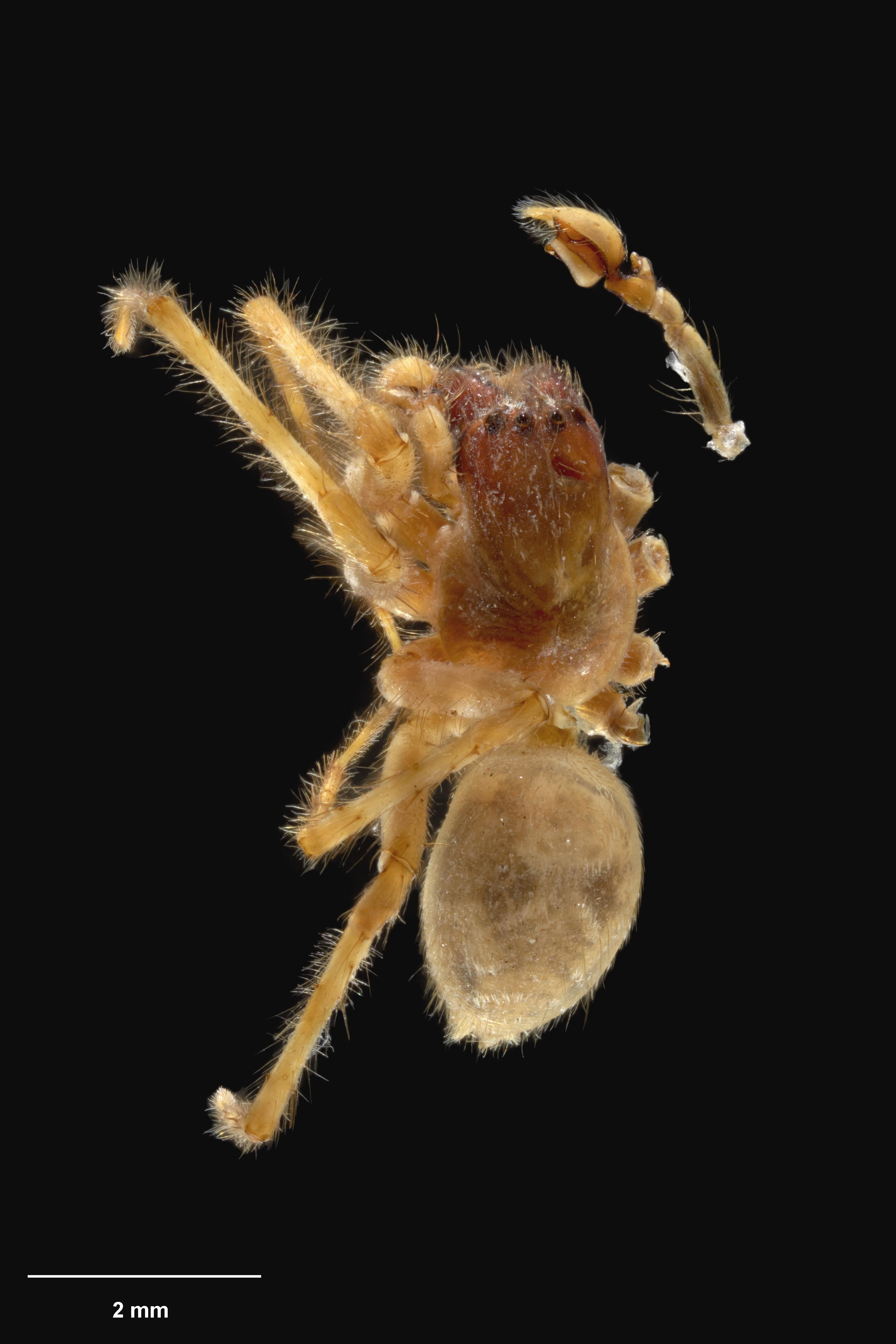

Conservation status
- Data Deficit (NZ TCS)

Scientific classification
- Kingdom: Animalia
- Phylum: Arthropoda
- Subphylum: Chelicerata
- Class: Arachnida
- Order: Araneae
- Infraorder: Araneomorphae
- Family: Agelenidae
- Genus: Tararua
- Species: T. diversa

Binomial name
- Tararua diversa Forster & Wilton, 1973

= Tararua diversa =

Species of spider

Tararua diversa is a species of Agelenidae that is endemic to New Zealand.

== Taxonomy ==
This species was described in 1973 by Ray Forster and Cecil Wilton from a male specimen. The holotype is stored in Te Papa Museum under registration number AS.000023.

== Description ==
The male is recorded at 5.2mm in length. The cephalothorax is reddish brown with pale areas. The legs are orange brown. The abdomen is yellow brown with dark shading laterally.

== Distribution ==
This species is only known from Nelson, New Zealand.

== Conservation status ==
Under the New Zealand Threat Classification System, this species is listed as "Data Deficient" with the qualifiers of "Data Poor: Size", "Data Poor: Trend" and "One Location".
