= Tararua celeripes =

Conservation status
- Data Deficient (NZ TCS)

Scientific classification
- Domain: Eukaryota
- Kingdom: Animalia
- Phylum: Arthropoda
- Subphylum: Chelicerata
- Class: Arachnida
- Order: Araneae
- Infraorder: Araneomorphae
- Family: Agelenidae
- Genus: Tararua
- Species: T. celeripes

Binomial name
- Tararua celeripes (Urquhart, 1891)

Synonyms
- Habronestes celeripes

Species of spider

Tararua celeripes is a species of Agelenidae that is endemic to New Zealand.

== Taxonomy ==
This species was described as Habronestes celeripes in 1891 by Arthur Urquhart from male and female specimens. It was most recently revised in 1973. The holotype is considered lost.

== Description ==
The female is recorded at 4.00mm in length whereas the male is 4.30mm.

== Distribution ==
This species is only known from Taranaki, New Zealand.

== Conservation status ==
Under the New Zealand Threat Classification System, this species is listed as "Data Deficient" with the qualifiers of "Data Poor: Size", "Data Poor: Trend" and "One Location".
