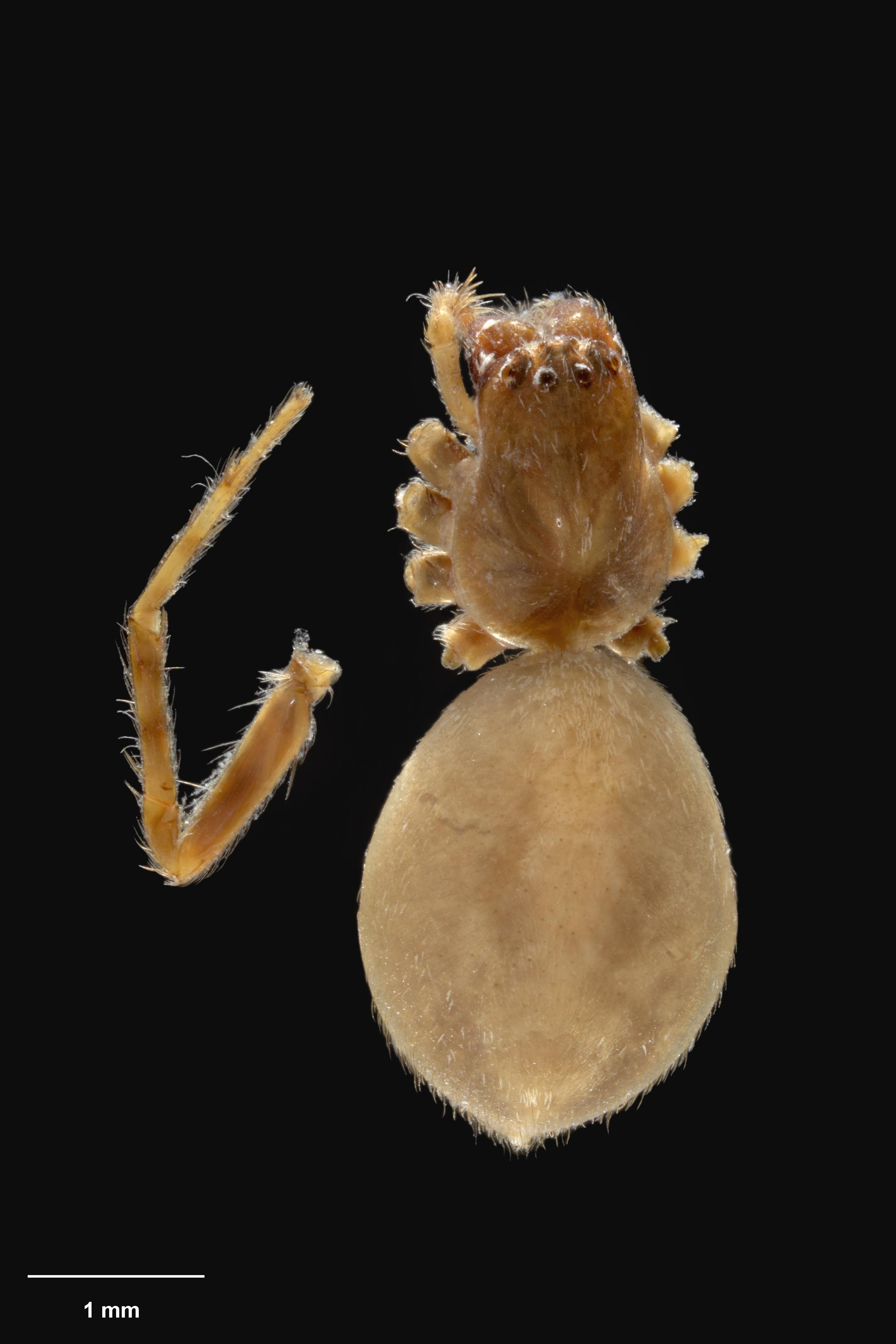

Conservation status
- Data Deficit (NZ TCS)

Scientific classification
- Kingdom: Animalia
- Phylum: Arthropoda
- Subphylum: Chelicerata
- Class: Arachnida
- Order: Araneae
- Infraorder: Araneomorphae
- Family: Agelenidae
- Genus: Tararua
- Species: T. puna

Binomial name
- Tararua puna Forster & Wilton, 1973

= Tararua puna =

Species of spider

Tararua puna is a species of Agelenidae that is endemic to New Zealand.

== Taxonomy ==
This species was described in 1973 by Ray Forster and Cecil Wilton from female and male specimens. The holotype is stored in Te Papa Museum under registration number AS.000092.

== Description ==
The female is recorded at 4.20mm in length whereas the male is 4.62mm. The cephalothorax and legs are reddish brown. The abdomen is reddish brown darker bands dorsally.

== Distribution ==
This species is only known from Waikaremoana, New Zealand.

== Conservation status ==
Under the New Zealand Threat Classification System, this species is listed as "Data Deficient" with the qualifiers of "Data Poor: Size" and "Data Poor: Trend".
