= Te Atairangikaahu =

Māori Queen from 1966 to 2006

Dame Te Atairangikaahu
- Te Arikinui
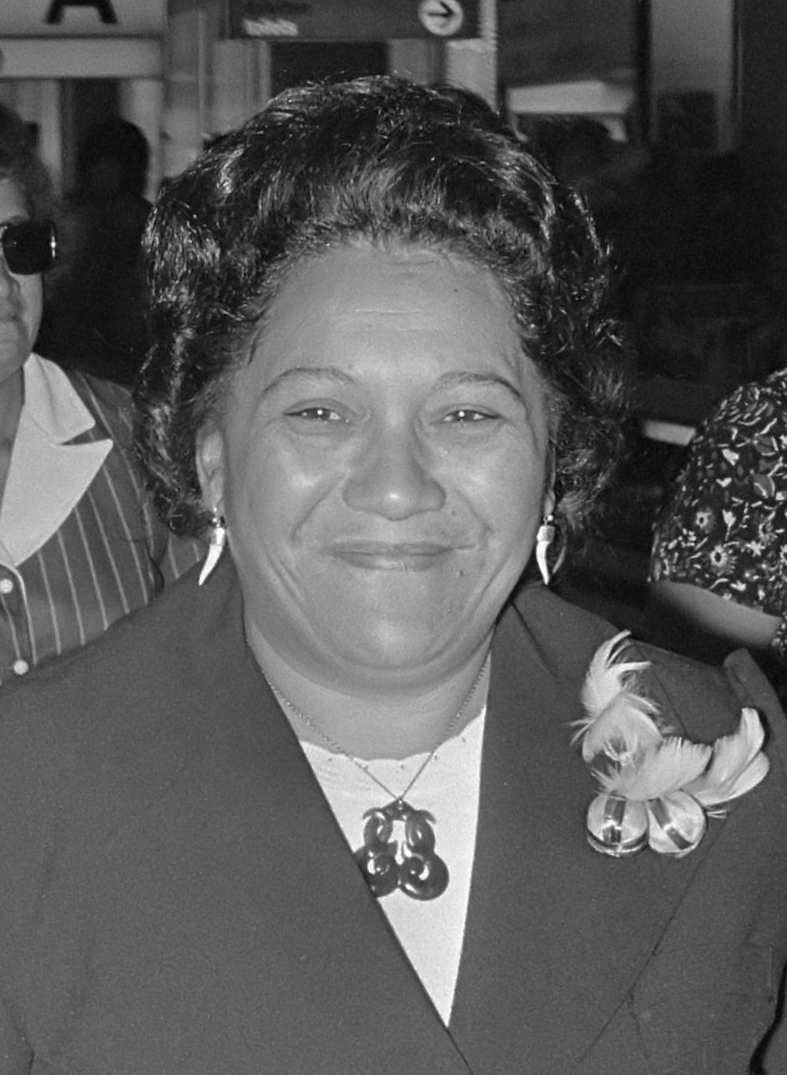
- Te Atairangikaahu in 1975

Māori Queen
- Reign: 23 May 1966 – 15 August 2006
- Coronation: 23 May 1966
- Predecessor: Korokī
- Successor: Tūheitia
- Born: Pikimene Korokī Mahuta; 23 July 1931; Waahi Marae, Huntly, New Zealand
- Died: 15 August 2006 (aged 75); Turangawaewae Marae, Ngāruawāhia, New Zealand
- Burial: 21 August 2006; Mount Taupiri, New Zealand
- Spouse: Whatumoana Paki (m. 1952)
- Issue: Heeni Katipa (née Paki); Tomairangi Paki; Tūheitia; Kiki Solomon (née Paki); Mihi Gabrielle Paki; Maharaia Paki; Te Manawanui Clarkson (née Paki)
Names
- Te Arikinui Dame Te Atairangikaahu
- House: Te Wherowhero
- Father: Korokī Mahuta
- Mother: Te Atairangikaahu Herangi

Dame Te Atairangikaahu ONZ DBE OStJ (born Pikimene Korokī Mahuta, 23 July 1931 – 15 August 2006) reigned as Māori Queen from 1966 until her death in 2006. Her reign was the longest of any Māori monarch.

Her full name and title was Te Arikinui Dame Te Atairangikaahu. Her title Te Arikinui (meaning Paramount Chief) and name Te Atairangikaahu (meaning the hawk of the morning sky) were bestowed when she became monarch. Her full whakapapa (lineage) name, linking her to previous Māori monarchs, was Te Atairangikaahu Korokī Te Rata Mahuta Tāwhiao Pōtatau Te Wherowhero.

== Life ==
She was born to the name Pikimene Korokī Mahuta within the marriage of Korokī Mahuta and Te Atairangikaahu Hērangi; Korokī Mahuta fathered older daughters, Tuura the younger of two, both by Tepaia, an earlier relationship. Known as Piki during her early life, she had whāngai-adopted siblings including Sir Robert Mahuta, whose daughter Nanaia Mahuta served as a member of Parliament and, from 2020 to 2023, foreign minister. Te Atairangikaahu was a descendant of the first Māori king, Pōtatau Te Wherowhero. She attended Rakaumanga Primary School and Waikato Diocesan School for Girls.

In 1952, she married Whatumoana Paki, whose father was from Waikato tribe Ngāti Whāwhākia and mother from the northern tribe of Te Aupōuri. They had seven children: Tūheitia Paki, Heeni Katipa (née Paki), Tomairangi Paki, Kiki Solomon (née Paki), Mihi Gabrielle Paki, Maharaia Paki, and Te Manawanui Clarkson (née Paki).

== Reign ==
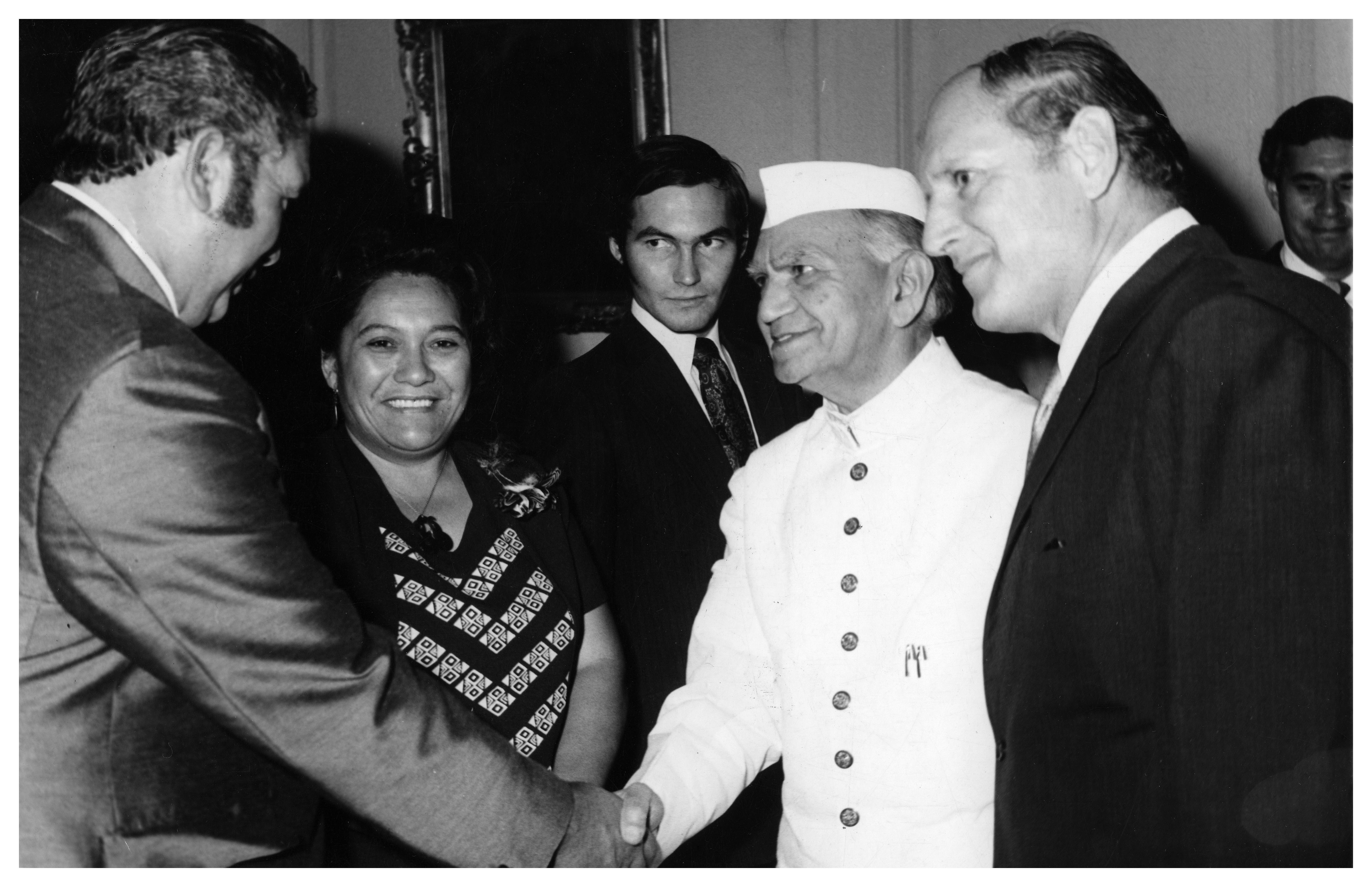
Te Atairangikaahu meeting President Fakhruddin Ali Ahmed of India in New Delhi, 1975

Korokī died on 18 May 1966. Leaders from the Kīngitanga subsequently elected Princess Piki to succeed her father during the six-day tangihanga (funeral rites); after an initial reluctance to accept the title, she formally became queen on 23 May, the day Korokī was buried. To mark the accession, she adopted the name of her mother, Te Atairangikaahu, who died the previous year.

Although the office of the Māori monarch holds no constitutional function, it is the paramount head of the Waikato federation of tribes with its parliament. Te Atairangikaahu was also an avid supporter of Māori cultural and sporting events and played an active role in local and global political events involving indigenous issues.

Her official residence was Turongo House in the Tūrangawaewae Marae complex coupled with Mahinarangi (official reception room for receiving dignitaries) and Raukawa iti (official guest house). She and her husband also resided at Waahi Pa in Huntly during her reign. He continued to live at their residence with his son until his death in 2011.

== Illness and death ==
In December 2005, Te Atairangikaahu started dialysis treatment when her kidneys began to fail. On 11 July 2006, she suffered what appeared to be a heart attack, and was admitted to intensive care in Waikato Hospital, Hamilton. She was discharged from hospital later in the month, in time to celebrate her 75th birthday.

Te Arikinui Dame Te Atairangikaahu died on 15 August 2006 at her official residence, Tūrangawaewae marae in Ngāruawāhia. Six of her seven children were present, with one daughter en route from Australia.

Her death sparked a week of mourning for Māoridom leading to her funeral on 21 August 2006. She is buried on Taupiri mountain in an unmarked grave, as are her ancestors, as a sign of equality with their people. Queen Elizabeth II sent her condolences.

Her widower, Whatumoana Paki, wanted a tombstone for his wife, but members of the royal family do not have grave markings. Instead, Paki paid tribute to his wife by planting a breed of purple roses, named specifically for Te Atairangikaahu, around a memorial stone outside their home.

== Succession ==
Tūheitia Paki, her eldest son, was chosen during the mourning period as her successor with the help of a "kingmaker", after the consent of the chiefs of all the leading tribes was sought. Her eldest child, daughter Heeni Katipa, was the next leading contender for the position.

In contrast to the monarchy of New Zealand, the Māori monarchy is both elective and operates outside New Zealand's constitutional structures. Consequently, the position is not automatically inherited by primogeniture as the New Zealand throne is. Te Atairangikaahu herself was her father's second daughter, though the eldest was not born to his wife, so any of her children or a leading figure from another iwi could have been appointed as her successor.

== Honours ==
In the 1970 New Year Honours, Te Atairangikaahu was the first Māori to be appointed a Dame Commander of the Order of the British Empire, "for outstanding services to the Māori people".

On 6 February 1987, Te Atairangikaahu was the first appointee to the Order of New Zealand and her badge of the order bears the number 1.

She was awarded an honorary doctorate from Waikato University in 1973, and an Honorary Doctor of Laws from Victoria University in 1999. In 1986, she was appointed an Officer of the Order of St John.

She was awarded the New Zealand 1990 Commemoration Medal, and in 1993, she was awarded the New Zealand Suffrage Centennial Medal.

Posthumously, Tuheitia, her son and successor as Māori King, honoured her as the namesake of the Illustrious Order of Te Arikinui Queen Te Atairangikaahu when he established the Māori Kīngi Honours in 2014.

Country	Date	Appointment	Ribbon	Post-nominal letters	Notes
New Zealand	1 January 1970	Dame Commander of the Order of the British Empire		DBE	
New Zealand	1986	Officer of the Order of St John		OStJ	
New Zealand	6 February 1987	Order of New Zealand		ONZ	
New Zealand	1990	New Zealand 1990 Commemoration Medal			
New Zealand	1993	New Zealand Suffrage Centennial Medal			

Regnal titles
Preceded by Korokī Mahuta	Queen of the Kīngitanga; 1966–2006	Succeeded by Tuheitia Paki
