= Hapuakohe Range =

Mountain range in New Zealand

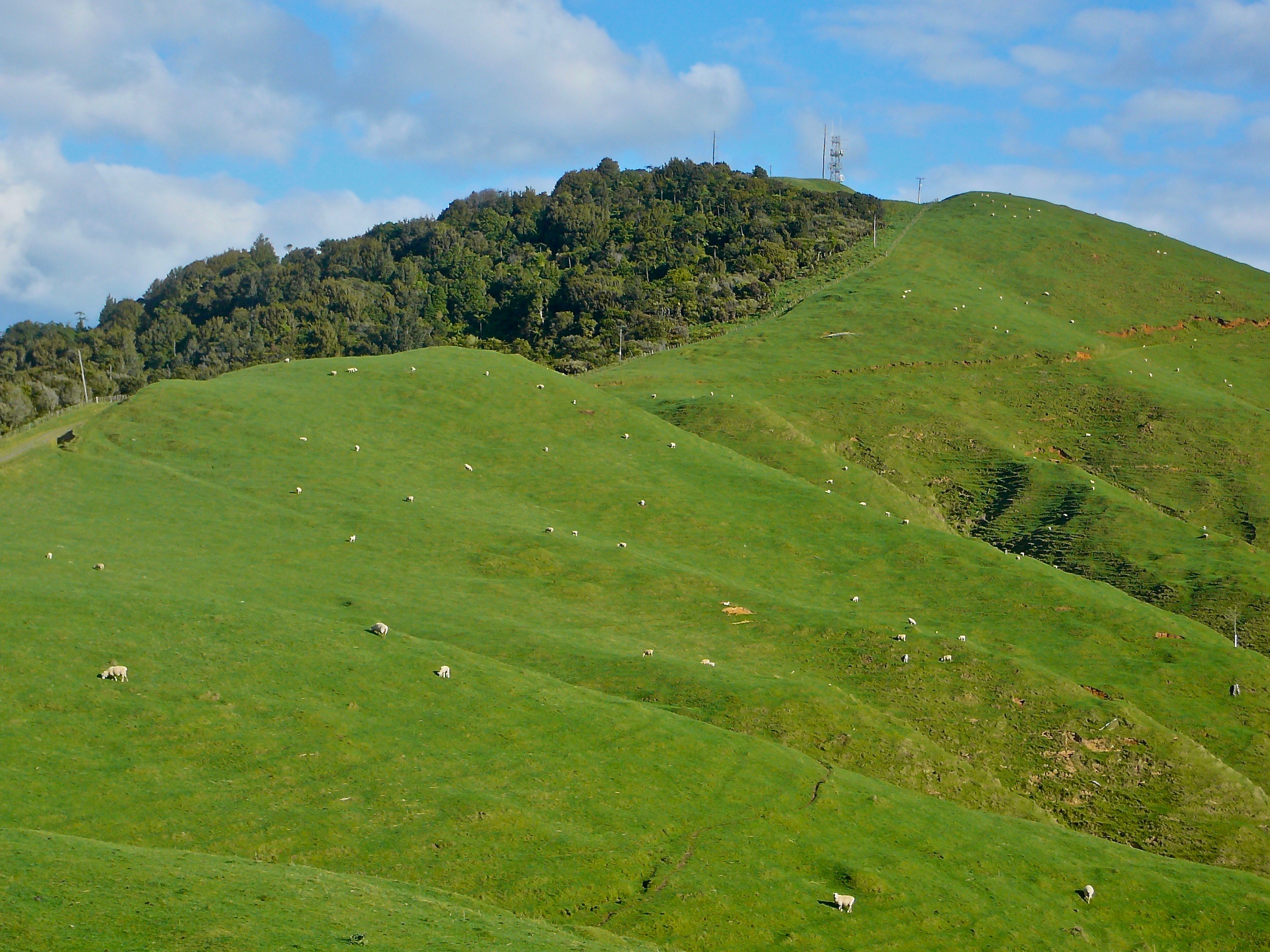
- Maungakawa summit from north

Highest point
- Elevation: 535 m (1,755 ft)
- Coordinates: 37.41403°S 175.39641°E

Geography
- Location within New Zealand
- Location: Waikato, New Zealand

Geology
- Rock age: Jurassic
- Rock type: Greywacke

Hapuakohe Range of hills is aligned north–south, between the Waikato River and the Hauraki Plains in the Waikato region of New Zealand. It is separated from the Taupiri Range by an air-gap at Mangawara, where the Waikato flowed about 20,000 years ago.

The range is drained by the Waitakaruru and Whangamarino Rivers and their tributaries at the north end. Further south, tributaries of the Piako River drain the east side of the range and streams flow to the Waikato on the west.

The 1865 confiscation boundary ran along the range. The boundary between Waikato and Ohinemuri (from 1920 Hauraki Plains) counties followed a similar line, as does the current boundary between Waikato, Hauraki and Matamata Piako Districts.

== Named summits and road ==
From north to south, the features named on the LINZ map are:

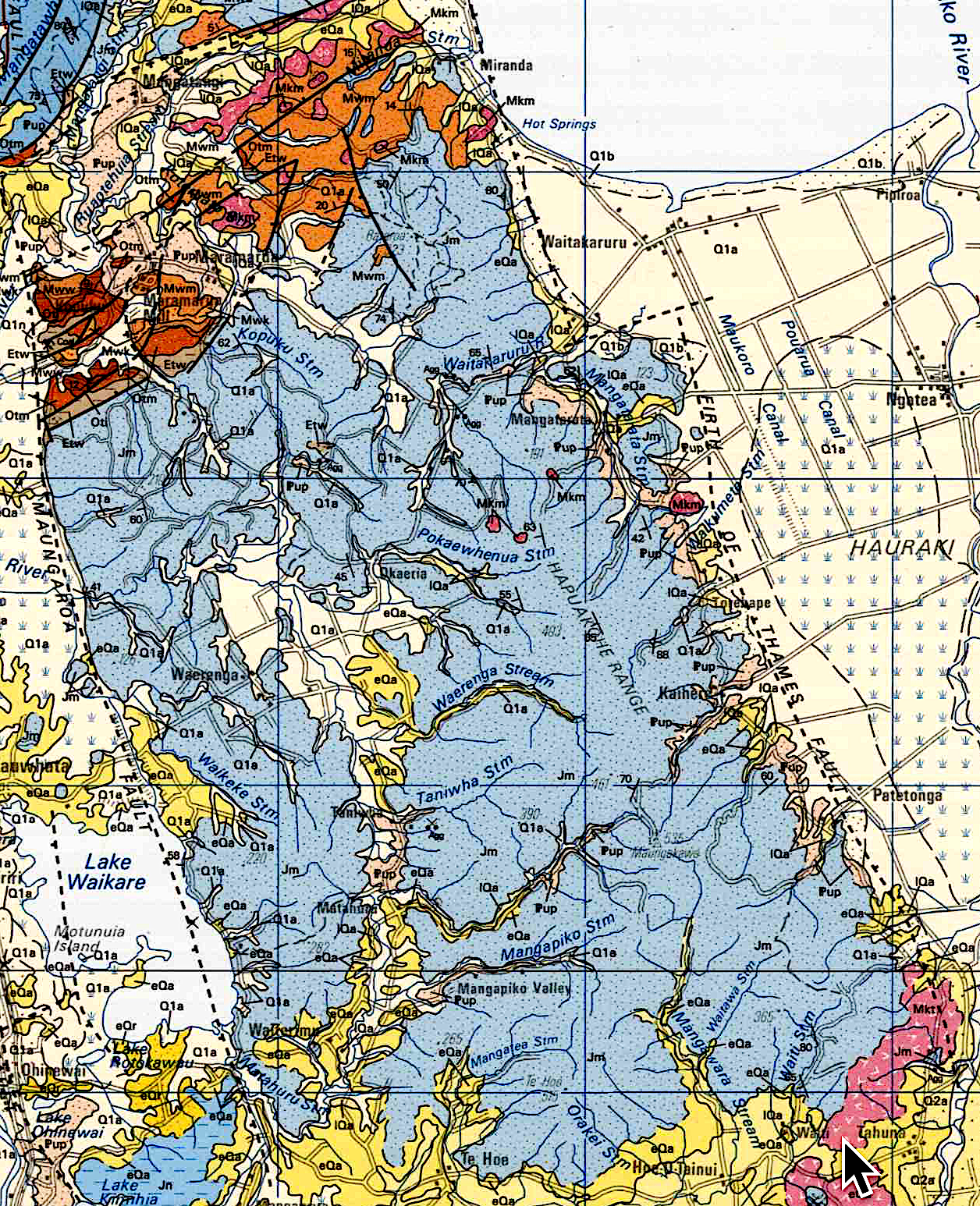
Hapuakohe Range on 1 to 250,000 geology map

- Pukekamaka 275 m (902 ft)
- Okaeria 321 m (1,053 ft)
- Karamuroa 440 m (1,440 ft)
- Otane 432 m (1,417 ft)
- Ikeike 452 m (1,483 ft) - west of main ridge – a low priority walkway plan may link them.
- Matahuru Rd 300 m (980 ft) - in 2007 the lower part of the road averaged 61 vehicles a day. Beyond there, the road is gravel for over 8 km (5.0 mi), towards the junction of Ohinewai Rd and SH27, near Kaihere.
- Maungakawa 535 m (1,755 ft) - Chorus Ltd's microwave tower on the summit is about 28 m (92 ft) high. There is also a 495 m (1,624 ft) Maungakawa hill near Cambridge.
- Pukeitionga 510 m (1,670 ft)
- Tirotiro 279 m (915 ft) (east of main ridge)
- Maukoro 92 m (302 ft) (east of main ridge)
- Pororua 267 m (876 ft) (west of main ridge)
- Hapuakohe 515 m (1,690 ft)
- Ngaraparapa 521 m (1,709 ft)
- Te Hoe 516 m (1,693 ft) – Te Hoe pā, with terraces, scarps and pits, was used by Ngāti Wairere and Ngāti Hauā.
- Tauwhare 481 m (1,578 ft)
- Te Heru 200 m (660 ft)
- Puketutu Pā 220 m (720 ft)
- Ruakiwi Pā 240 m (790 ft)

== Geology ==
As shown on this GNS map, the Hapuakohe Range is mainly formed of greywacke of the Jurassic Manaia Hill Group (shown as Jm on map). Overlain with volcanic ash, they've mainly formed clay podzol soils, with poor drainage, which are prone to sheet erosion, particularly on grazed, steep land.

Cenozoic intrusive rocks surface at either end of the range; Tahuna unit (Mkt) at the south end is 6–7 Ma basaltic andesite and pyroxene andesite, with eroded remnants of lava flows and volcanic breccias. Miranda Unit (Mkm), at the north end, is 13–10 Ma, also of basaltic and pyroxene andesite, but including dacite, tuff and hornblende.

== Hapuakohe Walkway ==
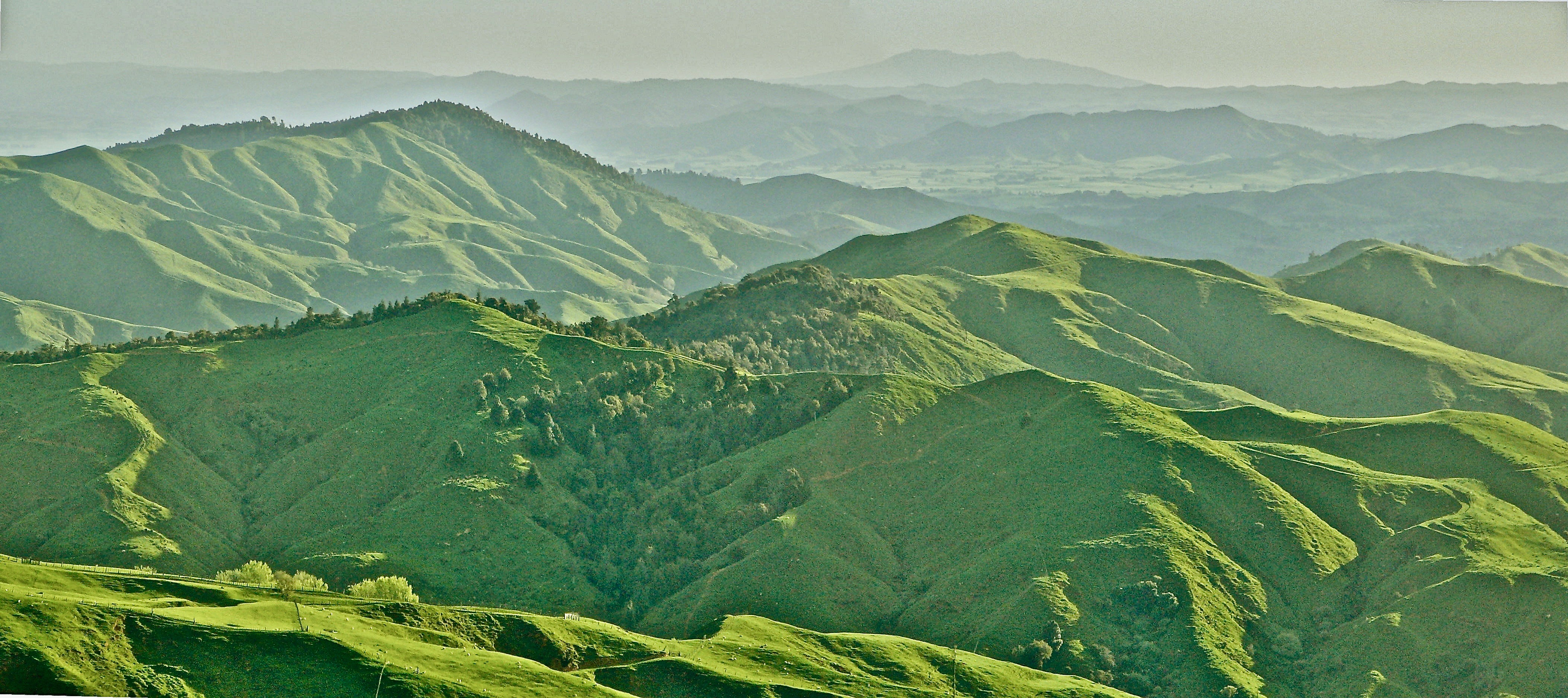
Mt Karioi, on the south western horizon, from Maungakawa

There is a 24.8 km (15.4 mi) Department of Conservation walkway along the range, allowing excellent views of Mt Te Aroha, Firth of Thames, Huntly power station, hill country south of Auckland and the Waikato Plains.

== Ecology ==
The Hapuakohe Range includes Hapuakohe Conservation and Ecological (970 ha (2,400 acres)) areas, Mangapiko Valley (321 ha (790 acres)) and Matahuru (1,336 ha (3,300 acres)) scenic reserves, the southern 1,140 acres (460 ha) being protected since 1906 under the 1903 Scenery Preservation Act. A warm, humid climate influences growth, with rainfall of 120 cm (47 in) to 160 cm (63 in) a year.

The natural vegetation was kauri forest, often mixed with podocarps, and, at the southern end, with hard beech, with rimu–tawa forest at higher levels and kahikatea on the flood plains. Tanekaha, rewarewa, mingimingi, prickly mingimingi, silver fern, wheki, kanuka and pūriri are also common and there is some taraire. All the large kauri trees have been logged, but now about 42% of the native vegetation is protected from clearance, some 58% of the rest being kanuka and manuka scrubland, mainly on the eastern foothills.

No detailed survey of native animals seems to have been done. Kererū and copper skinks are present. Longtailed bats, NZ falcon, Hochstetter's and Archey's frogs, forest gecko and green geckos are likely to be in the Range. Until the 1980s kokako were in the area, but thought to be locally extinct now, though numbers have recovered in the Hunua Ranges to the north.
