= Protected Natural Areas Programme =

The Protected Natural Areas Programme (PNAP) of New Zealand began in 1981 as a means of evaluating areas worthy of protection. As part of the programme a series of ecological districts have been created and 83 of the approximately 270 had been surveyed by 2001.

The Reserves Act 1977 was the legislative basis for the programme.

== See also ==
- Conservation in New Zealand
