= Tararua (spider) =

Scientific classification
- Kingdom: Animalia
- Phylum: Arthropoda
- Subphylum: Chelicerata
- Class: Arachnida
- Order: Araneae
- Infraorder: Araneomorphae
- Family: Agelenidae
- Genus: Tararua; Forster & Wilton, 1973

Type species
- T. celeripes (Urquhart, 1891)

Species
- 7, see text

Genus of spiders

Tararua is a genus of South Pacific funnel weavers first described by Raymond Robert Forster & C. L. Wilton in 1973.

== Species ==
As of October 2026 it contains seven species:

- Tararua celeripes (Urquhart, 1891) — New Zealand
- Tararua clara Forster & Wilton, 1973 — New Zealand
- Tararua diversa Forster & Wilton, 1973 — New Zealand
- Tararua foordi Forster & Wilton, 1973 — New Zealand
- Tararua puna Forster & Wilton, 1973 — New Zealand
- Tararua ratuma Forster & Wilton, 1973 — New Zealand
- Tararua versuta Forster & Wilton, 1973 — New Zealand
