= Whatumoana Paki =

New Zealand Māori royal elder

Whatumoana Paki QSO (1 February 1926 – 22 September 2011) was a New Zealand Māori royal elder. Paki was the husband of the Māori Queen, Te Atairangikaahu, who reigned from 1966 to 2006. He and Te Atairangikaahu were the parents of the seventh Māori monarch, Tūheitia Paki.

== Biography ==
Paki was born in Huntly. His father was Wetere Paki of the Ngāti Whawhakia subtribe of the Waikato tribe. His mother Frances Paki (née Brown) was from Te Aupōuri, the northernmost Māori iwi, or tribal group, in New Zealand. Paki worked as a farmer and coalminer during his early career. He became one of the principal maintenance people for Māori marae located along the Waikato River, which includes the Mangatautari marae.

By the 1950s, Paki began dating Princess Piki Mahuta, the only daughter of both King Korokī and his wife Te Atairangikaahu Hērangi. The couple married in 1952. They had seven children - Heeni Wharemaru, Kiri Tokia Ete Tomairangi, Tuheitia, Maharaia, Mihikiteao, Kiki and Te Manawanui. They lived at Waahi Pā in Huntly, in a home Paki helped to build.

King Korokī died in 1966. Paki's wife succeeded her father as Māori Queen and became known as Te Arikinui Te Atairangikaahu. As the consort of the Queen, Paki had to step back from public statements and defer public opinions to her. Dame Iritana Tāwhiwhirangi, a longtime friend of Paki, recalled that Paki told her of his expected role within the monarchy, "He shared with me that a kaumatua told him, 'Just remember that you must leave all the statements to her.' For a man who had a very strong mind that can't have been easy. Gosh, I know some men who wouldn't have done that for anything. But he did it with panache and he was a tower of strength behind Dame Te Ata."

In 1990, Paki received the New Zealand 1990 Commemoration Medal, and in the 1991 New Year Honours he was appointed a Companion of the Queen's Service Order for community service.

Dame Te Atairangikaahu died in 2006 after 54 years of marriage. Paki's son Tuheitia Paki, succeeded his mother as Māori king. Paki had wanted a tombstone for his wife, but members of the royal family of Tainui, called kāhui ariki, are not permitted to have monuments at their graves. Instead, Paki planted a breed of purple roses, named specifically for Te Atairangikaahu, around a memorial stone at their home in Waahi Pā.

Paki continued to live at his home at Waahi Pā following Te Atairangikaahu's death. He was ill and hospitalized for much of 2011. However, Paki checked himself out of the hospital in August 2011 to attend his son's fifth coronation (Koroneihana) anniversary celebrations, and pōwhiri.

Paki died on 22 September 2011, at the age of 85 after a long illness. His funeral was held at his home at Waahi Pā, Huntly, with dignitaries attending from as far away as the Cook Islands, Hawaii, and Samoa. He was buried on Mount Taupiri next to his wife. He was driven to Mount Taupiri in a 1930 Model A Ford, which he had helped restore.
