= Tararu =

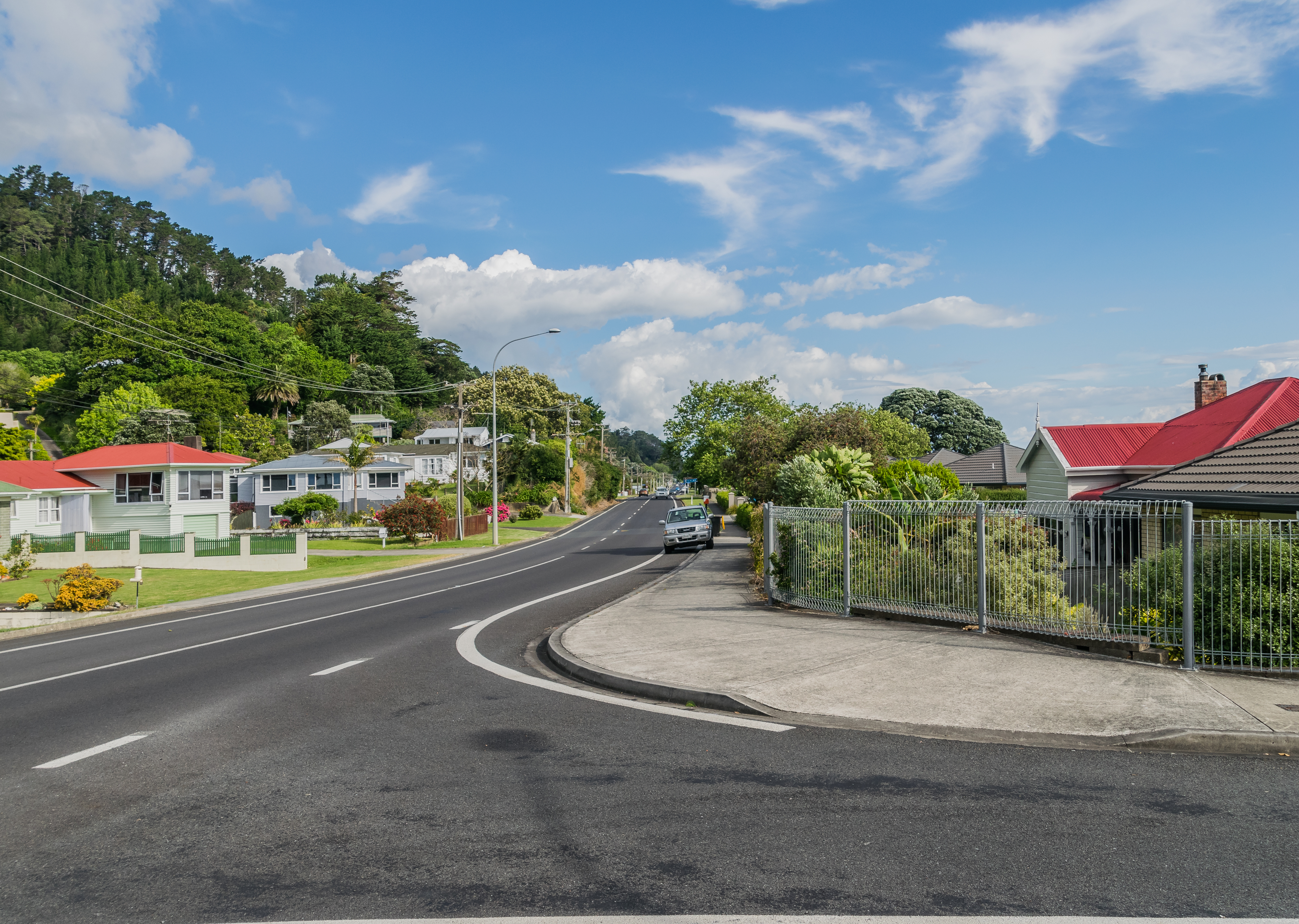
- Tararu Road in 2019

- Location within New Zealand
- Coordinates: 37.11241°S 175.51907°E
- Country: New Zealand
- Region: Waikato
- District: Thames-Coromandel District

Population (2013)
  - Total: 525

Tararu is a former gold-mining village on the west coast of the Coromandel Peninsula of New Zealand. State Highway 25 runs through it; Te Puru being about 7 km (4.3 mi) to the north, and Thames about 2 km (1.2 mi) to the south.

Tararu has a boat ramp, a 91-dwelling retirement village, a store, 2 motels, a holiday park and is the northern terminus of the Thames Connector bus. The Category 1 former Thames North School opened on 25 January 1878, closed in 1971 and was taken over by Thames Coromandel Council in 1978. It is now Thames Art Gallery.

In the 2013 census, Tararu's population was 525, made up of 210 in meshblock 1048800, 138 (1048900), 48 (1048700), 39 (1049000) and 90 (1049100).

Tararu is connected to the Thames water supply.

== Tararu Stream ==
The Tararu Stream drains a steep hilly catchment of 15.5 km^{2} (6.0 sq mi) in the Coromandel Range with regenerating native vegetation and scrub. Most of the village lies on the stream's alluvial fan on the Firth of Thames coast. Tararu suffered severe flooding during the 'weather bomb 2002'. A flood mitigation scheme has since been created, including lengthening of the SH25 bridge in 2008. The 10 km (6.2 mi) Tararu Track climbs up the valley to meet with other walking tracks at Crosbies Hut.

== History ==
Te Anaputa, just north of Tararu, may have been the place where the Tainui waka first landed. Ngāti Maru owned Tararu until it was sold, amid some controversy, in 1867, after gold had been discovered.

The township was laid out in 1868, when it was renamed London, though the name didn't catch on. In 1869 the track from Thames was improved and a bridleway created to Tapu. From 1871 to 1874 a tramway linked Thames to Tararu and, from 1872, to the wharf, built into deeper water at Tararu Point (Wilson Street) by Robert Graham. A track to Coromandel was started in 1871. A racecourse was built and pleasure gardens were created in what is now Dickson Holiday Park.

From 1874 a decline started, after the wharf and tramway were badly damaged in a severe gale. Much of the ore was hard to process, and poor transport had initially held back development. Tararu transitioned to a residential area for Thames.

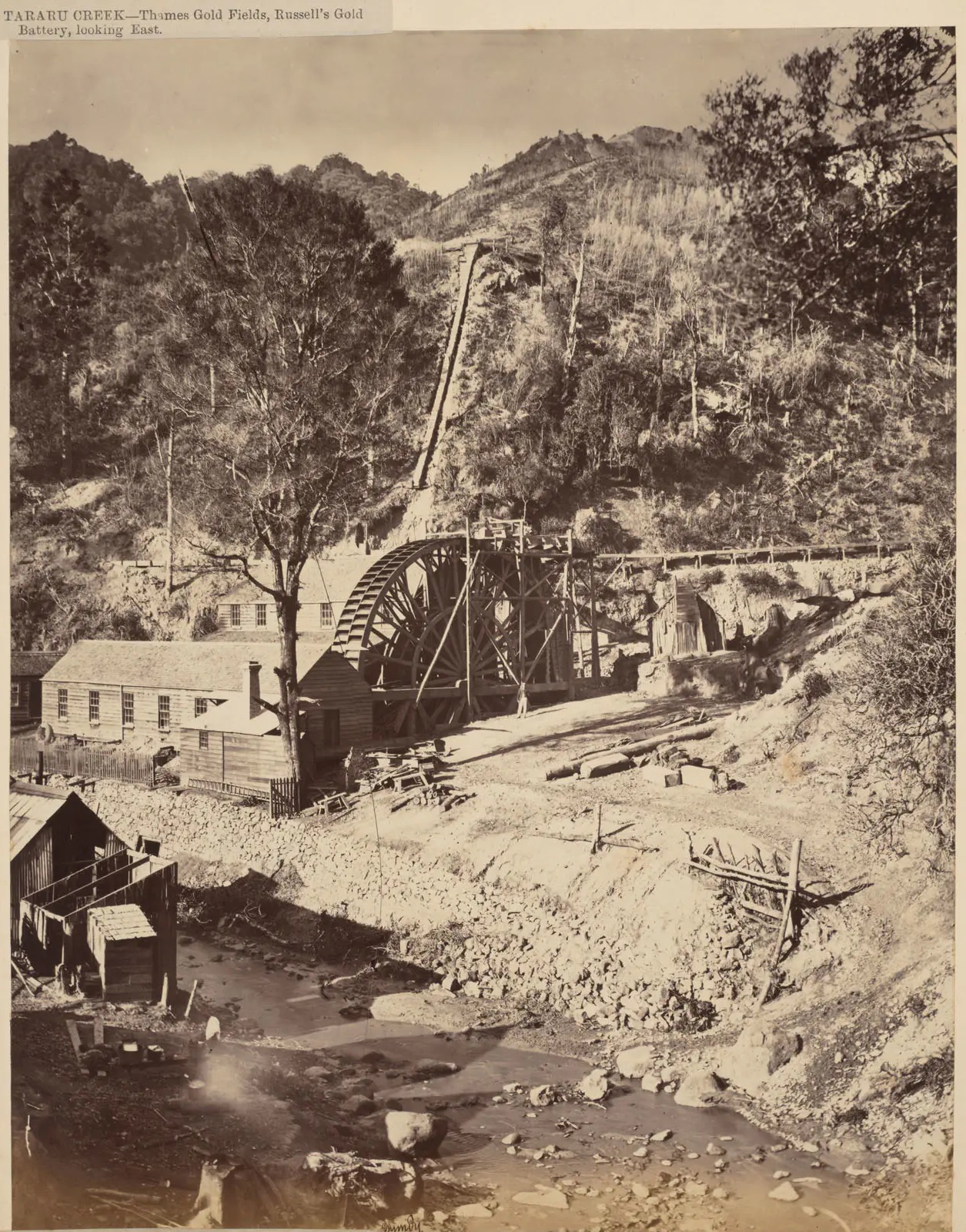
P. N. Russell & Co Gold Battery in 1869, at the junction of Tararu Creek and Tinker's Gully

=== Gold ===
The Tararu valley was part of the Coromandel goldfield and had 5 batteries, with 141 stampers in about 1870, from Brown Campbell & Co at the mouth of the stream, to Tower of London Gold Mining Co at the top.

Several claims were being explored in Tinkers Gully in 1868. The remnants of the workings can be seen from a walkway through the gully. In 1872 Tinkers Gully was described as a source of kauri timber and the tramway was being extended to it.
