= Mount Taupiri =

Hill in Waikato, New Zealand

Coordinates: 37.6048°S 175.1862°E

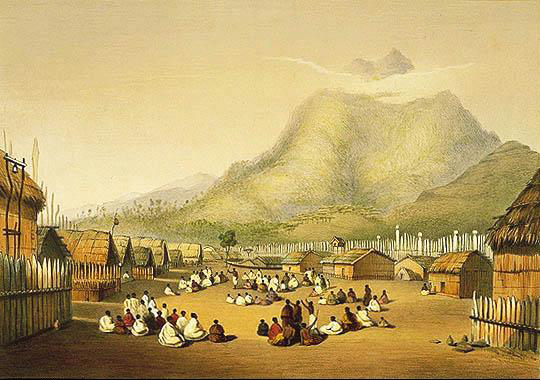
Kaitotehe, the pā of Pōtatau Te Wherowhero, with Mount Taupiri in the background (Angas 1846)

Mount Taupiri is a hill at the southern end of the Taupiri Range in the Waikato. The highest peak in the range, it rises to 288 metres above sea level and overlooks Taupiri township immediately to its south. It is separated from the Hakarimata Range to the south by the Taupiri Gorge, through which the Waikato River flows from the Waikato Basin to the Lower Waikato. The Mangawara Stream joins the Waikato River at the base of the hill.

Mount Taupiri is a sacred mountain and burial ground for the Waikato tribe of the Māori people. Until sometime in the 19th century a large Māori village or town, Kaitotehe, stood on the flat land on the other side of the river, below the Hakarimata Range. In early years it was the home of Pāoa, brother of Mahuta, before Pāoa moved to Hauraki. It became the headquarters of the Ngāti Mahuta people. Brothers Whare and Tapuae, grandsons of Mahuta and the leaders of Ngāti Mahuta, lived there. After the two brothers were killed, Tapuae's son Te Putu built Taupiri pā on the summit of a spur of Taupiri mountain, in the 1600s. When Te Putu was an old man in the 1700s, he was treacherously killed by Ngātokowaru of Ngāti Raukawa at Te Mata-o-tutonga, his home outside the pā by the banks of the Waikato River. He was buried at the pā, which thus became tapu (sacred) and was abandoned. Early European travellers in the area were obliged by Māori to cross to the other side of the Waikato River to avoid the sacred area.

In the early 19th century Kaitotehe was the home of Pōtatau Te Wherowhero, the paramount chief of Ngāti Mahuta who became the first Māori King. English explorer and artist George French Angas visited Kaitotehe in 1844 and painted a scene depicting a hui (meeting) taking place in the village. Taupiri mountain is seen in the background on the other side of the Waikato River (which is not visible below the far palisade). The lower peak on the far right shows signs of the terraces of Te Putu's abandoned pā. To its left, in about the middle of the painting, is a still-lower bush-clad hill, which was the burial ground in Te Putu's time and below which his home of Te Mata-o-tutonga stood.

The present-day burial ground is directly above State Highway 1 and the North Island Main Trunk railway line on a steep slope. Parking and access is difficult, because the road and railway lie largely on land at the foot of the slope that has been reclaimed from the river. Access is being improved by a bridge from the township over the Mangawara Stream, open in May 2020. The deceased Māori kings and queen are buried in the highest part of the cemetery, on the summit where Te Putu's pā stood.

== Notable people buried there ==
- Tūheitia (1955–2024), Māori King
- Te Arikinui Dame Te Atairangikaahu (1931–2006), Māori Queen
- Korokī Mahuta (1906–1966), Māori King
- Tāwhiao (1822–1894), Māori King
- Pōtatau Te Wherowhero (c. 1770 – 1860), First Māori King (start of the Kingitanga or Māori King Movement)
- Whatumoana Paki (died 2011), husband of Te Atairangikaahu
- Billy T. James (1948–1991), comedian
