= Piupiu Te Wherowhero =

New Zealand Māori leader (died 1937)

Piupiu Te Wherowhero (c. 1886/1887 – 29 October 1937) was a female leader within the Māori royal family in early 20th century New Zealand.

She was born at Whatiwhatihoe, Waikato, probably in 1886 or 1887. Her father was Te Wherowhero Tāwhiao, the second son of King Tāwhiao and brother of King Mahuta, and a member of the Ngāti Mahuta tribe. Her mother was Tamirangi Manahi of Ngāti Tamaoho of Te Kuiti. She first married Kainuku Vaikai, of Rarotongan descent. Her second marriage was to Hiroka Hetet (also known as Hikaka Hetet) after which she was often known as Piupiu Hetet.

Te Wherowhero died on 29 October 1937 at Arapuni and was buried on Taupiri mountain. She was survived by ten children. A daughter, Te Amohia Ormsby, was the birth mother of Robert Mahuta, who was adopted by King Korokī.
