= Korokī =

Māori King from 1933 to 1966

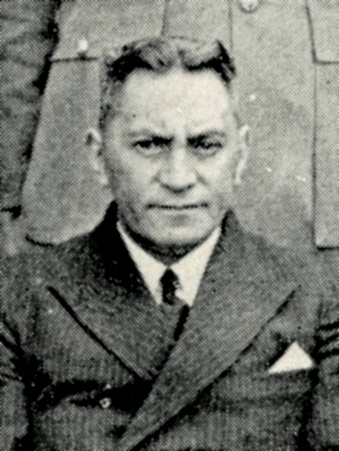
- Korokī in 1944

Māori King
- Reign: 8 October 1933 – 18 May 1966
- Coronation: 8 October 1933
- Predecessor: Te Rata
- Successor: Te Atairangikaahu
- Born: Korokī Te Rata Mahuta Tāwhiao Pōtatau Te Wherowhero; 16 June 1906; Waahi, Huntly
- Died: 18 May 1966 (aged 59)
- Burial: 23 May 1966; Mount Taupiri, New Zealand
- Spouse: Te Atairangikaahu Hērangi
- Issue: Te Atairangikaahu
- Father: Te Rata
- Mother: Te Uranga

Korokī Te Rata Mahuta Tāwhiao Pōtatau Te Wherowhero (16 June 1906 – 18 May 1966) was the fifth Māori king. He was the elder son of the fourth Māori king, Te Rata Mahuta, and Te Uranga of the Ngāti Korokī tribe.

== Biography ==
Korokī Mahuta was born at Waahi, Huntly, on 16 June 1906. He was named Korokī after the ancestor of his mother's tribe. He had at least two brothers and two sisters. Korokī's younger brother Taipū died in 1924, shortly after arriving at Wesley College.

Korokī had a relationship with Te Paea Raihe, probably in the 1920s, and they had two daughters. In about 1930 Princess Te Puea Hērangi arranged for him to marry her niece Te Atairangikaahu, the daughter of her brother Wanakore Herangi. Te Atairangikaahu had a daughter, Piki, born in 1931. They adopted a son, Robert Mahuta, in 1939. Korokī and his family lived at Waahi.

Korokī's father died on 1 October 1933, when Korokī was 24. He was chosen to succeed his father as king and accepted reluctantly. He was crowned on 8 October 1933, the day of his father's funeral.

In his first few years as king, he was closely supervised by his father's brothers Tumate and Tonga Mahuta, and Haunui Tawhiao, brother of his grandfather King Mahuta. Two of his main confidants and supporters were Pei Te Hurinui Jones and Piri Poutapu. In 1953, he was awarded the Queen Elizabeth II Coronation Medal. On 30 December 1953 he received Queen Elizabeth II when she called at his official residence at Tūrangawaewae marae at Ngāruawāhia during the coronation tour.

He died at Ngāruawāhia on 18 May 1966 and was buried on Mount Taupiri on 23 May 1966. He was succeeded by his daughter Piki, who was given her mother's name of Te Atairangikaahu at her coronation.

Māori royalty
Preceded by Te Rata	Māori King; 1933–1966	Succeeded by Te Atairangikaahu
