= Flags of the Kīngitanga =

List of flags used in Kīngitanga throughout history

The Kīngitanga, also known as the Māori King Movement, is an indigenous New Zealand elected monarchy established by the Tainui and other iwi in 1858 in an attempt to unify Māori tribes against encroachment on their territory by British settlers.

It has used many flags since its founding, including some similar to British naval ensigns.

Flag	Date	Use	Description
	1858	Flag of the United Tribes of New Zealand	The amended flag of the United Tribes of New Zealand, New Zealand's first flag, gazetted in 1835 and based on the design selected in 1834. It was said to have been flown at the coronation of Pōtatau Te Wherowhero in 1858. Te Wherowhero and other North Island chiefs had been signatories to the Declaration of Independence of New Zealand in the late 1830s.
	1858–?	Potatau era Kīngitanga flag	The flag hoisted at Ngāruawāhia on the proclamation of Pōtatau Te Wherowhero as Māori king, drawn in 1863. It depicts some of the stars of the Southern Cross, as well as a cross in the upper left canton.
	1858–1860	Potatau Hei Kingi flag	A flag used during the reign of Pōtatau Te Wherowhero, the first Māori king. It depicts a white cross as a symbol of Christianity on top of a red background, which symbolizes mana or prestige in Māori culture. The lower right canton is coloured white and is inscribed with the words "POTATAU HEI KINGI".
	1894-1912	Personal Standard of Mahuta Tāwhiao	This flag is emblazoned with the name Kiingi Mahuta Tawhiao Potatau Te Wherowhero, the full name of Mahuta Tāwhiao, the third Māori King. The seven stars represent Matariki. The rainbow represents the god Uenuku and the canoe represents the Tainui waka.
	1966-2007	Personal Standard of Dame Te Atairangikaahu	A flag used during Dame Te Atairangikaahu's reign (1966–2006).
	2009-2024	Standard of King Tūheitia	On a blue field, the crest of the Kīngitanga coat of arms in black and white.
	?-present	The flag of the Kīngitanga	On a red field, the crest of the Kīngitanga coat of arms with the motto KO TE MANA MOTUHAKE beneath it, both in gold.

== See also ==
- Kīngitanga
- Flags of New Zealand
