= Mangatāwhiri River =

Coordinates: 37°17′S 175°03′E

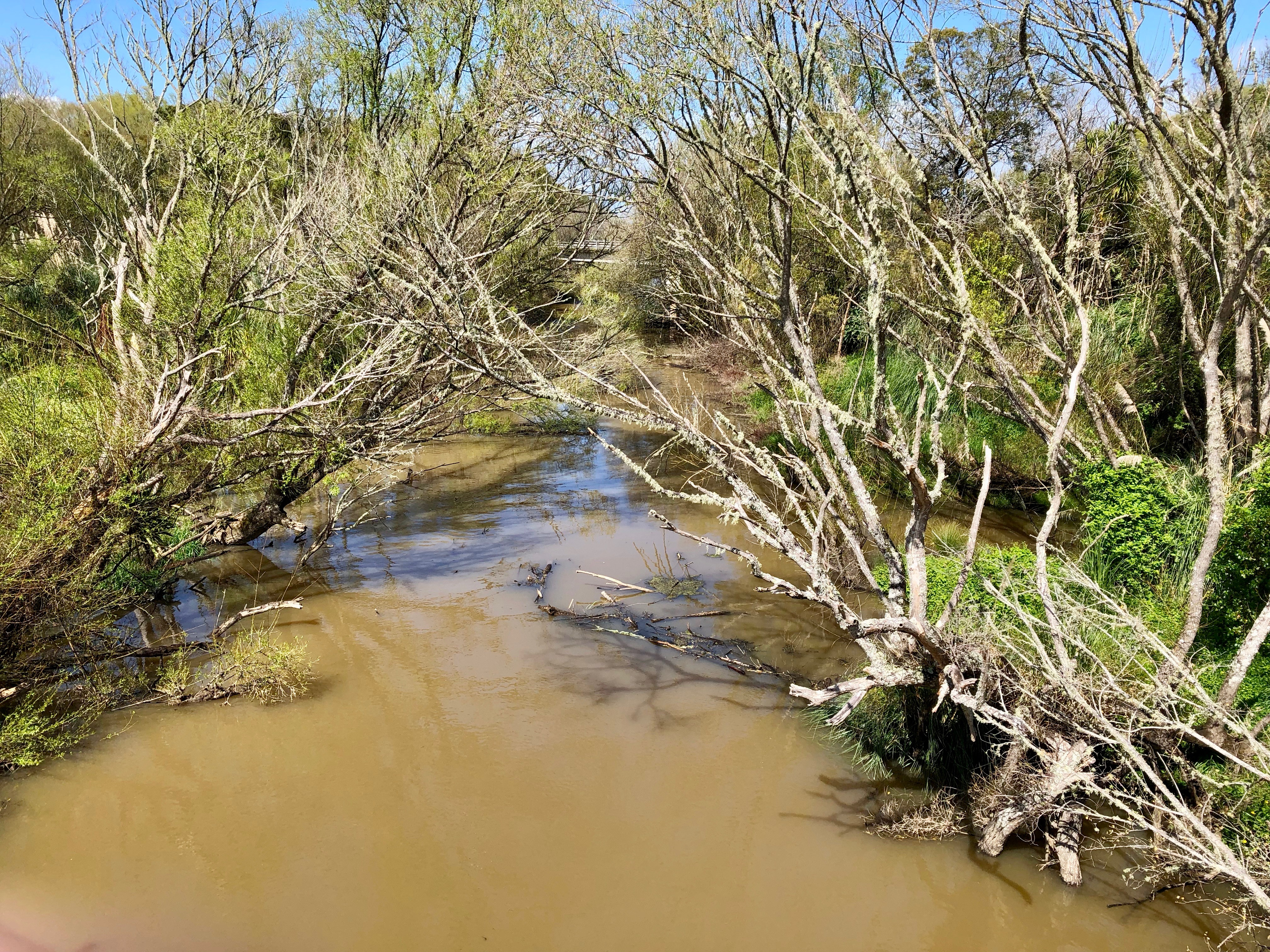
- Mangatāwhiri River between the old and new Great South Rd bridges

Location
- Country: New Zealand

Physical characteristics
- Mouth
  - location: Waikato River
- Length: 20 km (12 mi)
- Basin size: 104 km^{2} (40 sq mi)

The Mangatāwhiri River is a river of the Waikato region of New Zealand's North Island. It flows generally southwest from its sources in the Hunua Ranges southeast of Clevedon before flowing through a system of irrigation canals at the northern edge of the Waikato Plains close to the town of Pōkeno. It reaches the Waikato River close to the township of Mercer.

The New Zealand Ministry for Culture and Heritage gives a translation of "Tāwhiri tree stream" for Mangatāwhiri.

The upper reaches of the Mangatāwhiri are dammed to form reservoirs to store water for use by Auckland City.

== History ==
During a meeting of the Māori King movement at Peria agreed that they would consider the construction of a road across the river as a hostile act from the government. The crossing of the river by colonial forces is considered the start of the invasion of the Waikato.

== See also ==
- List of rivers of New Zealand
