= Tupu Atanatiu Taingakawa Te Waharoa =

New Zealand tribal leader, kingmaker and king movement leader

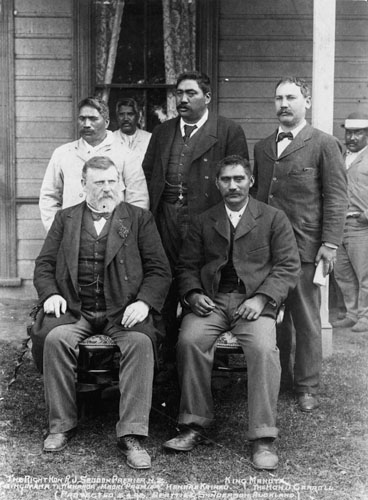
Front row from left: Richard Seddon, Premier; Mahuta Tāwhiao, Maori King. Second row from left: Tupu Taingakawa; Henare Kaihau, MP; James Carroll, MP. Taken at Huntly, New Zealand in 1898

Tupu Atanatiu Taingakawa Te Waharoa (c.1844 – 24 June 1929) was a notable New Zealand tribal leader, kingmaker and king movement leader. Of Māori descent, he identified with the Ngāti Hauā iwi. He was born in Maungakawa or Te Tapiri, Waikato, New Zealand, in about 1844. He was the son of Wiremu Tamihana Tarapipipi.
