= Peria =

Peria may refer to:

- Fereydan, also called Peria, is a county in the Province of Isfahan, Iran
- Peria, Northland, a locality in the Far North District of New Zealand. The Peria River flows through here
- Peria, Waikato, a locality in the Matamata-Piako District of New Zealand
- Peria (fruit), Malay name for Momordica charantia
