= Te Rata =

20th century Māori King (c. 1878–1933)

- Kiingi Maaori
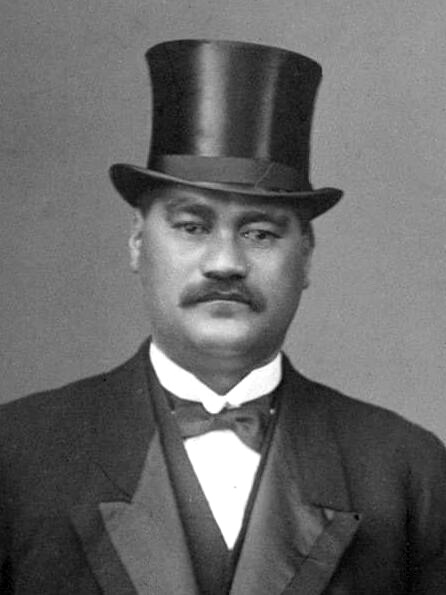
- Te Rata Mahuta in 1914

Māori King
- Reign: 1912–1933
- Predecessor: Mahuta Tāwhiao
- Successor: Korokī Mahuta
- Born: Te Rata Mahuta c. 1878
- Died: 1 October 1933 (aged 48–49)
- Burial: Mount Taupiri
- Spouse: Te Uranga
- Issue: Korokī; Taipū Mahuta; Makareta Hoete; Hori Te Rata
Regnal name
- Te Rata Mahuta Tawhiao Potatau Te Wherowhero
Posthumous name
- Te Rata Potatau Te Wherowhero IV
- House: House of Pōtatau (Te Kaahui-aariki)
- Father: Mahuta Tāwhiao
- Mother: Te Marae

Te Rata Mahuta (c. 1878 – 1 October 1933) was the fourth Māori King, reigning from 1912 to 1933.

== Biography ==
Te Rata was the eldest son of the third king, Mahuta, and Te Marae, daughter of the fighting chief Amukete Te Kerei, who was killed at the Battle of Rangiriri in November 1863. Te Rata was born sometime between 1877 and 1880. He had four younger brothers: Taipu (who died in March 1926), Tumate, Tonga and Te Rauangaanga. He married Te Uranga, daughter of Iriwhata Wharemaki and Hira Wati of Ngāti Korokī.

Te Rata was invested with the kingship on 24 November 1912, about two weeks after his father's death. Three months later a coronation ceremony was held at Te Kōpua, Raglan. As was the custom for a new Māori King, he assumed the title name of Pōtatau Te Wherowhero, beginning a kingship dogged by ill health and controversy.

Te Rata Mahuta had at least four children;

- Korokī Te Rata Mahuta Tāwhiao Potatau Te Wherowhero (m) (with Te Uranga),
- Taipu Mahuta (m) (with Te Uranga),
- Makareta Hoete Harris (Maihi-Parata) (f) (with Te Uranga),
- Hori (George) Te Rata (m) (with Maata Paora)

Korokī became Te Rata's successor upon his death. Of his other sons, Taipu had died in 1924, and Hori was not recognised at the insistence of Te Puea Herangi, Te Rata's influential cousin.

As a child, Te Rata had been a chronic invalid and had suffered several illnesses including rheumatoid arthritis and heart disease. The former greatly affected his ability to carry out his role as King. This was particularly apparent during an expedition to England in 1914. This expedition had been undertaken with the aim of presenting British officials with a petition concerning breaches of the Treaty of Waitangi; namely, that Māori land had been unjustly confiscated following the New Zealand wars.

However, during his voyage to England, Te Rata ended up suffering repeated attacks of rheumatics. For example, during a stop-over in Honolulu, he was unable to accept an invitation from the nation's ageing Queen Liliʻuokalani, the last ruler of her people prior to annexation. Furthermore, these attacks continued following his arrival in England on 21 May 1914. Indeed, Te Rata was so unwell that he ended up turning down a meeting with important British officials, although he eventually was able to meet with King George and Queen Mary.

He died at Waahi on 1 October 1933. New Zealand Labour Party leader Harry Holland died unexpectedly of a heart attack at his funeral.

Māori royalty
Preceded by Mahuta Tāwhiao	Māori King; 1912–1933	Succeeded by Korokī Mahuta
