= Tumate Mahuta =

Tumate Mahuta (c. 1893 – 29 April 1938) was a Māori King Movement leader and negotiator in New Zealand. He was the third surviving son of Mahuta, the third Māori King, and younger brother of the fourth king, Te Rata. He belonged to the Ngāti Mahuta iwi of the Waikato confederation.

== Biography ==
He was born at Waahi, Huntly, probably in July 1893, to Mahuta and his wife Te Marae, a daughter of Amukete (Amuketi) Te Kerei, a chief who was killed at the Battle of Rangiriri in 1863. His elder brothers were Te Rata and Taipu (who died in March 1926), and he had younger brothers Tonga and Te Rauangaanga. Before World War I, he wed Te Atarua (Piri) Herangi, younger sister of his cousin Te Puea, in an arranged marriage. They had one son, who died young.
