= William Nicholas Searancke =

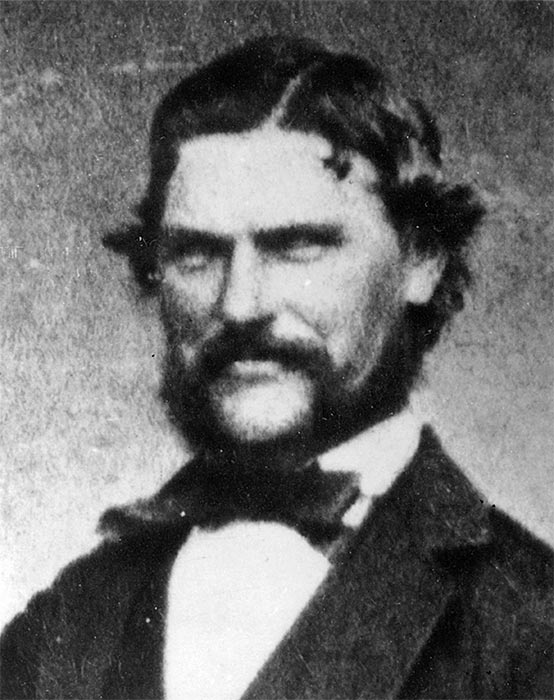
Searancke, date unknown

William Nicholas Searancke (born William George Niccoll Searancke; bapt. 11 April 1817 – 29 April 1904) was a New Zealand surveyor, land purchase commissioner, resident magistrate and land agent.

== Biography ==
He was born in St Albans Abbey, Hertfordshire, England in 1817. Searancke established two families, one Māori and later one Pākehā (English). A granddaughter of Searancke, Te Puea Herangi (also known as Princess Te Puea), became notable as a Māori leader in the early twentieth century.

In 1858, he was appointed District Commissioner in the Land Purchase Department in Wellington. He was sent to the Wairarapa. He had 4 children with Hariata Rangitaupua of Ngati Maniapoto. He had become notorious for negotiating secret deals and reneging on his promises. Searancke was exasperated with Wairarapa Māori, calling them unmitigated scoundrels. Searancke saw that Māori were very poor and would eventually sell. In 1858 he bought two large areas of Māori land-the Tupurupuru and Maungaraki blocks for the government.

In July 1869 Searanke was the resident magistrate in the Waikato. He was present when the renegade Te Kooti, who had escaped with many Hau Hau prisoners from the Chatham Islands came to Te Kuiti to confront the Maori King Tawhaio. Te Kooti had vowed on his arrival back in Gisborne to replace Tawhaio as Maori king of New Zealand. Searanke reported to the government that Te kooti's presence in the king country appeared to paralyze the Waikato. Te Kooti put the fear of god into them by ordering his 500 men to load their guns and fire over the heads of the approaching Waikato. Te Kooti then ordered them to bring all their greenstone to him which he destroyed. The standoff continued for over a week with Tawhaio refusing to even see Te Kooti who was deliberately snubbed, being forced to camp outside the village on the roadside in contravention of all normal protocol for visitors. From Te Kuiti Searancke travelled with Te Kooti and chief Horonuku, who had spoken out in favour of Te Kooti, to visit Louis Hetet, a French trader who was considered Maniapotos' pakeha. At the meeting Rewi abstained from drinking but Te Kooti got very drunk and talked at length about the reasons for his previous actions but not about his future plans. Searancke warned Te Kooti that his "escort" would prevent him travelling down the Mokau valley and obliged him to return to Taupo again.
