= John Kinder (priest) =

- John Kinder circa 1870 attributed to JD Richardson
- Born: 17 September 1819; London, United Kingdom
- Died: 5 September 1903 (aged 83); Remuera, Auckland, New Zealand
- Education: Trinity College, Cambridge
- Known for: photography; watercolour
- Notable work: From the Verandah of Mr Reader Wood's Cottage (1856); Kawau Island, Old Copper Mine (1857); At the bottom of a dark gully Coromandel – Kauri logs lying in the creek (circa 1866); Kotanui, Whangaparaoa (1868); Cliffs, Whangaparaaoa, near Auckland (1868)

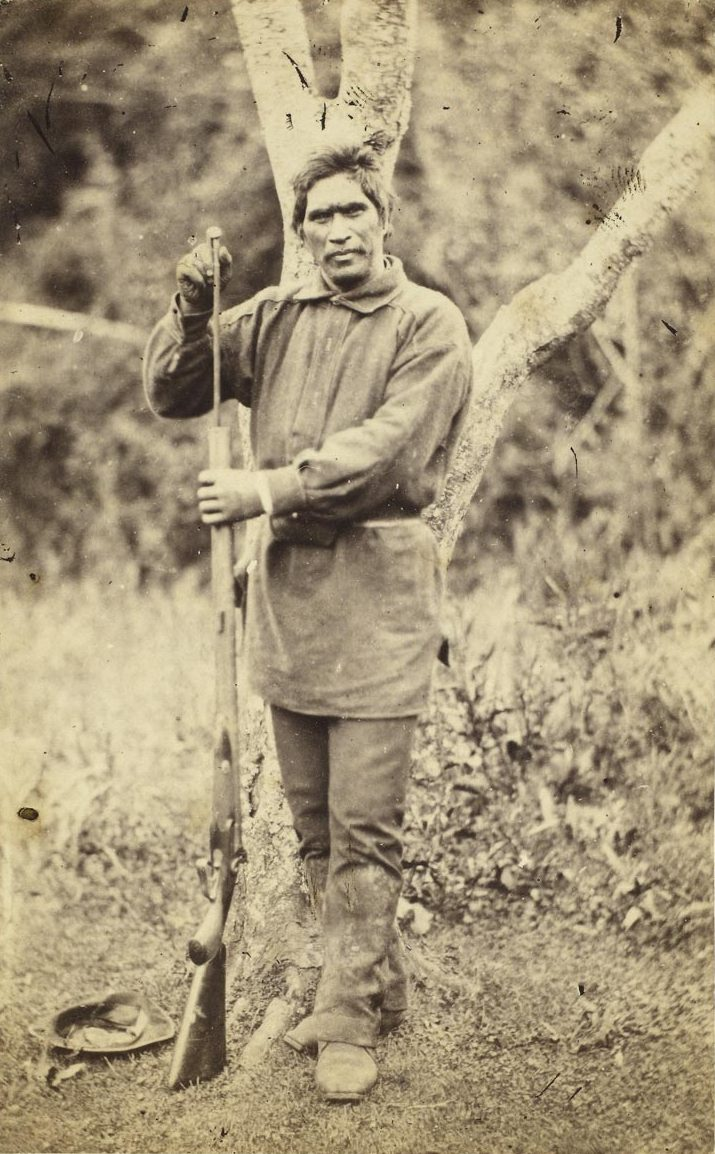
Wiremu Tamihana; photograph by Kinder, January 1863

John Kinder (17 September 1819 – 5 September 1903) was a British / New Zealand Anglican clergyman, teacher, artist and photographer.

== Life ==
Kinder was born in London, United Kingdom, on 17 September 1819, the oldest surviving child of a wealthy merchant and his second wife. In 1838 Kinder entered Trinity College, Cambridge, originally studying Mathematics but Classics and Theology were where his true interests lay. He graduated in 1842 and received his MA in 1845. While at Cambridge he joined the Cambridge Camden Society, a group interested in church architecture.

Kinder was ordained as a priest of the Church of England in 1848 after ordination as a deacon in 1846. In 1848, Kinder became Master at Alleyne's Grammar School in Uttoxeter, where he remained for eight years. However, after he was petitioned to be removed from his post due to his strict religious practices, he was interviewed by Bishop George Selwyn to relocate to Auckland, New Zealand to be the headmaster of the Church of England Grammar School. Kinder began his journey to New Zealand in July 1855. He moved into the newly built headmaster's house across the road from the school which is now known as Kinder House. During the New Zealand Land Wars of the 1860s, Kinder was a chaplain to the British Forces.

On 15 December 1859, at Te Papa in Tauranga, Kinder married Marianne Celia Brown, only daughter of Archdeacon Alfred Brown of Remuera. The couple had no children of their own, but they adopted the children of Kinder's youngest brother Henry after he was murdered in 1865.

In 1872, Kinder became the Master of St John's College in Tamaki. Kinder received a Doctor of Divinity in 1873 from the Archbishop of Canterbury.

== Painting and photography ==
While most of Kinder's life was devoted to theology and education, he became known after his death as an artist and photographer. Most of his work centred around landscape and architectural portraits. He is particularly known for his watercolour paintings. One of his most well known photographic works was the portrait of Wiremu Tamihana, which was used as the front cover of the 1864 book, The Maori King by John Gorst. Kinder's photographs of Parnell in the 1860s have been preserved as a historical record of colonial Auckland. His works as an artist and photographer have only been exhibited on a few occasions. They were first shown in 1871 and again 1873 by the Auckland Society of Artists of which Kinder was a founding member.

== Death and legacy ==
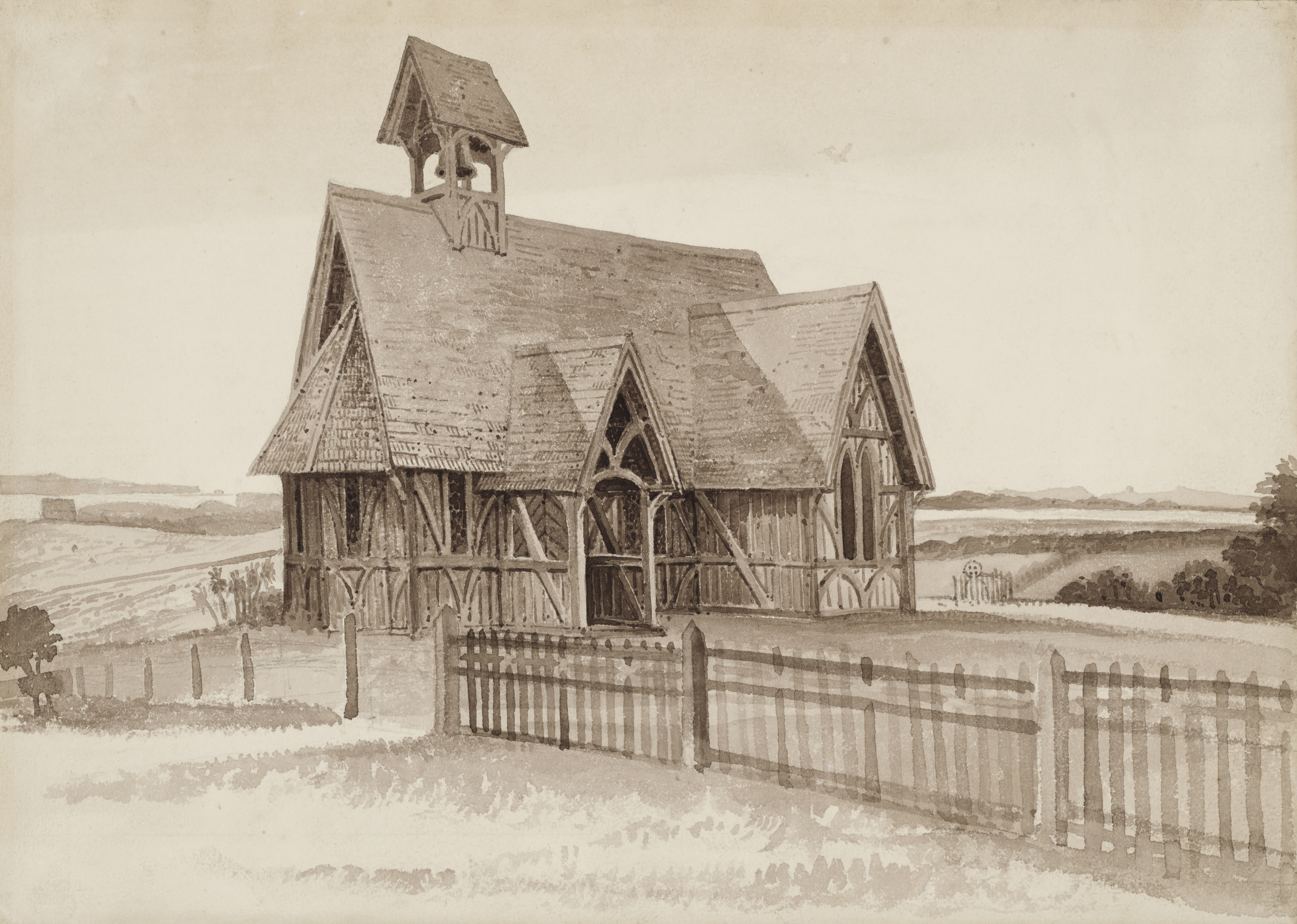
Kinder's sketch of St John's College Chapel, 1870s

Kinder died on 5 September 1903, aged 83, in Remuera, Auckland, and was buried at St John's College. The John Kinder Theological Library is the library and archives for St John's College as well as for the Anglican Church in Aotearoa New Zealand and Polynesia.

From September 2013 to April 2014, Kinder was the subject of an exhibition at the Auckland Art Gallery titled Kinder's Presence.

A topographical map of Auckland which Kinder drew is now held in the Hocken Library in Dunedin.
