= Robert Mahuta =

New Zealand Māori leader

Sir Robert Mahuta KNZM
- Born: Robert Jeremiah Ormsby; 26 April 1939; Te Kūiti, New Zealand
- Died: 1 February 2001 (aged 61); Hamilton, New Zealand
- Other name: Robert Te Kotahi Mahuta
- Occupation: Politician
- Known for: Treaty of Waitangi negotiations
- Relatives: Nanaia Mahuta (daughter); Korokī Mahuta (father); Te Atairangikaahu (sister); Piupiu Te Wherowhero (grandmother)

Academic background
- Education: University of Auckland
- Thesis: Whaikoorero a study of formal Maori speech (1974)

Sir Robert Te Kotahi Mahuta KNZM (26 April 1939 – 1 February 2001) was a prominent Māori politician. He was born Robert Jeremiah Ormsby and changed his name by deed poll.

Mahuta was the first Māori leader to negotiate a satisfactory compensation settlement with the New Zealand government for tribal land confiscated under European settlement in the fledgling colony. In a deal completed in late 1994, he won a package worth NZ$170m for his Tainui tribe for the seizure of 485,000 hectares of land in the North Island's Waikato region 131 years earlier. Significantly for all Māori, the settlement included the first formal apology given by the Crown to the indigenous people for historical wrongs during colonisation.

== Family ==
He was born Robert Jeremiah Ormsby in Te Kūiti, on 26 April 1939. His father, also Robert Jeremiah Ormsby, was Māori. His mother was Te Amohia Ormsby, and his maternal grandmother was Piupiu Te Wherowhero, a leader within the kahui ariki (Māori royal family). Piupiu was a daughter of Te Wherowhero, the younger son of King Tāwhiao.

Robert Ormsby was adopted by King Korokī at four weeks old, and became the brother of Princess Piki, later the Māori Queen, Dame Te Atairangikaahu. He changed his name by deed poll to Robert Te Kotahi Mahuta when he was 24.

Mahuta married Raiha (née Edmonds) in 1964 and had one son and two daughters. His eldest is a son Tukaroto Mahuta (who has three sons and a daughter). His elder daughter, Nanaia, is a Labour MP (and has one son) and his younger daughter is Tipa (who has one daughter and a granddaughter).

== Career ==
Mahuta studied at the University of Auckland and the title of his master's thesis was Whaikōrero a study of formal Māori speech. He was the director of Māori Studies and Research at the University of Waikato from 1972 to 1977. He studied at Wolfson College, Oxford, in 1977. Mahuta served as a Treaty of Waitangi fisheries commissioner, chairman of the Māori Development Corporation and chairman of the Tainui Māori Trust Board. For his services to the Māori people, he was appointed a Knight Companion of the New Zealand Order of Merit in the 1996 Queen's Birthday Honours.

== Tributes ==
He died in Hamilton aged 61. Robert Mahuta was a "warrior in the true sense", said former Member of Parliament Sir Douglas Graham.

"Sir Robert's achievements are unsurpassed, irrespective of the troubles in recent times," said former Minister of Māori Affairs, Parekura Horomia.
