= Peria, Waikato =

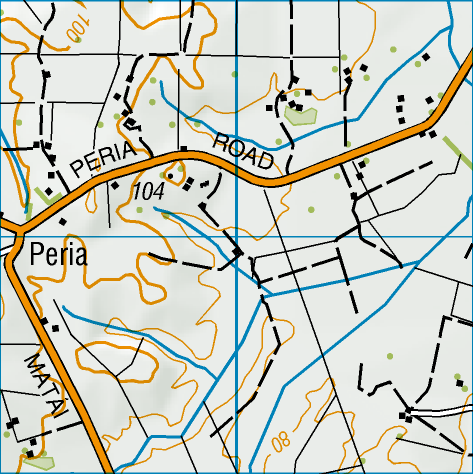
Map of Peria

Peria is a former Maori village and locality in the Matamata Plains. Peria was established by Wiremu Tamihana as an agricultural settlement with the Ten Commandments as the tenets of the village. By the 1850s this had become the main Ngati Haua settlement. The settlement boasted its own church, school, and post office and hosted a meeting for the Maori king movement. Despite the prosperity the settlement became abandoned during the invasion of the Waikato and most of Tamihana's followers left to join the Hauhaus. Today little trace of the village is left with the area being rural land holdings.

== Geography ==
Peria is located 6 km (3.7 mi) west of Matamata.

== History ==
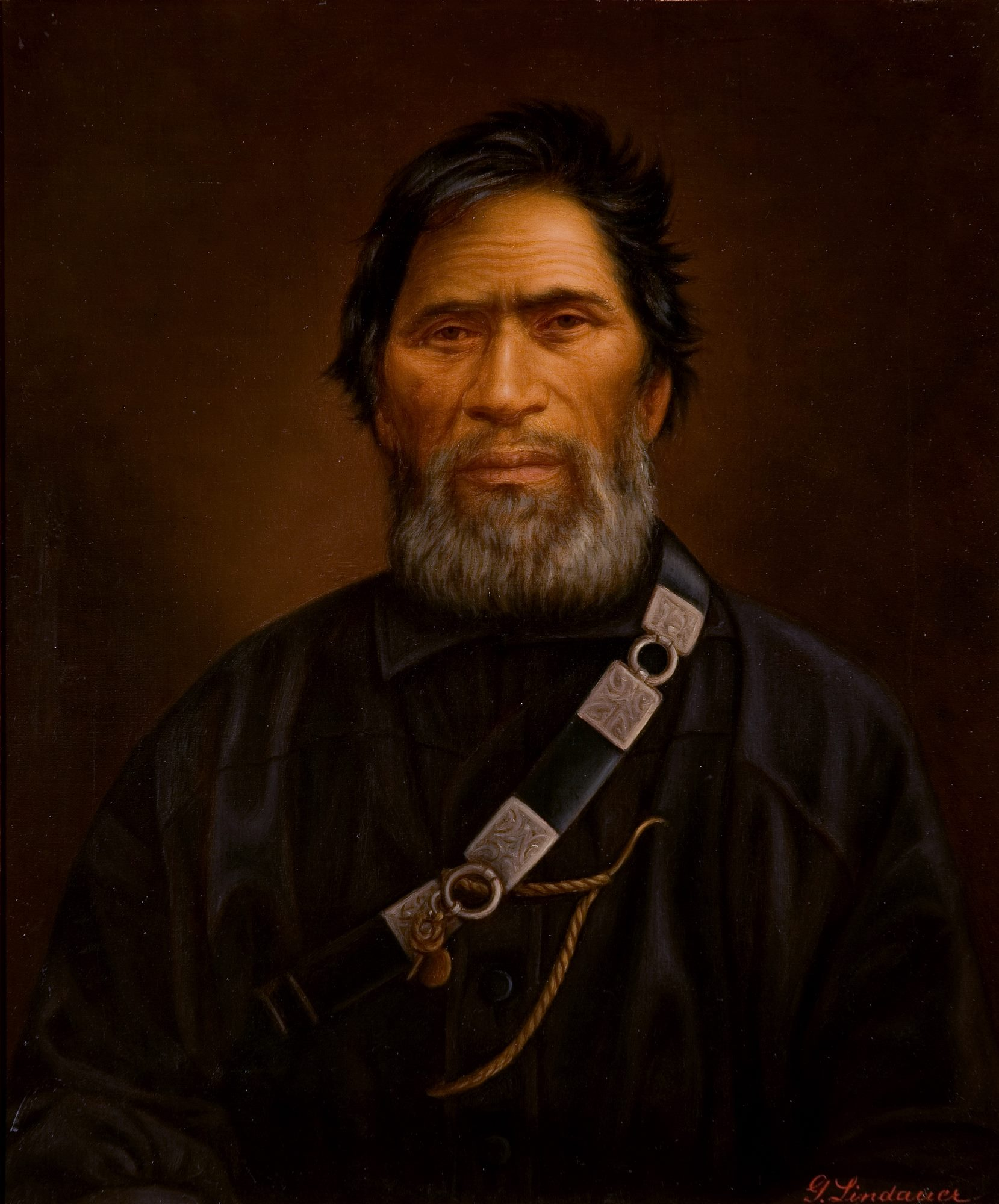
Wiremu Tamihana

Peria was established as an agricultural settlement by Wiremu Tamihana following his departure from Te Tapiri in 1846. The devout Tamihana named the settlement after Beroea, an ancient city mentioned in the Bible and had the Ten Commandments displayed around the village. Afterwards, up until the 1850s more Ngāti Hauā members followed Tamihana to Peria and it became the main Ngati Haua settlement.

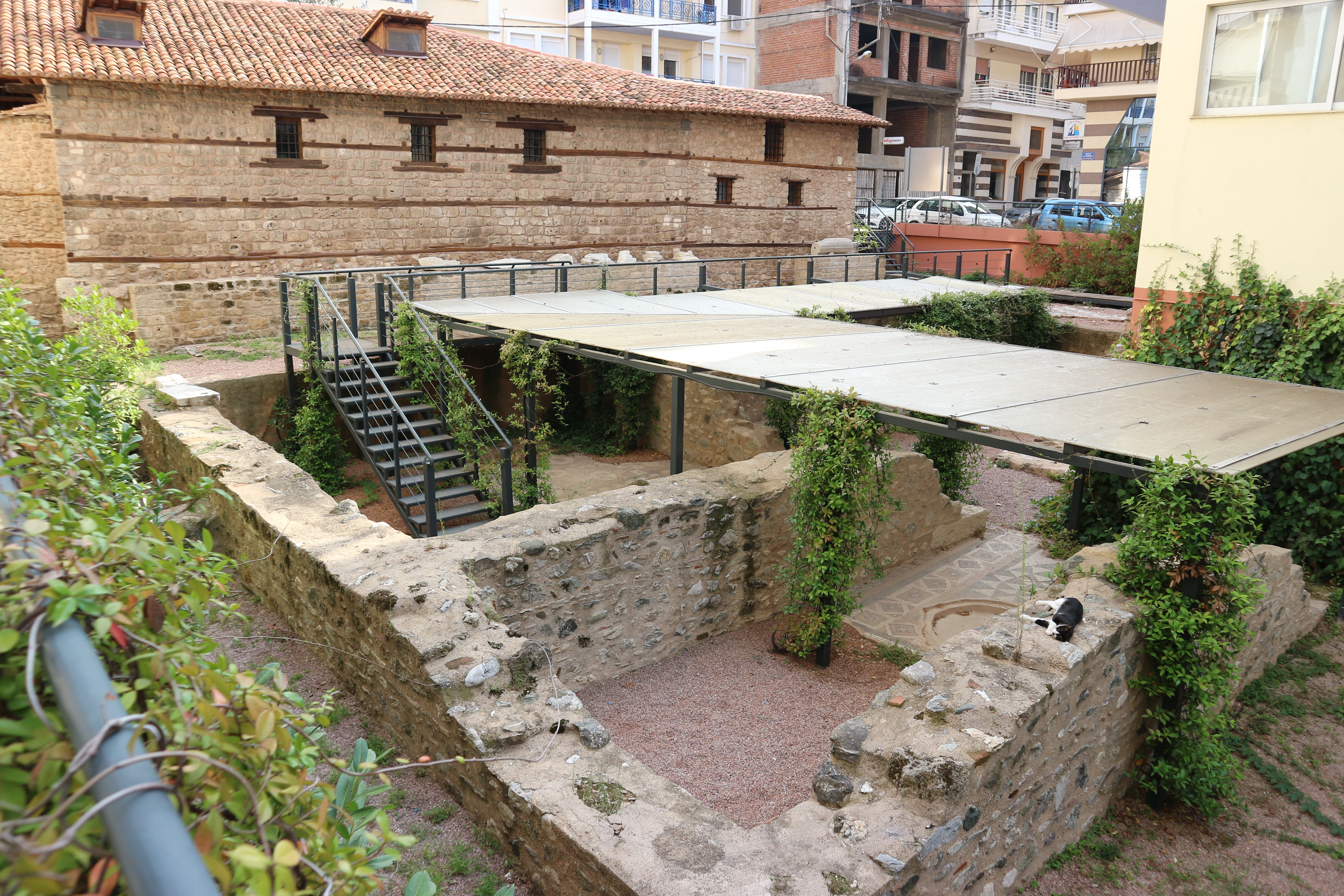
Peria was named after the city of Beroea, mentioned in Acts 17.

Josiah Clifton Firth described his 1856 visit to Peria. He wrote of a prosperous agricultural settlement with its own Mãori church, school, meeting hall, and post office. According to Firth the settlement became abandoned 15 years later.

CMS missionary John Alexander Wilson visited Peria in June 1861. His account noted that the boarding school had 20 children, down from around 60 to 100 prior to the Taranaki War but that the settlement was still well off producing ample wheat.

John Eldon Gorst visited Peria in October 1861 as part of his assessment of schools in the district. Gorst's report gives the most detail about the school in Peria: Gorst reported that the boarding school was 2 miles (3.2 km) downwards of Peria and had two separate schools for boys and girls a furlong apart. Gorst recorded 14 students and 3 teachers, despite a decline in roll from 63 prior to the war the school remained in 'excellent order and discipline'. Mathematics was instructed in English but the students were not able to read and write in English due to an inability to secure a native English speaker as a teacher. Despite the lack of English literacy all the students were fully literate in the Maori language. Gorst noted Peria had 20 acres (8.1 ha) of wheat planted, which was used to fund the school as it did not receive any government aid. A later account that year by Henry Hanson Turton paints a different picture reporting that many of the students wore rags and some lacked bedding. Turton's account is less likely to be reliable than Gorst's however.

From 23–26 October 1862 Peria hosted an assembly for the Māori King movement, with tribes from across the North Island attending. The issues discussed were the Waitara purchase, the development of roads from Auckland into the central North Island, and how to resolve land disputes. Tamihana delivered a sermon encouraging Māori to unite under the Māori king. Leaders of the Māori king movement agreed that they would not allow the government to construct a road that crossed the Mangatāwhiri River, which they saw as the boundary of their land.

The governance of Peria was influenced by both Biblical law, English law, and traditional Maori customs. Peria was governed by a rūnanga (tribal council). Tamihana had a preference for Mosaic and Levitical law and established a law against adultery, although the punishment was financial. Bishop Selwyn noted on his visit to the nearby Maungatautari that in response to asking if he could leave his belongings unattended a man told that no one steals, with some fearing God and others fearing the five pound fine Tamihana enforced.

The settlement hosted Te Koheriki and his men following their retreat after the Battle of Rangiriri. Tamihana returned to Peria following his formal surrender on 27 May 1865 and found the settlement largely deserted as most of the inhabitants joined the Hauhaus.

In 1867—after Tamihana's death—Firth called a meeting at Peria for Maori and unveiled an obelisk dedicated to Tamihana. The obelisk had both a Maori and English transcription:

William Thompson Te Waharoa died here

on the 27th day of December 1866. This was his last sentence: -

‘Tell Mr Firth, if he is willing to reside here continually, I am agreeable.’

Little trace of the village is left in the 21st-century: the area is now rural landholdings, with the name Peria surviving in the road that connects to Matamata.
