= Wiremu Tamihana =

Māori chief and political leader

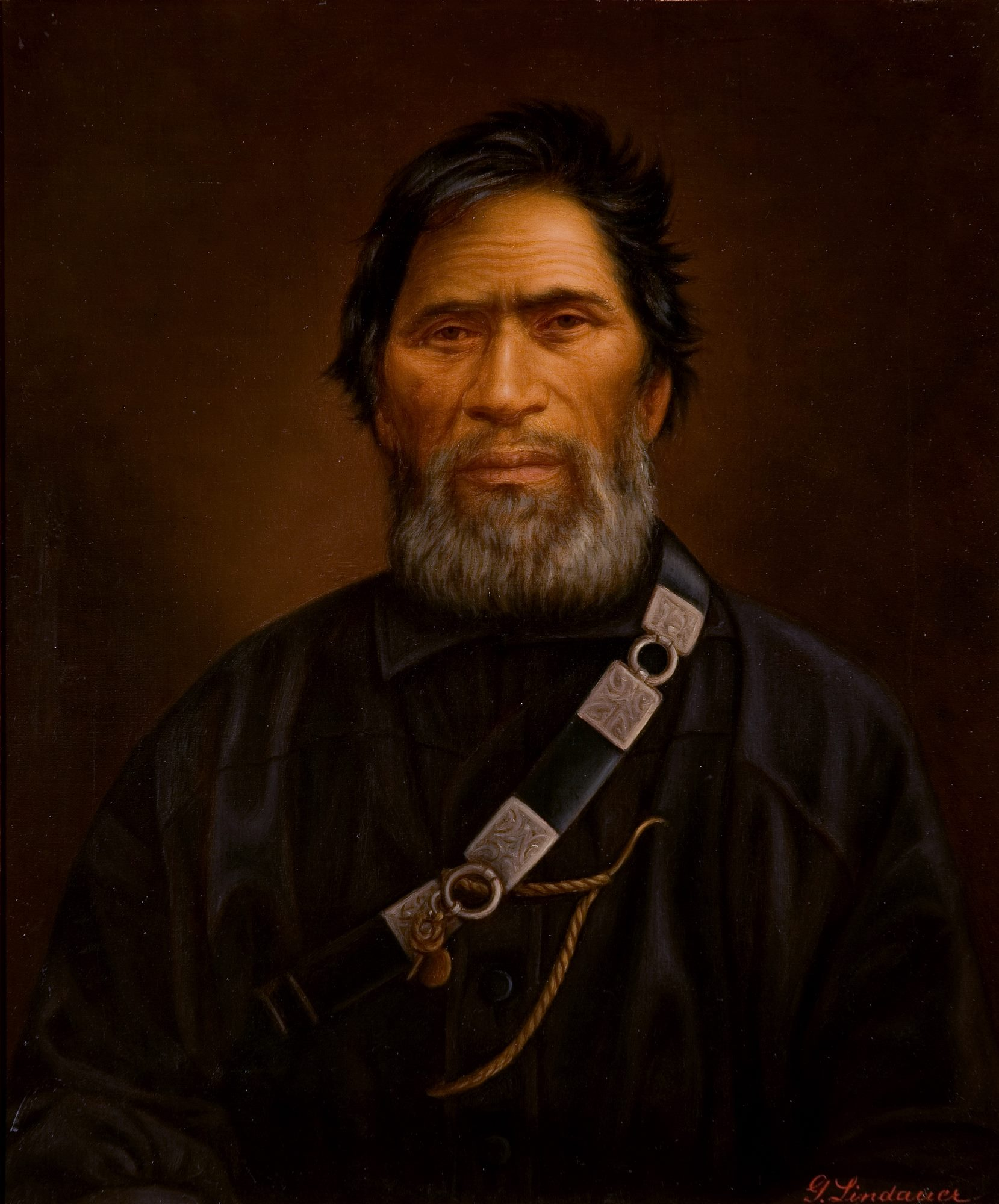
- Portrait of Wiremu Tamihana by Gottfried Lindauer
- Born: c. 1805
- Died: 27 December 1866

Wiremu Tamihana Tarapipipi Te Waharoa (c. 1805 – 27 December 1866), generally known as Wiremu Tamihana or by his English name William Thompson, was a leader of the Ngāti Hauā Māori iwi in nineteenth century New Zealand, and is sometimes known as the kingmaker for his role in the Māori King Movement.

== Early life ==
Tarapipipi Te Waharoa was born around 1805 at Tamahere on the Horotiu plains, the son of the Māori chief Te Waharoa and Rangi Te Wiwini. His father was the leader of the tribe Ngāti Hauā, which settled the area along the Waikato River near Horotiu as far east as the Kaimai Ranges. In his youth he fought in several expeditions that took place in the Taranaki and Waikato as part of the Musket Wars.

In 1835 Tarapipipi met Reverend A. N. Brown, who had set up a Church Mission Society (CMS) station near the Matamata pā. He was taught to read and write in the Māori language and soon would become a key communicator for his father. Tarapipipi was baptised as William Thompson (Wiremu Tamihana in Māori) on 23 June 1839. He was still from time to time engaged in outbreaks of intertribal warfare, particularly against Te Arawa tribes; during one raid in the Rotorua region, he intervened to ensure the safety of two missionaries during the destruction of the CMS station at Ohinemutu by the Te Arawa tribe Ngāti Whakaue, with whom Ngāti Hauā was fighting. The conflict at this time led to Brown abandoning the CMS station at Matamata and shifting to Tuaranga but he continued to influence Tarapipipi with his Christian teachings.

== As chief ==
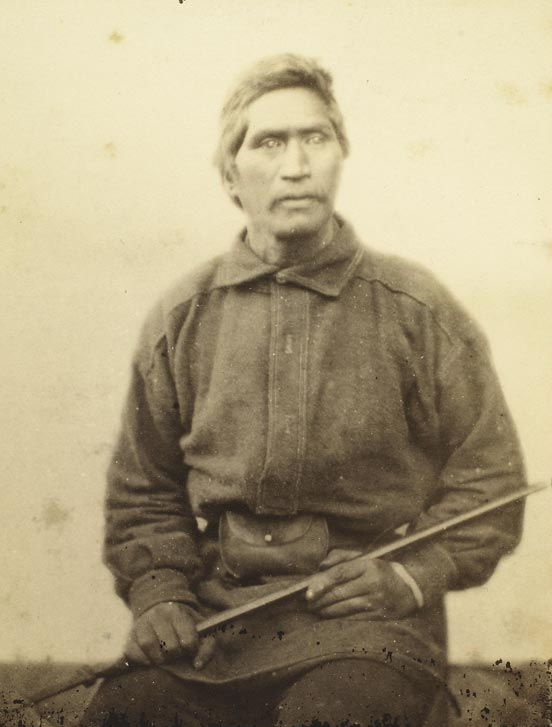
Photograph of Wiremu Tamihana by John Kinder (1863)

Following the death of his father in September 1838, Tarapipipi became a leader of Ngāti Hauā despite being the second oldest son. He quickly stamped his authority as chief, when he resisted efforts by his tribe to carry out raids against Te Arawa. In October 1838, wielding a bible and referring to Christian ideals, he made an impassioned plea at a hui of Tauranga and Ngāti Hauā Māori against war with Te Arawa. His efforts prevented a major battle between the tribes although there some isolated fighting.

Soon after taking over as chief of Ngāti Hauā, Tarapipipi had founded a new pā near Matamata, naming it Te Tapiri with rules based on the Ten Commandments. By the following year, there were 300 people living at Te Tapiri, which now included a chapel and a school. By this time, Tarapipipi had converted to Christianity, being baptised by Brown at Tauranga and given the Christian name Wiremu Tamihana, which translates to William Thomson.

In 1846 Tamihana left Te Tapiri and founded Peria. The devout Tamihana named the settlement after Beroea, an ancient city mentioned in the Bible and had the Ten Commandments displayed around the village. Afterwards, up until the 1850s more Ngati Haua members followed Tamihana to Peria. Tamihana established a successful agricultural settlement with its own school. Tamihana believed the model he established at Peria with Christian laws would be a good model for governance of Maori society and was the reason for attempting to establish the Māori King Movement.

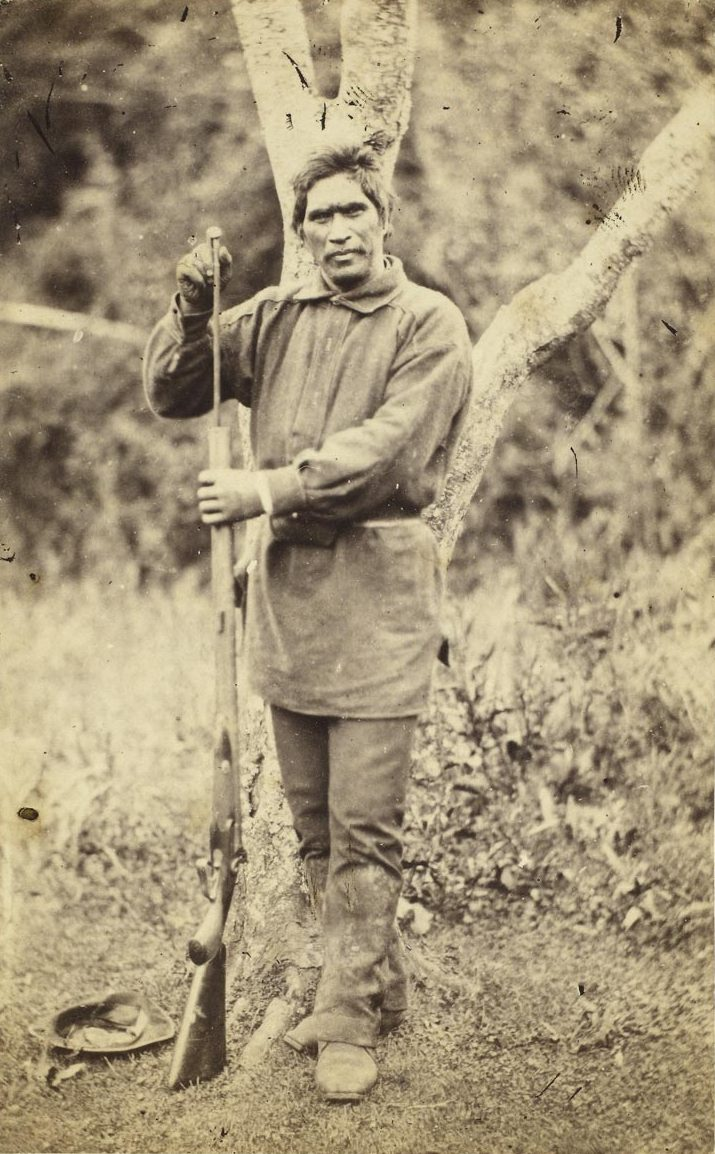
Wiremu Tamihana Tarpipipi Te Waharoa; portrait by John Kinder, January 1863

== Māori King Movement ==
In the late 1850s, Tamihana was largely responsible for the establishment of the Māori King Movement, which aimed to unify rebel Māori by setting up a kingship in opposition to the British government. He was able to persuade several iwi to join the movement, and Potatau Te Wherowhero of Ngāti Mahuta to take on the role of first King. Tamihana provided a statement of laws, based on the Bible. Although the movement was seen by many Pākehā and the government as rebellion, Tamihana intended that the Māori King would be in alliance with Queen Victoria. Tamihana became a diplomat and publicist for the movement, founding a Māori language newspaper for it. In 1861 Governor Thomas Gore Browne issued a declaration demanding Māori submission to the British Crown. Tamihana wrote to him explaining that the King Movement was not in conflict with the Queen but refused to swear the oath of allegiance. He expressed concern that the Governor seemed intent on war but failed to see the implications of rebellion. Later, he wrote a series of 14 threatening letters to Grey who realised that Tamihana was backed by the fierce Rewi Maniapoto. When war did break out, after the killing of 7 British soldiers in a time of peace in Taranaki and the attempted murder of Gorst, a government agent at Te Awamutu, Tamihana remained in favour of negotiation, but others within the King Movement, such as Rewi Maniapoto preferred to fight. Throughout the Invasion of the Waikato Tamihana attempted to negotiate with government forces, to little effect. In May 1865 MP George Graham met Tamihana at Peria and negotiated for him to formally surrender. On 27 May Tamihana surrendered to Carey at Tamahere. Many in Tamihana's tribe joined the Hauhau movement of their dissatisfaction of the land confiscation and surrender.

Following Tamihana's surrender Peria was deserted as many of his tribe joined the Hauhaus. Tamihana's influence had waned in favour of the more radical Rewi Maniapoto. He spoke with government officials in an attempt to convince them that the threat of a Maori rebellion was unfounded, but to little avail. George Grey attempted to meet with Tamihana on several occasions but Tamihana refused, partly out of fear of arrest. On 1 May 1866 Tamihana met with Grey in Hamilton. Tamihana expressed his dissatisfaction with how most of the Ngati Haua lands were confiscated whilst the more rebellious and violent Ngati Maniapoto had kept most of their lands — Grey dismissed these concerns and called for Tamihana to testify before the Maori Affairs Committee. On 13 July Tamihana travelled from Kerepihi to Wellington aboard HMS Esk. Tamihana spoke before parliament on 3 August and presented a petition calling for the return of Ngati Haua lands and for his name to be cleared of the accusation he had joined the Hauhaus — the petition was rejected by parliament. Tamihana returned to the Waikato and promoted pacifism, urging Maori to lay down arms and abandoning his stance on not selling or leasing his lands to the Crown.

== Later life and legacy ==
On 24 December 1866 Tamihana—his health deteriorating—invited Josiah Clifton Firth to hear his parting words. Tamihana died on the 27th. In 1867 Firth called a meeting at Peria for Maori and unveiled an obelisk dedicated to Tamihana. The obelisk had both a Maori and English transcription:

William Thompson Te Waharoa died here on the 27th day of December 1866. This was his last sentence: ‘Tell Mr Firth, if he is willing to reside here continually, I am agreeable.’

Despite being sidelined at the end of his life Tamihana enjoys a positive reputation in death; the CMS missionary Richard Taylor wrote that if the government listened to Tamihana the later New Zealand wars could have been averted.

...by his aid, had he been admitted to our councils, a permanent good feeling might have been established between the two races. But Thompson is no more; and, as a chief said when petitioning for the restoration of his land, ‘We are like the morning mist which for a while hovers over the earth, and when the sun arises disappears’; – so has it been with him, but still the memory of his acts and deeds will long survive.

CMS missionary John Alexander Wilson wrote positively of Tamihana when recounting a visit he had to Peria in June 1861.

... the most intelligent and patriotic I have met amongst his countrymen, in manner kind, courteous, and hospitable, and, as far as words go, open and honest in intention

Tamihana continues to be recognised today, with the NZ Herald naming him one of the 10 greatest New Zealanders of the past 150 years and the new main connector road between SH21 (Airport Road) and Devine Road running along the public reserve in the heart of Tamahere bears his name : Wiremu Tamihana Drive.

In 2022 a pou and information board about Tamihana was unveiled in Bruntwood.
