= Tonga Mahuta =

Tonga Mahuta (c. 1897 – 13 March 1947) was a New Zealand tribal leader. He was the fourth surviving son of Mahuta, the third Māori King, and a younger brother of the fourth king, Te Rata. He belonged to the Ngati Mahuta iwi of the Waikato confederation.

Tonga was one of five sons of Mahuta and Te Marae, a daughter of Amukete (Amuketi) Te Kerei, a chief who was killed at the Battle of Rangiriri in 1863. He was probably born in Hukanui, Waikato, in 1897. His elder brothers were Te Rata, Taipu (who died in March 1926) and Tumate, and he had a younger brother Te Rauangaanga.

He also played rugby league and represented the South Auckland team Waikato. In 1922 he was part of the team which won the Northern Union Challenge Cup from Auckland 21-20.

In 1935, he was awarded the King George V Silver Jubilee Medal.
