= Te Puea Hērangi =

Waikato woman of mana, Kingitanga leader (1883–1952)

Princess Te Puea Hērangi CBE
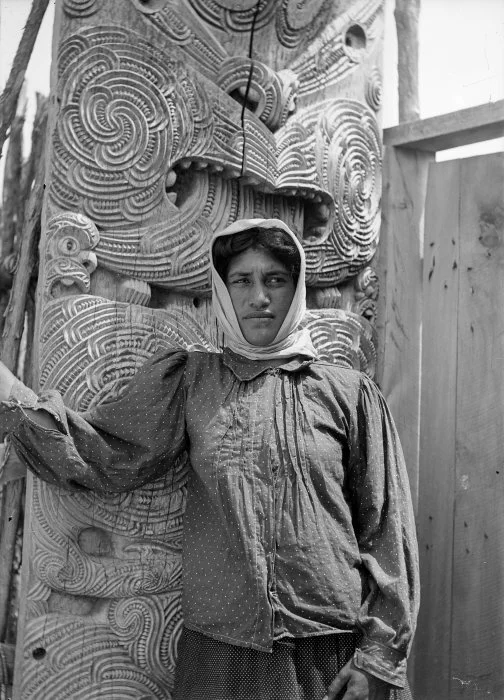
- Photo portrait of Te Puea Hērangi next to a carved figure at Rotorua
- Born: Te Puea Hērangi; 9 November 1883; Whatiwhatihoe, near Pirongia, Waikato, New Zealand
- Died: 12 October 1952 (aged 68); New Zealand
- Other name: Princess Te Puea
- Years active: 1911–1952
- Known for: Leadership of the Kīngitanga movement, preservation of Māori culture
- Notable work: Collection of waiata (songs), whakapapa (genealogies), and kōrero tawhito (history)

Te Puea Hērangi CBE (9 November 1883 – 12 October 1952), known by the name Princess Te Puea, was a Māori leader from New Zealand's Waikato region. Her mother, Tiahuia, was the elder sister of King Mahuta.

== Early life ==
She was born on 9 November 1883 at Whatiwhatihoe, near Pirongia, in the Waikato, daughter of Te Tahuna Hērangi and Tiahuia. Te Tahuna Hērangi was the son of Hariara Rangitaupua (Ngāti Maniapoto rangatira), and William Nicholas Searancke, an English surveyor. Tiahuia was daughter of the second Māori king, Tāwhiao Te Wherowhero, by his principal wife.

Te Puea was educated in the traditional Māori ways, particularly by her uncle, and successor of Tawhiao, Mahuta. At age 11 she began attending Mercer Primary School and then the following year Mangere Bridge School and a year after that Melmerly College in Parnell, where she had to speak English. She was fluent in speaking and writing Māori and she could speak English, but her written English was very poor.

When her mother died in 1898, Te Puea returned home reluctantly at the age of 15, supposedly to take her mother's place. However, becoming very sick with tuberculosis and believing she would die of it, she sought pleasures in life, drinking to excess and engaging in many sexual relationships. Some relationships amounted to customary marriage, but did not last long. One such relationship was with a Pākehā (New Zealander of European descent) man, an alcoholic and frequent gambler, whom she lived with at Māngere. Her family and tribe disapproved and it seemed she had left her family responsibilities, and even her Māori life. This phase ended in 1911 after a chance meeting with Mahuta, who asked her to return to the tribe, which she refused, but then relented when he threatened to commit suicide.

== Leadership role ==
She returned to her people and resumed her hereditary role in her late twenties. She settled at Mangatāwhiri and began dairy farming. She began collecting and recording waiata (songs), whakapapa (genealogies) and kōrero tawhito (history) from her extended family. Her first leadership task, the one that re-established her mana among her people, was, at the wish of Mahuta to successfully campaign on behalf of Māui Pōmare in his election bid to become the Kingite Member of Parliament, replacing Henare. Te Puea later fell out with Pōmare because he supported Māori soldiers fighting for New Zealand overseas. Te Puea worked against this behind Pōmare's back. He became aware of her attitude and in the winter of 1918 attended an anti-conscription hui called by Te Puea where he was roundly abused by all the elders of the Kīngitanga. Te Puea's support base was mainly with the lower Waikato tribes initially – she was a minor figure for up-river iwi such as Maniapoto.

Because of Waikato's anti-government stance on conscription during WW1 and Te Puea's personal involvement in hiding conscripts, she was not a popular figure with government or local Pākehā after WW1. After WW1, farmers were reluctant to offer Kingites work and during the Royal visit of the Prince of Wales the Kingites' desire to host the prince was snubbed in favour of an Arawa visit that was open to all Māori to attend. Arawa had been selected as they had the experience and facilities to host a large Māori occasion. They were an iwi that had remained loyal to the government, taking an active part against the Kingites in the land wars and playing a full role in WW1.

== Achievements ==
She was soon acknowledged as one of the leaders of the Kīngitanga Movement and worked to make it part of the central focus of the Māori people. Drawing inspiration from Tawhiao, Te Puea was firmly opposed to conscription when it was introduced in 1917. She led an anti-conscription movement in Waikato-Maniapoto, including leading non-violent protest while providing a refuge at her farm in Mangatawhiri for those who refused to be conscripted into the New Zealand Army.

During 1913 and 1914 the Māori community suffered a smallpox epidemic. Many Pākehā hospitals refused to treat Māori, and many Māori distrusted western medical professionals and believed that disease was a punishment from displeased spirits, refusing to go to Pākehā hospitals. In response, Te Puea set up a small settlement of nīkau huts devoted to nursing people back to health. This was successful as not one person died and the isolation of the village largely prevented spread of disease.

Following the influenza epidemic of 1918, she took under her wing elderly lacking care, and some 100 orphans, who were the founding members of the community of Tūrangawaewae at Ngāruawāhia. It was through Tūrangawaewae that Te Puea began to extend her influence beyond the Waikato Region. The construction of its carved meeting house was strongly supported by Sir Āpirana Ngata and the Ngāti Porou people. She became friendly with the Prime Minister, Gordon Coates who was raised in a rural community where many Māori lived, and with journalist Eric Ramsden who publicised her tours and the development of the Kīngitanga base at Tūrangawaewae. Coates was keen to lift Waikato Māori out of their sullen depression by addressing land grievances. Coates had been shocked at the conditions in which Waikato Māori lived-calling them the poorest people he had seen in his life. It was through her friendship with Ramsden that articles about her and her work began to appear in the national newspapers. In these she was usually identified as Princess Te Puea, a title that she herself deplored, saying that the role of princess does not exist in Māoritanga. Pōmare pointed out that neither does King.

Te Puea's main drives were to establish Tūrangawaewae as a base for the Kīngitanga, and rebuild mana and economic stability, but she was always short of funds. In 1922 she decided to raise money for her ambitious building programme. She and her people worked under contract for manual labour, and started a Māori concert party called Te Pou o Mangawhiri. Choosing this name (the place where General Cameron crossed into rebel held territory in 1863) she hoped to remind the Pākehā of the war and the confiscations. TPM, as it was known, travelled around New Zealand performing haka, poi dances, Hawaiian hula dances, with steel guitars, mandolins, banjos and ukuleles. In a three-month tour the group saved 900 pounds which was used to build a new kitchen dining room. Te Puea restarted the Kīngitanga taxation scheme whereby all Kīngitanga supporters were required to pay levies to support Kīngatanga programmes. This was commonly called the whitebait levy. At other times Te Puea levied every supporter for an additional donation of 2s 6d. Te Puea was known to keep meticulous records of these finances. These efforts allowed the purchasing of land in Ngauruwahia, stolen from Māori in the 1860s.

Mahuta's widow Te Marae selected Rāwiri Kātipa, later known as Tūmōkai, as a husband for Te Puea in 1922. Both were reluctant because he was 21 years old and she was 38, but they accepted and were married. Te Puea was unable to have children.

=== Tour of the East Coast and controversy over gifted farm ===
During her tour of the East Coast in the late 1930s Te Puea visited Ngāti Porou marae where, to her surprise, she was accepted, despite her links to the King movement which Ngāti Porou had always despised for its isolation and backwardness. For her part Te Puea was surprised at the affluence that Ngāti Porou enjoyed as well as their acceptance of European lifestyle. The East coast tour was a great success and raised more money for Tūrangawaewae buildings. Following this she was invited to Wellington to take part in a wide range of official and social arrangements. Te Puea used the contacts she had made, especially with Māori MP and minister Āpirana Ngata to further her development of the Kīngitanga base. However, many Māori in the Waikato opposed her governmental involvement. She was able to acquire from the government a block of land near the meeting house for growing vegetables, increased pensions and a local post box. The Prime Minister Gordon Coates also gave her a 200-acre farm, built her a house and made a gift of £1,000 for farm development; and also subsidised a Māori workers' hostel in Tuakau. Coates said this was given in recognition of her work for Waikato orphans and the poor but also to consolidate her political support at a time when the Rātana church was becoming a major and threatening political force. Ngata gave Te Puea government loans and another 300-acre block to grow food to support the Kīngitanga. This farm needed a developer and an experienced Pākehā farmer paid for by the government was appointed supervisor. Ngata fired him and replaced him with Te Puea. She was given a car so she could move around the three farms. Her husband was given another farm at Tikitere in Rotorua. However concerns were raised in Parliament about how Ngata was operating and misusing government funds in 1934. This led to an investigation held by a Royal Commission that found there had been a host of irregularities involving the expenditure of £500,000. Labour MP Bob Semple said that the commission revealed one of the worst specimens of abuse of political power, maladministration and misappropriation of public funds. Ngata resigned.

In 1935, she was awarded the King George V Silver Jubilee Medal.

Te Puea was appointed a Commander of the Order of the British Empire, for social welfare services, in the 1937 Coronation Honours. Initially she was confused and reluctant to accept the award because of her dealings with the government. The CBE was awarded for her self-sacrificing devotion and stupendous personal efforts and extraordinary capacity for leadership and organisation, with a talent for diplomacy in her dealings with other tribes and leaders amongst the Pakeha... she turned idle lands into productive excellent farms. A year later another carved meeting house was opened by the Governor General, Lord Galway.

=== 1940s ===
In 1940 she bought a farm near Ngāruawāhia and began developing it provide an economic base for the Tūrangawaewae community. It was there that she began teaching the beliefs that would sustain the King Movement: work, faith (specifically the Pai Mārire faith, which became strongly established in the Waikato region), and pan-Māori unity through the King Movement. Te Puea always stressed the importance of iwi over hapū (the tribe over the sub-tribe or family grouping).

The Government planned nationwide celebrations for the centenary in 1940 of the signing of the Treaty of Waitangi, the document that founded modern New Zealand. Initially Te Puea was in favour, but then withdrew her support when the government refused her request that the Māori king be given the same tax status as the governor-general. At the time she said:

This is an occasion for rejoicing on the part of the Pākehā and those tribes which have not suffered any injustice during the past hundred years.

== Reconciliation with Pākehā ==
Te Puea was raised by people who had fought war to resist the government invasion of the Waikato in 1863, and by people who had lived through the bitter years that followed. She had little reason to love or trust Pākehā. However, as time went by she came to see the need for reconciliation. In 1946 Te Puea approached the government to say the tribe would be willing to accept money to compensate for the loss of lands after the defeat of the Kīngitanga in 1863. A large meeting was held at Tūrangawaewae in which a wide range of opinions were aired. Then the leadership met privately with Prime Minister Peter Fraser and worked out what would be accepted by the tribe. A deal had already been settled with Taranaki tribes and Waikato were keen to do better. The final deal gave Waikato nearly twice the income of Taranaki. The deal was accepted by Roore Edwards at the urging of Te Puea. After nearly 20 years of negotiation she accepted, on behalf of Tainui, a settlement offered by the Prime Minister of an initial grant of 10,000 pounds and 5,000 pounds (later $15,000) a year spread over 40 years. No provision was made for inflation which at that time was very low. By the time the deal was presented to the tribe the next day the money had been increased again to 6,000 pounds for 50 years and thereafter 5,000 pounds in perpetuity. She recognised this as an acceptable offer. However the payment acknowledged that a grievous wrong had been done to her people. Te Puea also built Tūrangawaewae marae and has a statue of her in front of the house called Mahinārangi.

== Later life ==
In the last few years of her life, Te Puea fell out with many of the Māori and Pākehā friends who had worked with her for most of her adult life. She became increasingly demanding and unreasonable when she did not get her way. Te Puea died at her home after a long illness. During her lifetime, she had raised the profile of the King Movement, especially outside of Waikato, and had helped raise the standard of living of Waikato to that of other Māori.

In December 1947, Te Puea became a member of a trust that administered a Māori land reserve in Māngere Bridge, Auckland. The land had been settled in the 19th century by her Ngāti Mahuta relatives, including Pōtatau Te Wherowhero, prior to his becoming the first Māori King, and Kati Takiwaru. Confiscated prior to the invasion of the Waikato, a section of the land was returned by the Native Land Court to Ngāti Mahuta individuals, including Te Puea's mother, Tiahuia, in 1890. Before her death, Te Puea expressed a wish for a marae to be built at the site, and in 1965 the Te Puea Memorial Marae was opened, named after her to acknowledge her contributions to the people of Aotearoa.

== Legacy ==
In 1998, Te Puea was posthumously inducted into the New Zealand Business Hall of Fame.

Composer Robert Wiremu wrote Te Kai a Te Rangatira which set to music speeches by Māori leaders including Te Puea Hērangi. Written for baritone and chamber ensemble it was commissioned for the IO Festival Kaitaia.

== Biography by Michael King ==
In 1974 the historian Michael King, who had worked for the Waikato Times and learnt te reo Māori, became interested in writing about Te Puea. He discovered there was very little written about her and wanted to write about her while the people who knew her at first hand, were still alive. King tried to persuade the Māori author Pei te Hurinui Jones, to write the biography but he refused, saying he knew too much about her. Jones said it would be difficult to write about Te Puea without damaging her reputation (mana). After discussions with the tribe and Dame Te Atairangikaahu it was agreed that King would write her biography. He was given restricted access to many of Te Puea's papers by Alex McKay, formerly Te Puea's secretary. McKay said he could not have all the papers as there was too much private and family information that should remain confidential. Many of Te Puea's elderly friends gave valuable time to King. Within a few years nearly all were dead. After the book was published some non-Waikato/Tainui Māori criticised them for allowing a Pākehā to write about a highly tapu person.

== Bibliography ==
- King, Michael (1977). Te Puea: A Biography. Auckland: Hodder and Stoughton. ISBN 0-340-22482-7.
