= Māori King movement =

Shared monarchy of numerous Māori iwi of New Zealand

Queen of the Kīngitanga
- Kuīni
- Crest and motto of the Kīngitanga

Incumbent
- Nga wai hono i te po since 5 September 2024
- Flag of the Kīngitanga

Details
- Style: Te Arikinui and then Te Kuīni
- Heir apparent: None; elective
- First monarch: Pōtatau Te Wherowhero
- Formed: 1858
- Residences: Tūrongo House, Tūrangawaewae
- Appointer: Iwi of the Kīngitanga

The Māori King movement, called the Kīngitanga (Note: Māori pronunciation: [ˈkiːŋitaŋa]. Alternatively spelled Kiingitanga, preferred by the Waikato-Tainui iwi.) in Māori, is a Māori movement that arose among some of the Māori iwi (tribes) of New Zealand in the central North Island in the 1850s, to establish a role similar in status to that of the monarchy of the United Kingdom as a way of halting the alienation of Māori land. The first Māori king, Pōtatau Te Wherowhero, was crowned in 1858. The monarchy is non-hereditary in principle, although every monarch since Pōtatau Te Wherowhero has been a child of the previous monarch. The eighth monarch is Nga wai hono i te po, who was elected and crowned in September 2024.

The Māori monarch operates in a non-constitutional capacity outside the New Zealand government, without explicit legal or judicial power. Reigning monarchs retain the position of paramount chief of several iwi, and wield some power over these, especially within Tainui. The influence of the Māori monarch is widespread in Māoridom despite the movement not being adhered to by several major iwi, notably Tūhoe, Ngāti Porou, and the largest of all, Ngāpuhi. The headquarters for the King movement is Tūrangawaewae Marae in the town of Ngāruawāhia.

The movement arose among a group of central North Island iwi in the 1850s as a means of attaining Māori unity to halt the alienation of land at a time of rapid population growth by European colonists. The movement sought to establish a monarch who could claim status similar to that of Queen Victoria and thus provide a way for Māori to deal with Pākehā (Europeans) on equal footing. It took on the appearance of an alternative government with its own flag, newspaper, bank, councillors, magistrates and law enforcement. It was viewed by the colonial government as a challenge to the supremacy of the monarchy of the United Kingdom, leading in turn to the 1863 invasion of the Waikato, which was partly motivated by a drive to neutralise the Kīngitanga's power and influence. Following their defeat at Ōrākau in 1864, the Kingites withdrew into the Ngāti Maniapoto tribal region of the North Island that became known as the King Country.

== History ==
=== Background ===
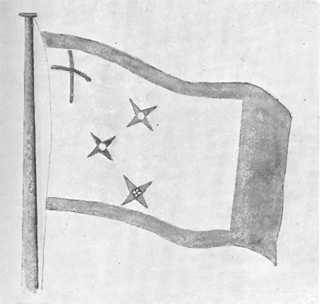
The flag hoisted at Ngāruawāhia on the proclamation of Pōtatau Te Wherowhero as Māori King, drawn in 1863

From the early 1850s, North Island Māori came under increasing pressure to satisfy the demand of European settler farmers for arable land. While Māori cultivated small areas, relying on extensive forests for berry, birds and roots, settlers expanded their production capacity by burning forest and fern and planting grass seed in the ashes. Some influential chiefs including Te Rauparaha opposed land sales in the 1840s (culminating in the 1843 Wairau Affray), and the view became more widespread in the following decade, when the Pākehā (European) population grew to outnumber Māori and the colonial government's Native Land Purchase Department adopted unscrupulous methods to take ownership, which included offers to chiefs or small groups of owners. Deals with individual Māori or groups that did not represent majority interests also dragged Māori into disputes with one another. As the white frontier encroached further on their land, many became concerned that their land, and race, would soon be overrun.

Around 1853 Māori revived the ancient tribal rūnanga or chiefly war councils where land issues were raised and in May 1854 a large meeting—attracting as many as 2000 Māori leaders—was held at Manawapou in south Taranaki where speakers urged concerted opposition to selling land. The meetings provided an important forum for Te Rauparaha's son, Christian convert Tāmihana Te Rauparaha, who in 1851 had visited England where he was presented to Queen Victoria. Tāmihana Te Rauparaha had returned to New Zealand with the idea of forming a Māori kingdom, with one king ruling over all iwi (tribes), and used the rūnanga to secure the agreement of influential North Island chiefs to his idea. The kotahitanga or unity movement was aimed at bringing to Māori the unity that was an obvious strength among the Europeans. It was believed that by having a monarch who could claim status similar to that of Queen Victoria, Māori would be able to deal with Pākehā on equal footing. It was also intended to establish a system of law and order in Māori communities to which the Auckland government had so far shown little interest.

=== Pōtatau Te Wherowhero ===
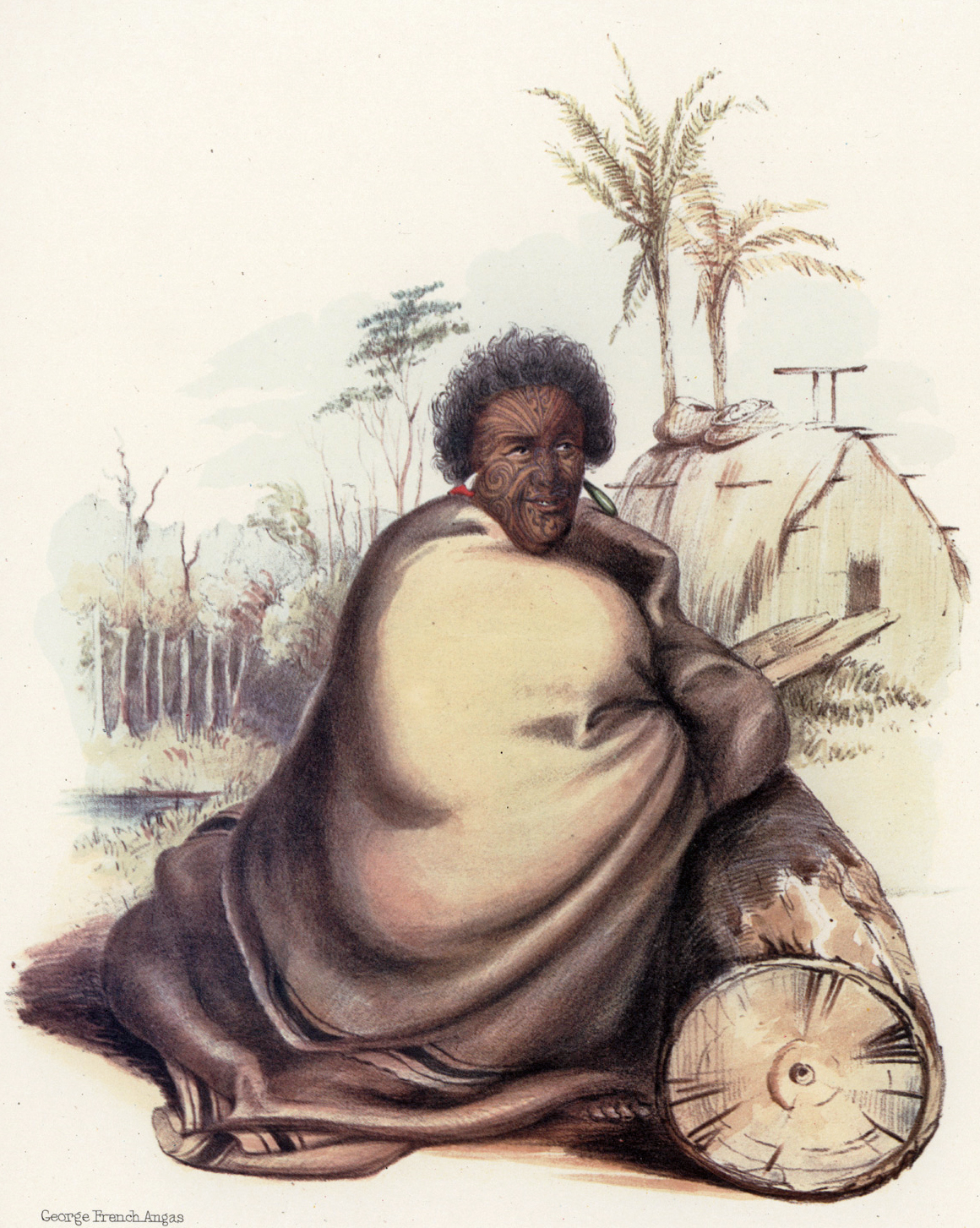
Pōtatau Te Wherowhero, the first Māori King

Several North Island candidates who were asked to put themselves forward declined; in February 1857, a few weeks after a key intertribal meeting in Taupō, Wiremu Tamihana, a chief of the Ngāti Hauā iwi in eastern Waikato, circulated a proposal to appoint as king the elderly and high-ranking Waikato chief Te Wherowhero, and a major meeting to deal with it was organised to be held at Rangiriri in April. (Note: Michael King's account in Te Puea (1977, p. 24) contains a slightly different chronology: He says the meeting at Pukawa beside Lake Taupō took place in November 1856 and it was there that chiefs agreed on Te Wherowhero. King says chiefs who were party to the Pukawa decision represented Ngāpuhi, Te Arawa, Ngāti Porou, Ngāti Kahungunu, Taranaki, Whanganui and Ngāi Tahu as well as the "first circle" of supporters, Waikato, Maniapoto and Hauraki. Te Wherowhero, then aged in his mid-80s, was a descendant of Hoturoa, captain of the Tainui canoe; he had connections with other iwi and came from a line of successful fighting chiefs. He had been an outstanding combatant himself in the days of tribal warfare, had become a friend of Governor Grey and regarded himself as a friend of the Pākehā. He was also well resourced: he was able to call on the assistance of 5000 immediate followers and his Waikato territory had a wealth of food in its rivers and lakes and vast areas of potato and wheat cultivations.)

After initially declining—he was unwilling to undertake new ventures at his age and was described by a European visitor as blind and decrepit, "on the very brink of his grave"—Te Wherowhero agreed in September 1857 to accept the kingship and in June 1858 he was crowned at Ngāruawāhia, later adopting the name Pōtatau Te Wherowhero or simply Pōtatau.

In his acceptance speech Pōtatau stressed the spirit of unity symbolised by the kingship and called on his people to "hold fast to love, to the law, and to faith in God." Over time the King movement came to have a flag, a council of state, a code of laws, a "King's Resident Magistrate", police, a surveyor and a newspaper, Te Hokioi, all of which gave the movement the appearance of an alternative government. The lives of his followers were given new purpose with the lawmaking, trials, and lengthy meetings and debates. Historian Michael King noted: "In the eyes of his supporters, the chiefs who had raised him up had made him a repository for their own mana and tapu and for that of their lands. Pōtatau was now a man of intensified prestige and sacredness. This belief was to impel people to go to heroic lengths to uphold the kingship and, subsequently, to fight for it."

Pōtatau proclaimed the boundary separating his authority from that of the Governor, saying: "Let Maungatautari be our boundary. Do not encroach on this side. Likewise I am not to set foot on that side." The King envisaged a conjoint administration in which he ruled in territory still under Māori customary title while the Governor ruled in areas acquired by the Crown.

Governor Thomas Gore Browne had been watching developments with concern. In June 1857 he wrote to London that "I apprehend no sort of danger from the present movement, but it is evident that the establishment of a separate nationality by the Māoris in any form or shape if persevered in would end sooner or later in collision." Though there were still no signs the movement was developing an aggressive spirit, Browne soon began expressing his fear that "it will resolve into a conflict of race and become the greatest political difficulty we have had to contend with".

Recognition of the new King, however, was not immediate: though there was widespread respect for the movement's efforts in establishing a "land league" to slow land sales, Pōtatau's role was strongly embraced only by Waikato Māori, with iwi of North Auckland and south of Waikato showing him scant recognition. Some opponents dismissed the Kīngitanga as a solely Waikato movement. Throughout 1859 emissaries of the King movement travelled through the North Island, including Taranaki, Whanganui and Hawkes Bay, seeking further adherents, with iwi sometimes divided in their support. Even within the movement there was said to be deep division: historian Keith Sinclair claimed "moderates" aligned themselves with Wiremu Tamihana, and "anti-European extremists" followed Ngāti Maniapoto chief and warlord Rewi Maniapoto, although Belich and historian Vincent O'Malley dispute this, saying both factions were driven by shared objectives and concerns and that divisions had been exaggerated by historians. Tribal rivalries may also have weakened unity. Historian B.J. Dalton observed: "Outside the Waikato, the King Movement appealed most to the younger generation who could see no other way of gaining the mana their fathers had won in battle."

On 10 April 1860, three weeks after the start of the Taranaki wars, deputations from west coast iwi Te Āti Awa and Ngā Ruanui attended a gathering of Waikato Māori at Ngāruawāhia and tendered their formal allegiance to the king. Discussions at that meeting, and at a second meeting at Peria six weeks later that attracted a large group of supporters from the lower Waikato, centered on hostilities in Taranaki and the question of whether the King movement should intervene. A faction of moderates within the movement swung the decision against direct involvement, but news of the meetings led to panic in Auckland over the possibility of a Māori attack on the capital, in turn prompting what Dalton described as "a mood of savage vindictiveness towards all Māori". In late June 1860 large numbers of Waikato Māori travelled to Taranaki to reinforce Te Āti Awa chief Wiremu Kīngi Te Rangitāke's forces and joined in the plunder of abandoned farms, but the intervention was unorganised and on a limited scale, relieving Taranaki settlers of some fear of full-scale Kingite involvement.

Pōtatau died of influenza on 25 June 1860 and was succeeded by his son Matutaera Tāwhiao.

=== Matutaera Tāwhiao ===
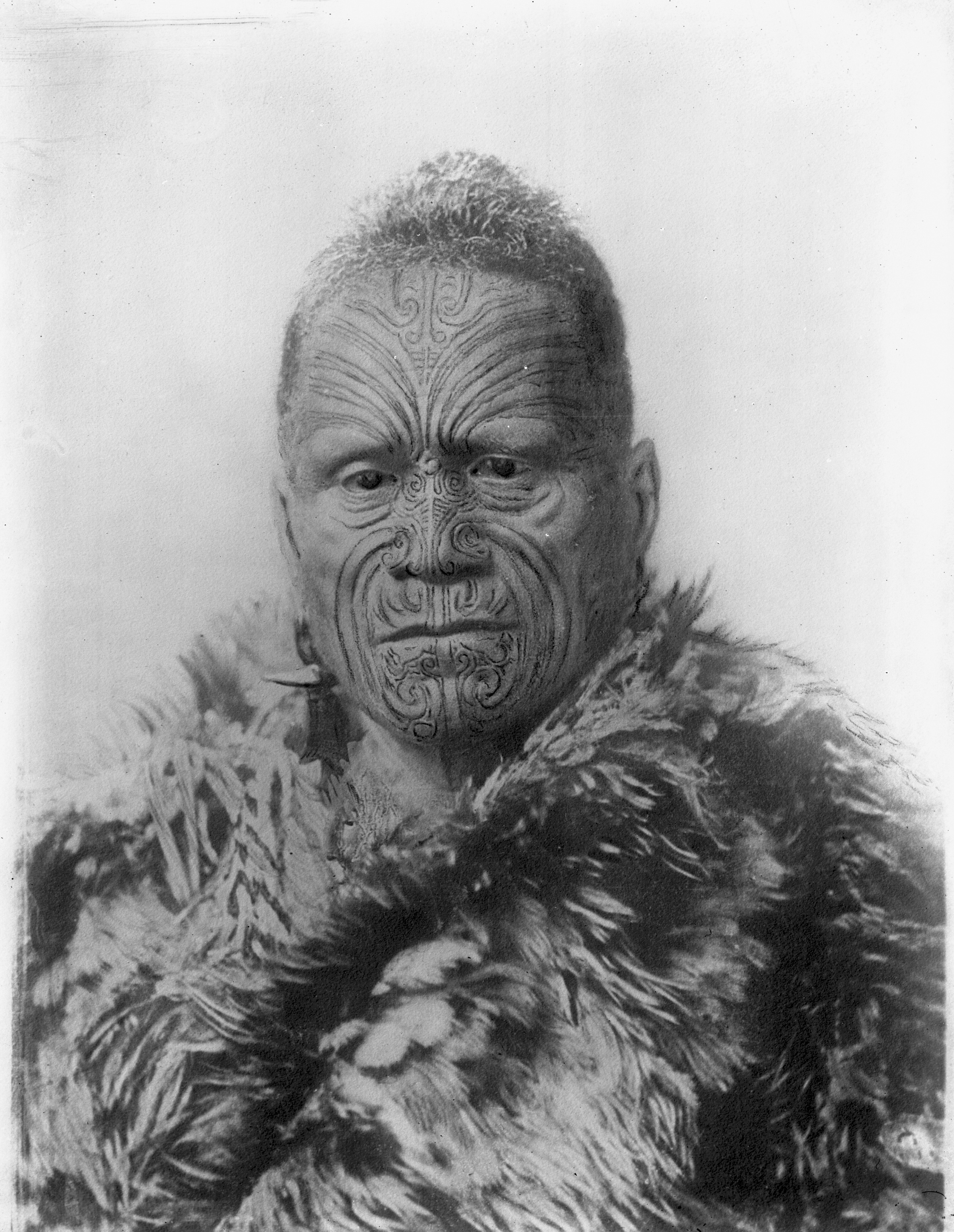
Tāwhiao, the second Māori king (1860–1894)

Tāwhiao's succession to the position of King coincided with a period of increasing friction between Māori and the Auckland-based settler government over issues of land ownership and sovereignty. Hostilities surrounding land purchases in Taranaki spread, erupting into a series of conflicts that became known as the New Zealand Wars.

Tamihana, a strategist revered as the "kingmaker", expressed the Kīngitanga movement's key concern in a letter to Browne at the close of the First Taranaki War in 1861. He said Waikato iwi had never signed the Treaty of Waitangi and that Māori were a separate nation. "I do not desire to cast the Queen from this island, but from own piece (of land). I am to be the person to overlook my own piece," he wrote. But Browne regarded the Kīngitanga stance as an act of disloyalty; his plans for the invasion of Waikato were fuelled in large part by his desire to uphold "the Queen's supremacy" in the face of the Kīngitanga challenge.

At a runanga of 100 people near Kawhia in May 1861, Hone Wetere and others expressed opposition to the Kīngitanga movement and the war in Taranaki. Browne's successor, Sir George Grey, told a large Māori gathering at Taupari near the mouth of the Waikato River in December 1861 that the King movement was bad and should be abandoned. On 9 July 1863 Grey issued an ultimatum that all Māori living between Auckland and the Waikato take an oath of allegiance to Queen Victoria or be expelled south of the Waikato River. Troops invaded Waikato territory three days later.

Kīngitanga forces were forced to fight a defensive war based on frustrating and slowing down their enemy but were unable to prevail over a full-time professional army with almost unlimited manpower and firepower.

Tāwhiao and his close followers fled into the bush and steep limestone valleys of Maniapoto territory, which was subsequently known as the King Country, declaring that Europeans risked death if they crossed the aukati or boundary of the confiscated land. Governor Grey, meanwhile, began steering through Parliament legislation for the widespread seizure of the land of "rebel" Māori. The confiscation of 486,500 hectares of land, including fertile areas under cultivation, burial sites and areas that had been inhabited for centuries, was a bitter blow for Waikato Māori. In 1869 and 1870 Tāwhiao was challenged by Ringatū prophet and guerrilla leader Te Kooti to resume hostilities against the government to try to wrest back the confiscated land. Tāwhiao, however, had renounced war and declared 1867–68 as the "year of the lamb" and "year of peace"; in April 1869 he had issued another proclamation that "the slaying of man by man is to cease". Though there were radical elements in the Kīngitanga movement who favoured a resumption of war, including Rewi Maniapoto and possibly Tāwhiao himself, moderates continued to warn the King that they had little chance of success and risked annihilation by becoming involved in Te Kooti's actions.

Tāwhiao remained in exile for 20 years, wandering through Maniapoto and Taranaki settlements, adopting an Old Testament view of himself as an anointed leader of a chosen people wandering in the wilderness awaiting a deliverance into their inheritance.

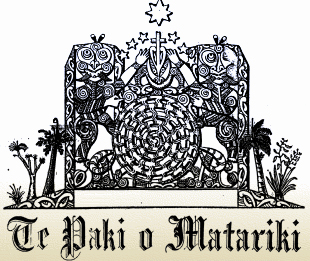
Masthead from Te Paki o Matariki, newspaper of the Kīngitanga, edition of 8 May 1893. It represents Matariki or the Pleiades as harbingers of good weather and fruitful endeavours.

From the 1870s the Government—keen to push a north–south railway link through the centre of the North Island and open up the King Country to more settlers—made approaches to Tāwhiao to offer peace terms. Grey, by now Premier of New Zealand, visited the King in May 1878 to offer him "lands on the left bank of the Waipā, 500 acres at Ngāruawāhia, land in all the townships" as well as economic aid and rights over roads and land dealings. Tāwhiao refused the offer. Three years later, in July 1881, he summoned Resident Magistrate William Gilbert Mair to a meeting at Alexandra (today known as Pirongia) where he and 70 followers laid down their guns, then laid alongside them 70 roasted pigeons and a fantail, explaining, "This means peace."

He travelled to London in 1884 with Western Maori MP Wiremu Te Wheoro to lead a deputation with a petition to the Crown about Māori land grievances but was refused an audience with the Queen. Back in New Zealand in 1886 and seeking Māori solutions to Māori problems through Māori institutions, he petitioned Native Minister John Ballance for the establishment of a Māori Council "for all the chiefs of this Island". When this proposal, too, was ignored, he set up his own Kauhanganui, a Kīngitanga parliament, at Maungakawa in 1892. Though all North Island iwi were invited to attend, participation was confined mainly to the Waikato, Maniapoto and Hauraki people who were already part of the King movement. The assembly's discussions included proceedings in the national Parliament, interpretations of the Treaty of Waitangi, the confiscation issue and conditions for land sales, but its deliberations and recommendations were either ignored or derided by the Parliament and public servants. The establishment of Tāwhiao's Kauhanganui coincided with the formation of a Māori Parliament at Waipatu Marae in Heretaunga. This parliament, which consisted of 96 members from the North and South Islands under Prime Minister Hāmiora Mangakāhia, was formed as part of the Kotahitanga (unification) movement, which Tāwhiao refused to join.

From about 1886 until about 1905 it also had a bank, the Bank of Aotearoa, which operated in Parawera, Maungatautari and Maungakawa.

Tāwhiao also instituted a system of annual poukai—visits by the King to Kīngitanga marae, which he devised as a means of drawing people back to their marae on a fixed day each year. The poukai later evolved into regular consultation meetings between Kīngitanga leadership and its followers where funds were also raised to cover the movement's expenses and the upkeep of local marae.

Tāwhiao died suddenly on 26 August 1894 and was succeeded by his oldest son, Mahuta Tāwhiao.

=== Mahuta Tāwhiao ===
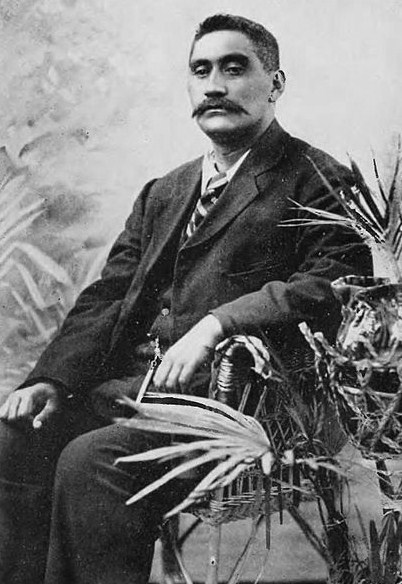
Mahuta Tāwhiao, third Māori king, who was crowned in 1894.

Mahuta, born about 1854, was raised during the wars of the 1860s and the exile that followed, and received no European education and spoke little English. By the time of his coronation support for the King movement had declined and its followers were limited mainly to the Tainui iwi in Waikato and Ngāti Maniapoto from the King Country.

From the beginning of his kingship Mahuta took an interest in politics: he pressed the government for compensation for the 1860s land confiscations, sponsored a relative, Henare Kaihau, for the Western Maori electorate and from the late 1890s made frequent contact with Prime Minister Richard Seddon and Native Affairs Minister James Carroll, the first Māori to hold a cabinet position. Mahuta was an advocate of conciliation between Māori and Pākehā; according to historian Michael King, Seddon took advantage of his goodwill and naivety to secure the sale of more Māori land. Seddon invited Mahuta to Wellington as a member of the Legislative Council (Upper House) and to sit on the Executive Council as "Minister representing the Maori race". Despite widespread opposition from Waikato Māori, who feared it was an attempt to neutralise the King movement, Mahuta accepted and he was sworn in in May 1903. He entrusted the kingship to his younger brother Te Wherowhero Tawhiao, but resumed the kingship on 21 May 1910, disillusioned with the political process in dealing with Māori confiscation claims.

Throughout Mahuta's years as king, Waikato was mired in economic and social depression. Many Māori were landless and destitute because of confiscations, while those who did still own land were unable to make it productive. The area had severe health problems, with constant bouts of typhoid epidemics, influenza, measles and whooping cough. Sanitary conditions were generally poor, unemployment high, drunkenness widespread and child schooling rates very low.

In 1911 Mahuta withdrew his backing for Kaihau in Western Maori after discovering he had presided over the loss of £50,000 of Kīngitanga moneys and used his niece, Te Puea Hērangi, to swing support to doctor and former Health Department medical officer Māui Pōmare in that year's general election. Pōmare won the seat by 565 votes. Te Puea's involvement in campaigning for Mahuta's preferred candidate marked her elevation to a position of chief organiser for the King movement, a role she held until her death in 1952.

Mahuta's health declined throughout 1912 and he died on 9 November, aged 57.

=== Te Rata Mahuta (1912–1933) ===
Mahuta's eldest son Te Rata, then aged between 30 and 33, was crowned on 24 November 1912 by kingmaker Tupu Taingakawa. He was shy and physically weak, having long suffered rheumatism, arthritis and heart disease. With strong support from his cousin and protector Te Puea (later widely referred to as "Princess Te Puea"), he withstood a challenge to his authority by Taingakawa, who established a rival kauhanganui (assembly) at Rukumoana, near Morrinsville. Te Puea built up facilities at the Mangatāwhiri pā and revived the recitation of tribal history, the singing of Waikato songs and other cultural traditions.

In 1913 Taingakawa convinced Te Rata to head another delegation to England to petition the Crown to revoke the land confiscations as a breach of the Treaty of Waitangi. An intertribal meeting at Raglan decided all King movement adherents would contribute a shilling a head to cover the cost and the four-man delegation sailed from Auckland on 11 April 1914. After initially being rebuffed, they gained an audience with King George V and Queen Mary on 4 June on condition that nothing embarrassing would be raised. They departed England on 10 August, having gained nothing but the assurance their claims would be referred back to the New Zealand Government.

With New Zealand already involved in World War I on Te Rata's return, the King discouraged Waikato enlistment—both because of Tāwhiao's 1881 declaration that Waikato Māori would never again fight and continued resentment over the injustice of confiscation. Te Puea explained: "They tell us to fight for king and country. We've got a King, but we haven't got a country. That's been taken off us." The war was viewed as a Pākehā fight among Pākehā nations. From June 1917 the Military Services Act was amended to apply conscription to all Māori, though the Minister of Defence advised officials it was to apply only to Waikato Māori. On 11 July 1918 police arrived at Te Paina, the King movement's pā at Mangatāwhiri, and began arresting males who had failed to report for military duty. The men were transported to Narrow Neck army training camp in Auckland, where they were repeatedly punished for refusing to dress in military uniform. At the end of the war 111 remained in confinement; they were released in May 1919. The anti-conscription stance led to the Kīngitanga movement being widely regarded by Pākehā as seditious traitors and German sympathisers and also drove a wedge between Te Puea and Pōmare, who throughout the war urged all Māori to fight for empire forces.

Te Puea continued to strengthen her position as an organiser and spiritual leader. She pioneered efforts to care for victims of the 1918 influenza epidemic, helped Waikato Māori turn previously unused land into farms and developed the movement's new spiritual and cultural home, the Tūrangawaewae marae at Ngāruawāhia. The first hui was held there on 25 December 1921.

Te Rata died on 1 October 1933. Te Puea rejected a proposal to make her the Māori monarch, believing that 21-year-old Korokī, Te Rata's eldest son, was the rightful heir to the throne.

=== Korokī Mahuta (1933–1966) ===
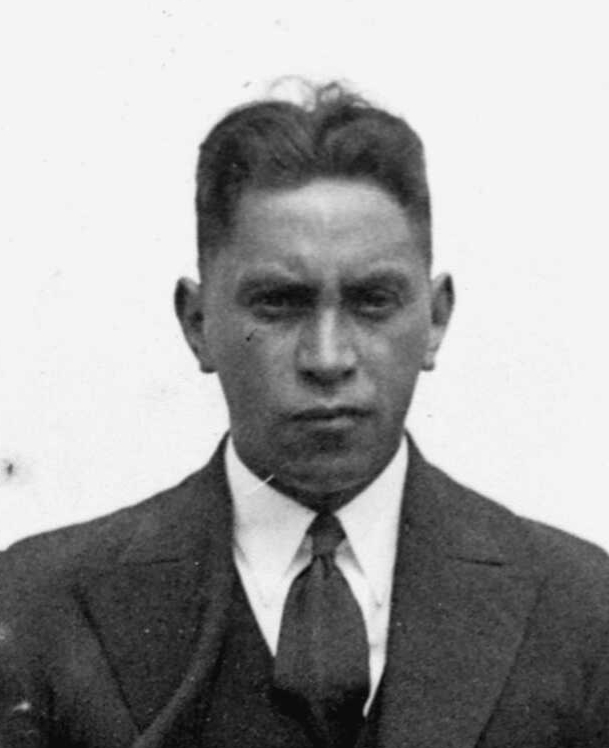
Korokī Mahuta, the fifth Māori king

Korokī Te Rata Mahuta Tāwhiao Pōtatau Te Wherowhero was the fifth in the line of Māori kings. Shy and reserved, he was crowned on 8 October 1933 at the age of about 25 and accepted the role reluctantly, protesting that with so many Waikato Māori living in poverty they could not afford a king. Throughout his reign he came under the strong but conflicting influence of several opposing factions which created some controversies; he also notably lost a battle with politicians to keep King Country free of liquor licences. He hosted a brief visit by Queen Elizabeth II to Tūrangawaewae on 30 December 1953; the government refused him permission to deliver a speech in which he was to make the historic step of declaring loyalty to the British Crown, but a copy of the speech was later sent to the Queen. From the late 1950s his health began to deteriorate and he died at Ngāruawāhia on 18 May 1966.

=== Te Atairangikaahu (1966–2006) ===
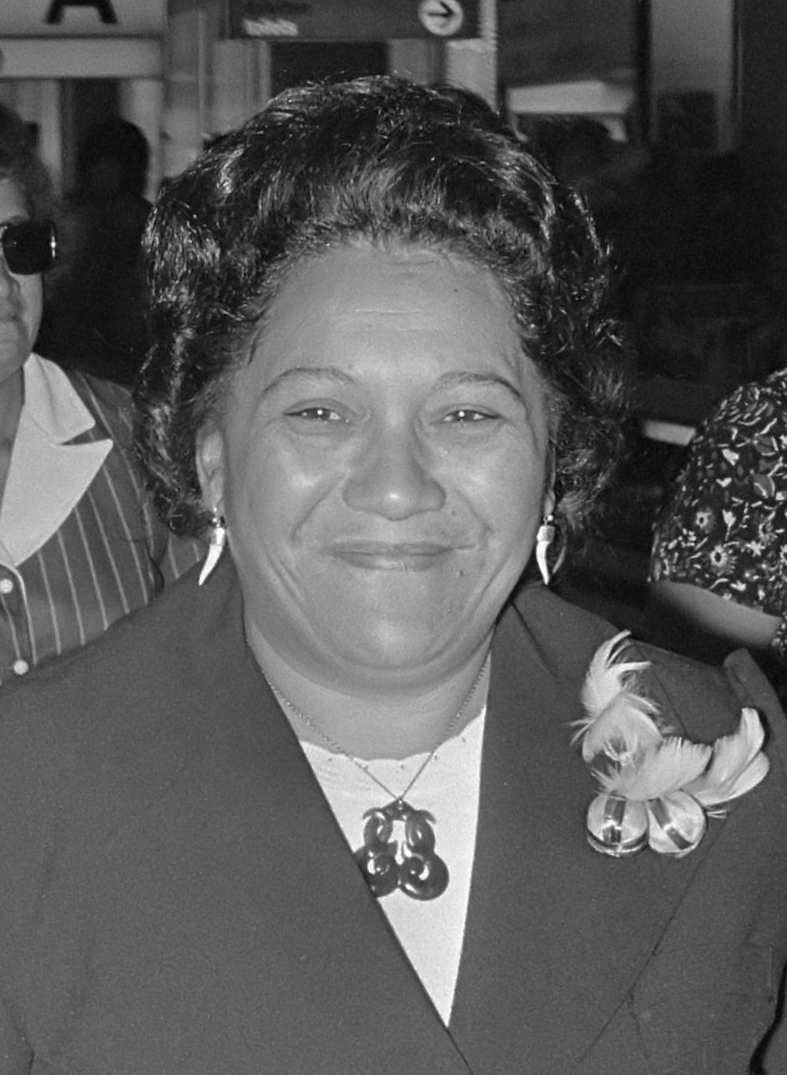
Te Atairangikaahu in 1975

Te Atairangikaahu, daughter of Māori King Korokī Mahuta, was elected as the first Māori Queen on 23 May 1966 and served until her death on 15 August 2006. In the New Year Honours 1970 Te Atairangikaahu was the first Māori to be appointed a Dame Commander of the Order of the British Empire for "...outstanding services to Māori people...". Her 40-year reign was the longest of any Māori monarch.

=== Tūheitia (2006–2024) ===
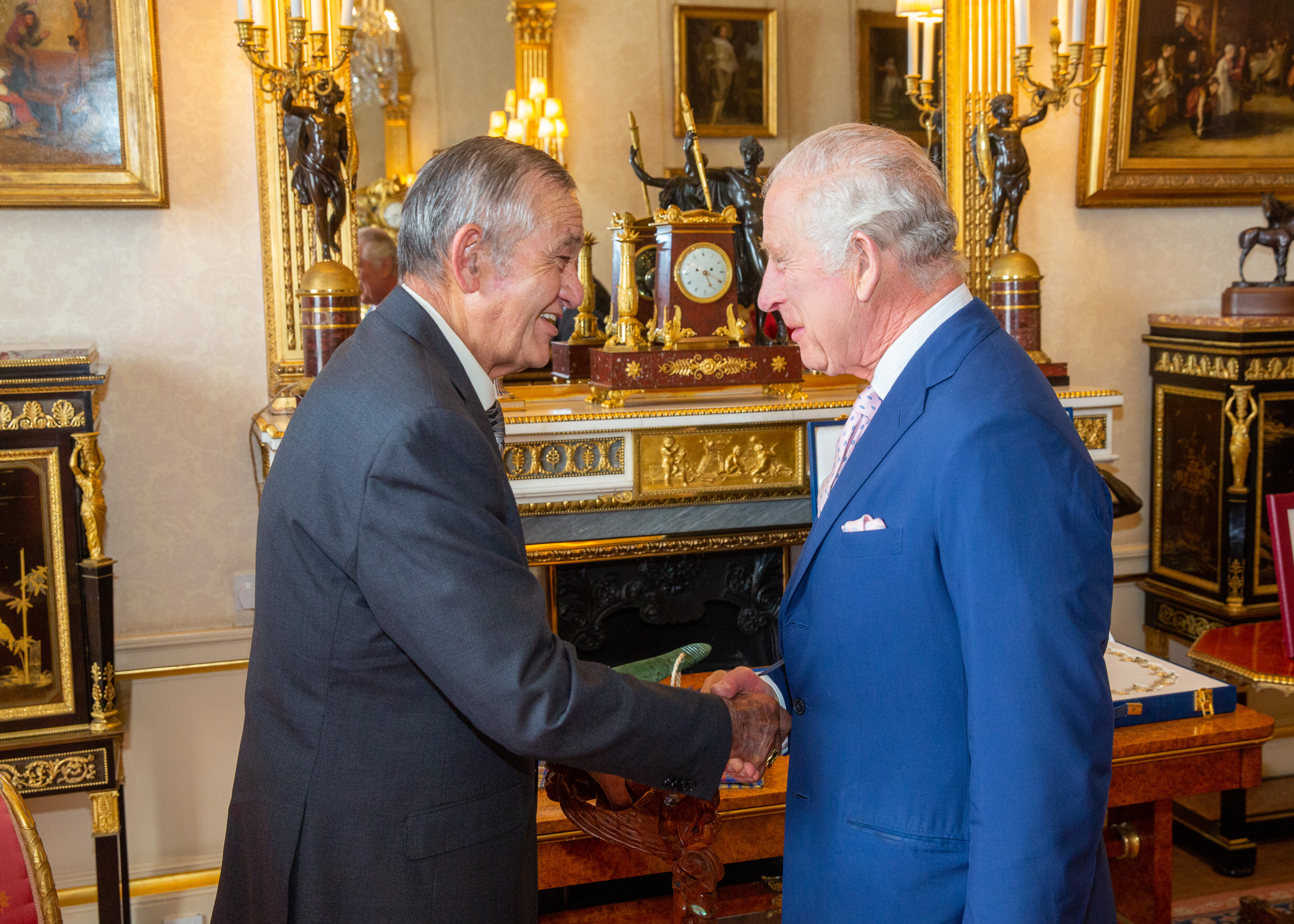
Tūheitia with Charles III, King of New Zealand in 2023

Following the death of his mother, Dame Te Atairangikaahu, Tūheitia was sworn in as the Māori king on 21 August 2006. In August 2014, Tūheitia created a Māori Honours System. There are three awards: the Order of King Pootatau Te Wherowhero; the Order of the Taniwhaa; and the Illustrious Order of Te Arikinui Queen Te Atairangikaahu.

On 30 August 2024, just over a week after his eighteenth koroneihana, Tūheitia died while recovering from heart surgery. He was 69.

=== Nga wai hono i te po (2024–present) ===
King Tuheitia's daughter and youngest child, Nga wai hono i te po, was announced by the Tekau-ma-Rua as the next monarch on 5 September 2024, the last day of his tangi. She is the second queen of the Kīngitanga, after her grandmother Te Arikinui Dame Te Atairangikaahu.

== Succession ==
The monarch is appointed by the leaders of the iwi involved in the Kīngitanga movement on the day of the previous monarch's funeral and before the burial.

In principle the position of Māori monarch is not hereditary. Thus far however, the monarchy has been hereditary in effect, as every new Māori monarch has been the child of the previous monarch, descending in seven generations from Pōtatau Te Wherowhero to the present Māori queen. With each successive monarch, the role of Pōtatau's family has been entrenched, although after any reign ends there is the potential for the mantle to be passed to someone from another whanau or iwi if the chiefs of the various iwi are in agreement. (Note: An analogous situation is the position of Holy Roman Emperor, which was technically elective but which passed along the line of the House of Habsburg for more than three and a half centuries, though with two exceptions: Charles VII (House of Wittelsbach) and Francis I (House of Lorraine).)

== Powers ==
The Kīngitanga has been a parliamentary elective monarchy since 1890. Power is divided between the Kauhanganui, the Kīngitanga and Waikato Tainui parliament, and the standing Māori monarch. The position of the Māori king is mainly a highly respected ceremonial role within the Waikato Tainui iwi with limited powers. Nevertheless, the standing monarch is entitled to appoint one of the 11 members on the Te Arataura, the executive board of the Kauhanganui.

Although the monarchs of the Kīngitanga are not recognised by New Zealand law or by many Māori iwi, they hold the distinction of being paramount chiefs of a number of important Māori iwi and wield some power on a local level, especially within the Tainui iwi.

The use of the title of "Māori King" has been challenged by various Māori leaders, namely by those of the north. In his discourse, David Rankin, a leader of the Ngāpuhi iwi of Northland, explains that the monarch is not the king of all Māori. The argument states that by the kīngitanga claiming ownership of such a title, the rangatiratanga and mana of iwi not associated (or strongly associated) with the movement is thereby diminished, infringing therefore upon their identity and autonomy as Māori and iwi.

== Practices ==
A coronation celebration, the Koroneihana, is held annually at Tūrangawaewae marae at Ngāruawāhia. A Bible is traditionally used during the crowning of a monarch.

The poukai is an annual circuit of visits by the Māori monarch to marae that support the King movement. The tradition was started in the 1880s by Tāwhiao, the second Māori king. The gatherings include feasting and cultural performances.

== Honours system ==
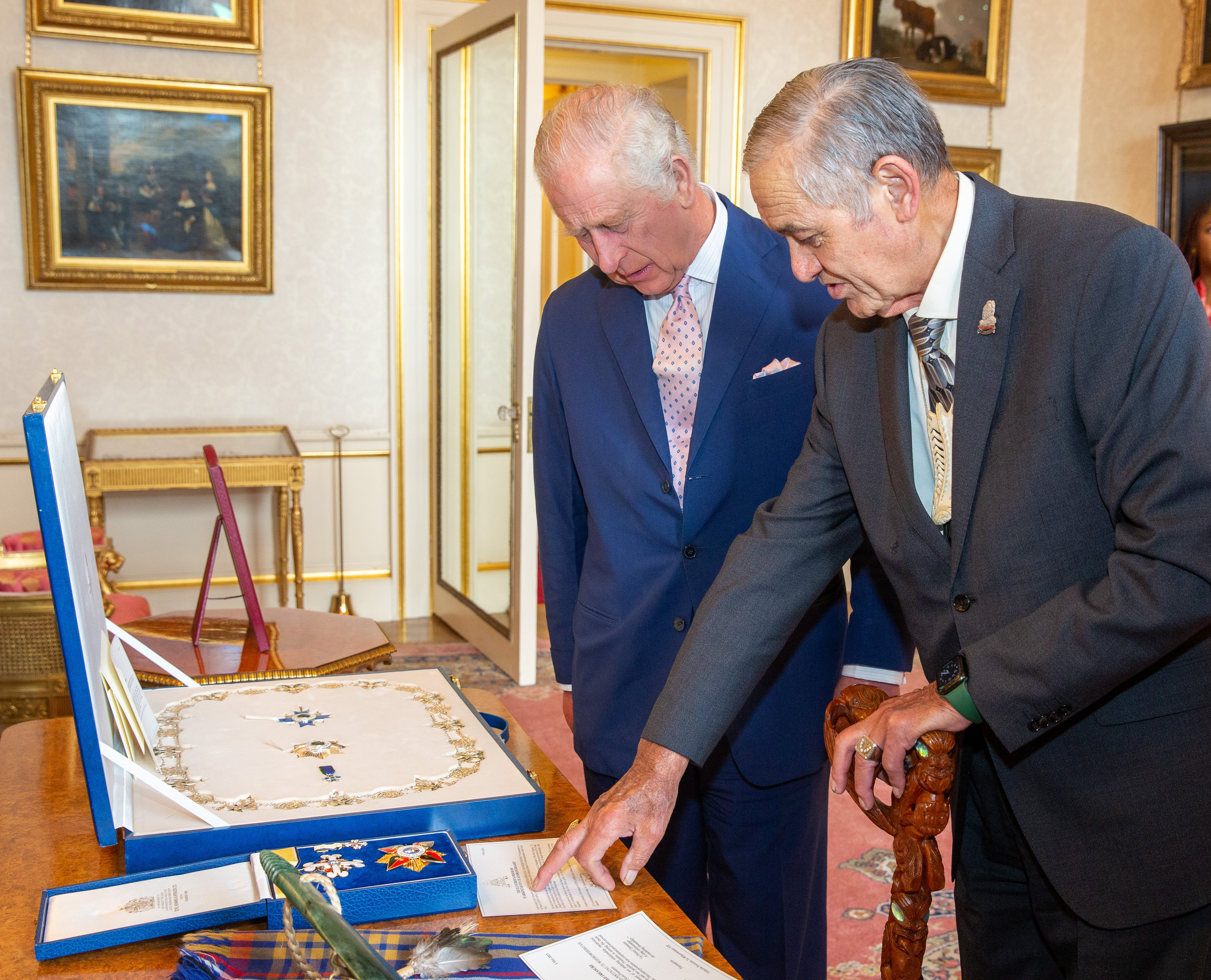
Tūheitia presents Charles III the collar and badge of the Order of King Pōtatau Te Wherowhero

In 2014, King Tūheitia Pōtatau Te Wherowhero VII and the Māori King movement established an independent honours system outside the New Zealand and Commonwealth governments to recognize those individuals who have been strong supporters of Māori and Māori issues.

Speaking at the closing of the annual Koroneihana on 21 August 2014, Kīngi Tuheitia acknowledged that while honours were not typically the Māori way, they were necessary to celebrate the efforts of Māori allies and to put the achievements of Māori individuals on equal standing as other sovereign states.

Three separate orders were created, each with a badge repeating the motto seen on the Kīngitanga coat of arms, Ko te mana motuhake, meaning "The self-determination and control over one’s own destiny". The senior-most honour, The Order of King Pootatau Te Wherowhero, also confers a collar upon investiture.

Tuheitia recognized Ihakara Porutu "Kara" Puketapu and Koro Tainui Wētere, both longtime New Zealand public servants and Māori community leaders as the founding members of the Order of the Taniwha. Dr Puketapu had previously turned down other National and Commonwealth honors, but lent his name to be invested in the Kīngitanga order. Named for the mythical beings that serve as guardians of the people, the award is meant to be an order of merit dedicated to individuals who have also served as guardians of the Māori people and heritage.

Hawaiian Princess Abigail Kawānanakoa and Taini Puahaere Rutene were named as the first recipients of The Illustrious Order of Te Arikinui Queen Te Atairangikaahu in the first and third grades of the order respectively. The award was named for Tūheitia's mother, Te Atairangikaahu, the first Māori Queen and first Māori to be made a Dame Commander of the Order of the British Empire. In 2023, Tūheitia recognized Queen Camilla as a first grade member of the order, suggesting that this award is dedicated to female individuals regardless of ethnic origin for their support of indigenous culture and heritage, similar to the Japanese Order of the Precious Crown.

Stated to be a dynastic order reserved exclusively for foreign heads of state, as King of the United Kingdom and Head of the Commonwealth, Charles III became the first recipient and founding member of The Order of King Pootatau Te Wherowhero in 2023. In doing so, Charles returned the favour Queen Te Atairangikaahu did in validating the Order of New Zealand as its founding member, and in effect legitimatizes the honour as one given by a monarch to another, much as that of stranger members of the Order of the Garter. The award is named for the first Māori King and Tūheitia's 6x grandfather, whose name he and every other Kīngi has adopted as their regnal name.

In 2015, Native Hawaiian Ivan Lui-Kwan, who serves as honorary Kīngitanga Ambassador to the United States and Hawaii was invested in the Order of the Taniwha (first class), and Nita Gregory, longtime aide to Queen Te Atairangikaahu, was honoured as a member of The Illustrious Order of Te Arikinui Queen Te Atairangikaahu (third class).

=== Kīngitanga Orders ===
Name	Insignia	Established	Founder	Current Sovereign	Awarded to/for	Motto	Refs
Order of King Pōtatau Te Wherowhero (Tohu Hōnore o te Kīngi Pōtatau Te Wherowhero)		21 August 2014	Tūheitia	Nga wai hono i te po	A dynastic order reserved for foreign heads of state who have rendered special service to the Kīngitanga. (Note: Has only been conferred in the supreme grade with collar, badge, and breast star. Decorations of additional grades currently unknown.)	Ko te mana motuhake ("The self-determination and control over one’s own destiny")	
Illustrious Order of Te Arikinui Queen Te Atairangikaahu (Tohu Hōnore Hira o Te Arikinui Te Atairangikaahu)		21 August 2014	Tūheitia	Nga wai hono i te po	Recognizes female individuals for their support of indigenous culture and heritage. (Note: Has been conferred in the first and third grade. The first grade confers a badge suspended from a yellow ribbon, and a breast star.)	Ko te mana motuhake ("The self-determination and control over one’s own destiny")	
Order of the Taniwha (Tohu Hōnore o te Taniwha)		21 August 2014	Tūheitia	Nga wai hono i te po	An order of chivalry honouring individuals who have served as guardians of the Māori people. (Note: Has only been conferred in the first grade. The first grade confers a badge suspended from a blue ribbon.)	Ko te mana motuhake ("The self-determination and control over one’s own destiny")	

== List of Māori monarchs ==
No.	Portrait	Regnal name	Reign		Birth name	Spouse(s)	House
No.	Portrait	Regnal name	Start	End	Birth name	Spouse(s)	House
1		Pōtatau Te Wherowhero died 1860	June 1858	25 June 1860	Te Wherowhero	Whakaawi, Waiata, Raharaha, Ngāwaero	Te Wherowhero
2		Tūkaroto Matutaera Pōtatau Te Wherowhero Tāwhiao c. 1822–1894	25 June 1860	26 August 1894	Tūkaroto Pōtatau Te Wherowhero	Hera Ngāpora, Rangiaho Taimana, Aotea Te Paratene	Te Wherowhero
3		Mahuta Tāwhiao Pōtatau Te Wherowhero c. 1854/55–1912	26 August 1894	9 November 1912	Whatiwhatihoe	Te Marae	Te Wherowhero
4		Te Rata Mahuta Tāwhiao Pōtatau Te Wherowhero c. 1878–1933	24 November 1912	1 October 1933	Te Rata Mahuta	Te Uranga	Te Wherowhero
5		Korokī Te Rata Mahuta Tāwhiao Pōtatau Te Wherowhero; 1906–1966	8 October 1933	18 May 1966	Korokī Te Rata Mahuta Tāwhiao Pōtatau Te Wherowhero	Te Atairangikaahu Hērangi	Te Wherowhero
6		Te Atairangikaahu; 1931–2006	23 May 1966	15 August 2006	Pikimene Korokī Mahuta	Whatumoana Paki	Te Wherowhero
7		Tūheitia Pōtatau Te Wherowhero; 1955–2024	21 August 2006	30 August 2024	Tūheitia Paki	Te Atawhai	Te Wherowhero
8		Nga wai hono i te po Pōtatau Te Wherowhero; 1997–present	5 September 2024	present	Nga wai hono i te po Paki		Te Wherowhero

== Symbols ==
=== Coat of arms ===
Coat of arms of the Kīngitanga – Te Paki-o-Matariki
Notes The coat of arms of the Kīngitanga was designed by Tīwai Parāone of Hauraki and Te Aokatoa of Waikato and Ngāti Raukawa during the reign of King Tāwhiao, and has been given the name Te Paki-o-Matariki meaning "the fine weather of Matariki". Crest A figure, Manawa ("the pulsating heart"), holding its tongue with both hands, and with a cross on its head. Above Manawa are seven stars representing Matariki (the Pleiades). Escutcheon The shield is a double spiral, Kōpū, representing the creation of the world with the strokes between the double lines marking various stages of creation. Supporters On the dexter side is Aituā, who looks after the dead and is the personification of misfortune, and on the sinister side is Te Atuatanga, who represents the good and is the personification of spirituality. Together they symbolise the balance of life. Compartment On the dexter side are a mamaku and a para (orchid tuber), representing traditional Māori foods, and on the sinister side are a nīkau palm and harakeke flax, representing housing and clothing. Motto Ko te Mana Motuhake ("spiritual prestige set apart")

=== Flags ===
A flag used by the Kīngitanga during the reign of Tūheitia

Each successive Māori monarch has had their own flag, with the personal flag of the current monarch also acting as the flag of the Kīngitanga movement. A new flag is made for each monarch and is interred with them when they die. Each new flag is considered to be tapu and is kept by a hereditary custodian.

The flag is flown at the monarch's official residence at Tūrangawaewae, and precedes them when they visit marae which recognise the Kīngitanga's authority.

=== Tartan ===
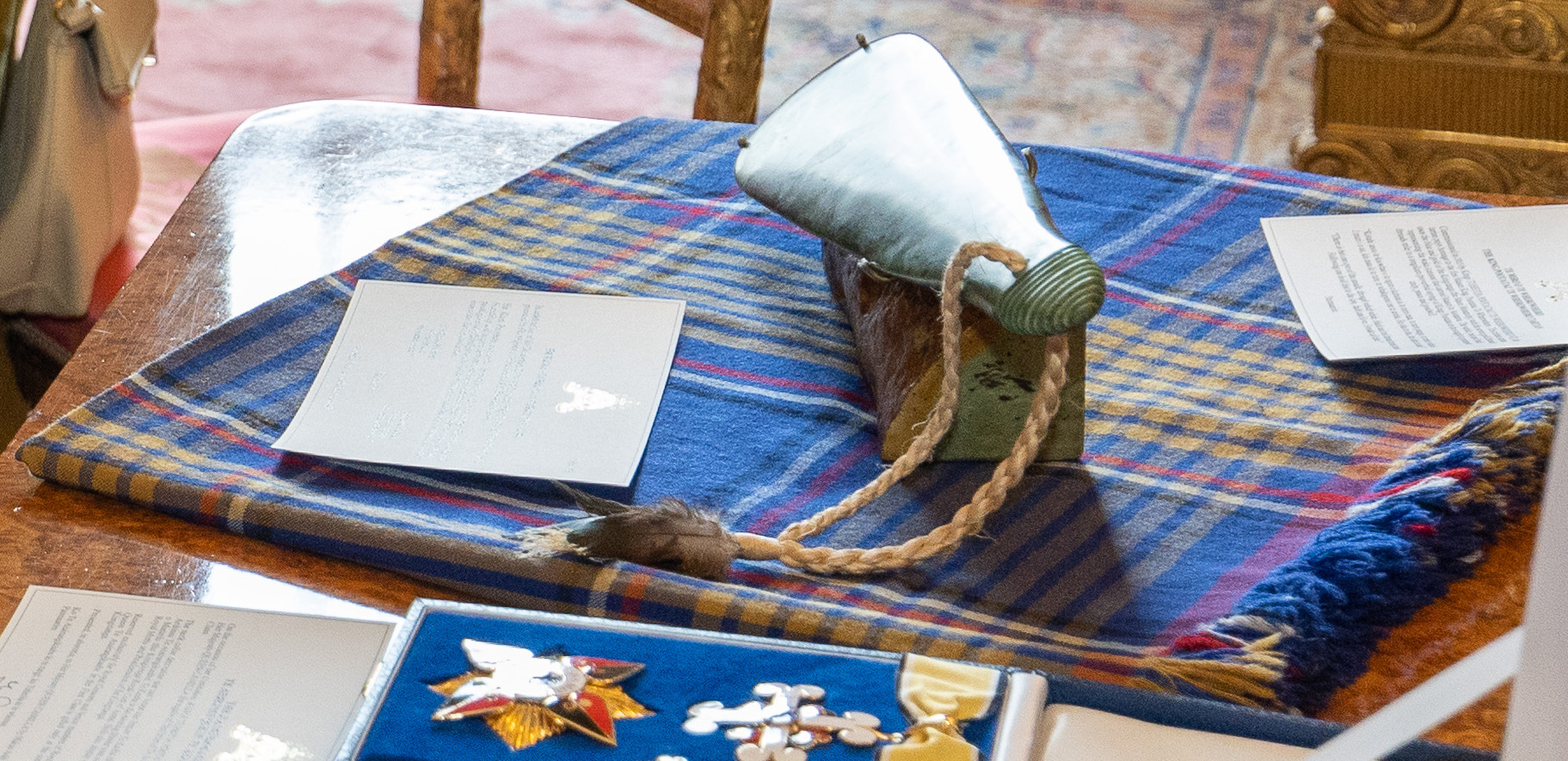
A "King Pootatau Te Wherowhero" tartan blanket presented by Tūheitia to Charles III prior to his coronation.

The Kīngitanga has its own tartan which was registered with the Scottish Register of Tartans on 16 September 2015: the "King Pootatau Te Wherowhero" tartan, which was designed in homage to Pōtatau Te Wherowhero. The tartan is blue with gold stripes representing the seven waka (blue and gold also being the Kīngitanga colours), and red, white and black threads representing a quote attributed to Pōtatau: “Kotahi te kōhao o te ngira e kuhuna ai te miro mā, te miro pango, te miro whero" ("There is but one eye of the needle, through which the white, red and black threads must pass.”)

The Kīngitanga is also associated with the Clan Mackay tartan, having adopted it after the marriage of Pōtatau's daughter Irihapeti to John Horton MacKay of Strathnaver, Scotland.

== See also ==
- Invasion of the Waikato
- New Zealand land confiscations
- Pei te Hurinui Jones
- Te Whakakitenga (the Kīngitanga's parliament)

== Bibliography ==
- Walker, Ranginui (1990). Ka Whawhai Tonu Matou: Struggle Without End. Auckland: Penguin. ISBN 0-14-013240-6.
