= Mahuta Tāwhiao =

Third Māori king

- Te Kiingi Maaori
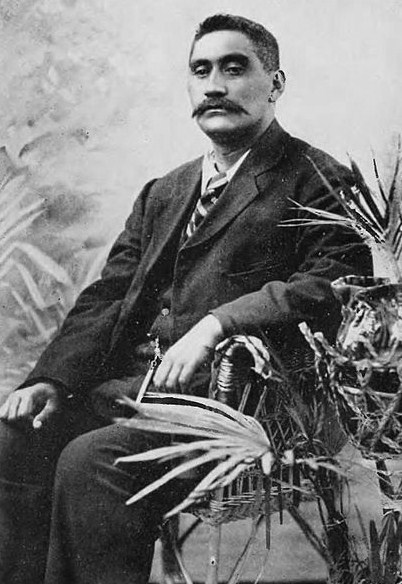

Māori King
- Reign: 26 August 1894 – 9 November 1912
- Coronation: 14 September 1894
- Predecessor: Matutaera Tāwhiao
- Successor: Te Rata
- Whirinaki-a-te-Kiingi (1903-1910): Te Wherowhero Tawhiao (younger brother)
- Born: circa 1854–55; Waikato, New Zealand
- Died: 9 November 1912 (aged 56–57); Waahi, Huntly, Waikato, New Zealand
- Burial: Mount Taupiri
- Spouse: Te Marae
- Issue: Te Rata; Tumate Mahuta; Tonga Mahuta
Regnal name
- Mahuta Tawhiao Potatau Te wherowhero
Posthumous name
- Mahuta Potatau Te Wherowhero III
- Kāhui Ariki: Te Wherowhero
- Father: Tāwhiao
- Mother: Hera Ngapora

Mahuta Tāwhiao I (c. 1855 – 9 November 1912) was the third Māori King, reigning from 1894 to 1912, and member of the New Zealand Legislative Council from 1903 to 1910.

== Early life ==
Born Whatiwhatihoe in the Waikato, probably in 1854 or 1855, Mahuta was the eldest son of King Tāwhiao and his first wife Hera. Mahuta had many half-brothers and -sisters from his father's other marriages and connections. During his childhood in the 1860s, New Zealand was embroiled in war and in his adolescence his family took refuge in the isolated King Country, so Mahuta received very little European education, spoke little English and was very much a traditionalist.

During his twenties, Mahuta married Te Marae, a daughter of Amukete (Amuketi) Te Kerei, a chief who was killed at the Battle of Rangiriri in 1863. They had five sons: Te Rata (who succeeded Mahuta as king), Taipu, Tumate, Tonga and Te Rauangaanga.

== Reign as king ==
When his father died in August 1894, Mahuta was made Māori King, taking the throne on 15 September of that year.

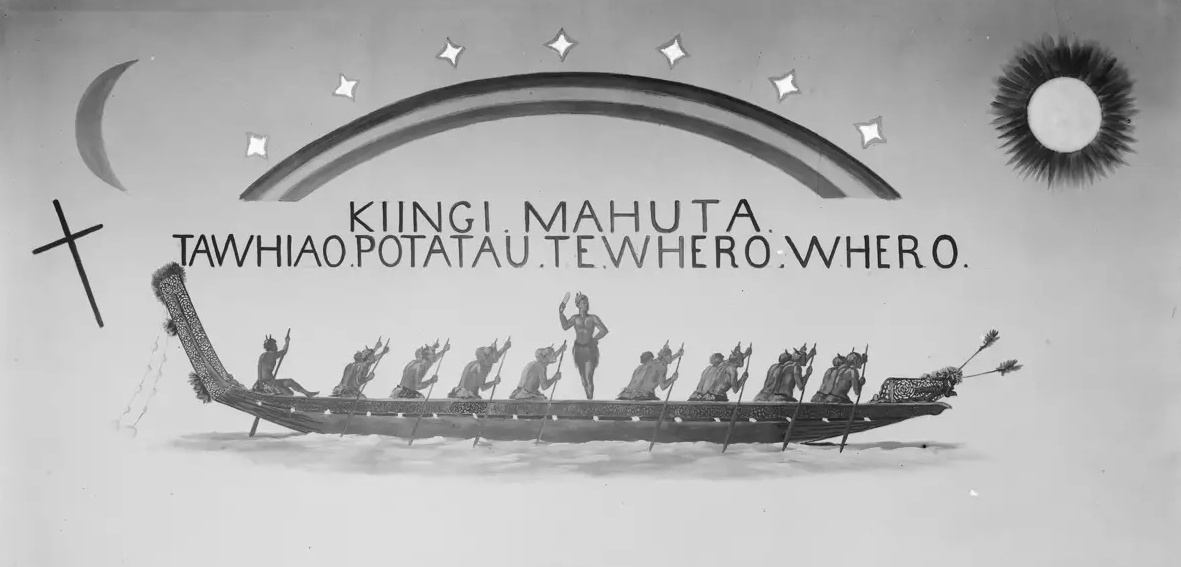
Personal standard of Mahuta Tāwhiao

Under Mahuta's rule, the King Movement's first courts were created, with judges, clerks and registrars. However, his nation weakened greatly by the turn of the century. The Māori people had very little land, and population crises and poverty ravaged them. Through a series of deals with colonial authorities, including joining the Legislative Council, Mahuta regained a little influence for his people, though the last years of his life were fraught with personal troubles.

He was a member of the New Zealand Legislative Council from 22 May 1903 to 21 May 1910, when his term ended. He was appointed by the Liberal Government, and was a Minister without Portfolio and a Member of the Executive Council from 22 June 1903 to 21 June 1906 in the Seddon Ministry and 21 June 1906 to 6 August 1906 in the interim Hall-Jones Ministry. During his time on the Legislative Council, Mahuta delegated the kingship to his younger brother Te Wherowhero Tawhiao.

He died at Waahi on 9 November 1912 and was buried on Taupiri Mountain.

Māori royalty
Preceded by Tāwhiao	Māori King; 1894–1912	Succeeded by Te Rata
