= Rereahu =

- Iwi (tribe) in Māoridom
- Location of traditional rohe
- Rohe (region): Waitomo District (Maniaiti / Benneydale, Pureora, and Maraeroa)
- Waka (canoe): Tainui

Rereahu was a Māori rangatira (chieftain) of Ngāti Raukawa in the Tainui tribal confederation from the Waikato region, New Zealand. He probably lived in the first half of the seventeenth century. He is the ancestor of the Ngāti Maniapoto, Ngāti Hauā, and Ngāti Korokī Kahukura iwi, and of Rereahu, a group based around Maniaiti / Benneydale, Pureora, and Maraeroa in Waitomo District, whose status as a separate iwi or as a hapū (sub-tribe) of Ngāti Maniapoto is a matter of dispute.

== Life of Rereahu ==
Rereahu’s father was Raukawa, the son of Tūrongo and Māhina-a-rangi, and a direct male-line descendant of Hoturoa, leader of the Tainui waka. His mother was Turongoihi. He had three younger brothers: Kurawari (father of Whāita and Korokore), Whakatere, and Takihiku (father of Tama-te-hura, Upoko-iti, Wairangi, and Pipito).

=== War with Ngāti Hā ===
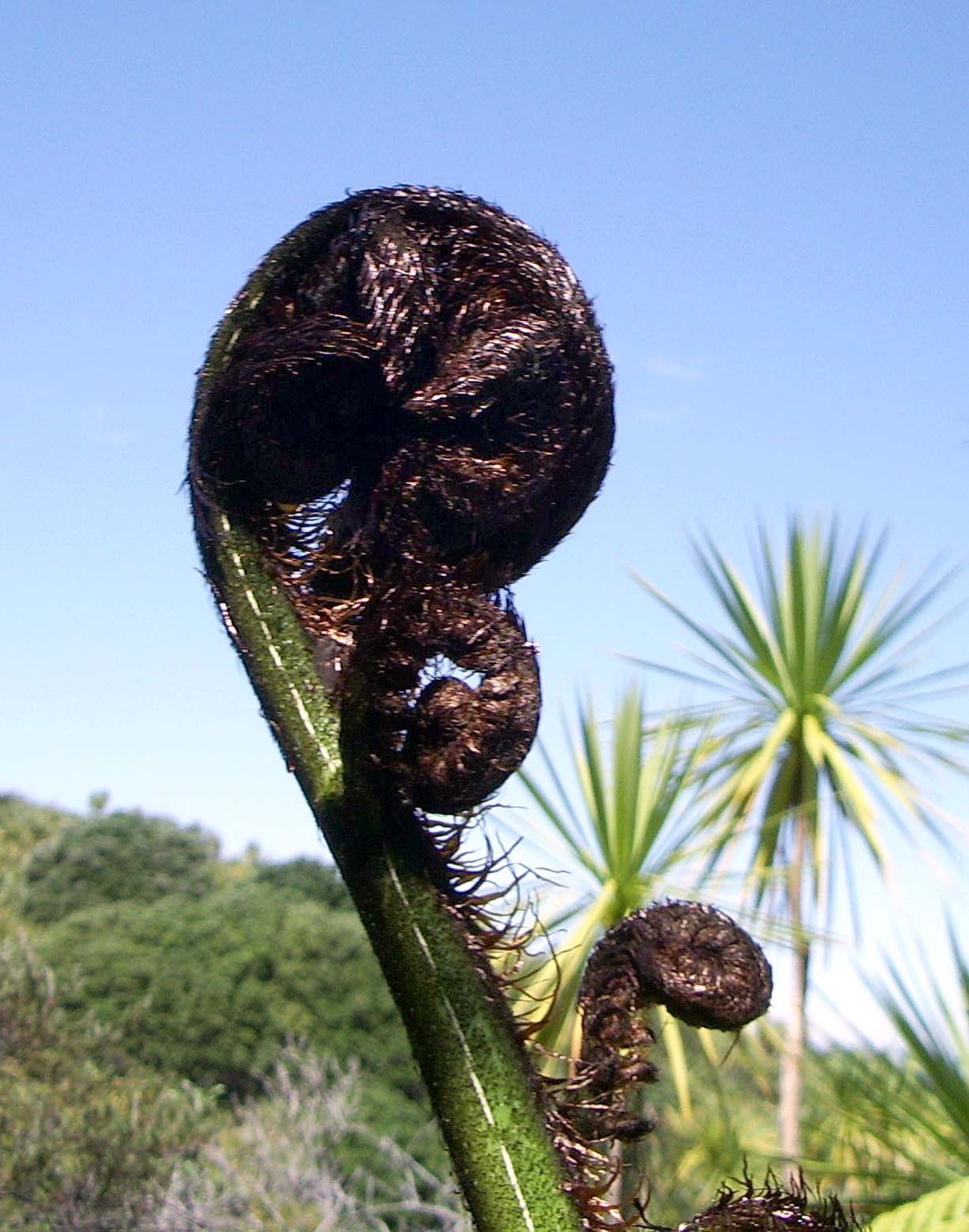
Mamaku ('black tree fern') frond.

There was a tribe called Ngāti Hā, led by three chiefs, Hā-nui ('Big Hā'), Hā-roa ('Long Hā'), and Hā-kūhā-nui ('Big-thigh Hā'), who had been driven out of the Taupō region by Ngāti Tūwharetoa and headed west, establishing a village on the Mōkau River, upstream from Puketutu. Rereahu noticed the Ngāti Hā at Te Tīroa while he was foraging for mamaku shoots and reported to his third-cousin Tamāio that they were coming to seize the land. As a result, Tamāio raised a war party, which advanced on the Ngāti Hā village and drove them out of the region.

=== Family ===
Rereahu married Rangi-ānewa, daughter of Tamāio. They settled in the village called Tihikoreoreo, next to Waimiha, where they had one son:

- Te Ihinga-a-rangi, ancestor of Ngāti Hauā, Ngāti Korokī Kahukura, and Ngāti Te Ihingarangi

Rereahu later married Hine-au-pounamu, whose parents were Tū-a-tangiroa and a daughter of the Ngāti-Hā chief Hā-kūhā-nui. Tū-a-tangiroa was a son of Uenuku-tuhatu Uetapu, the older brother of Tamāio’s father Uenuku-te-rangi-hōkā, which meant that Hine-au-pounamu was senior to Rangi-ānewa, which had implications for the relative status of Rereahu’s children. From this marriage, there were six sons and two daughters:

- Maniapoto
- Matakore, ancestor of Ngāti Matakore.
- Tū-whakahekeao, ancestor of Ngāti Tuwhakahekeao
- Tūrongo-tapu-ārau
- Te Io-wānanga or Te Āio-wānanga
- Kahu-ariari
- Kinohaku, who married Tū-irirangi, and was the ancestor of Ngāti Kinohaku
- Te Rongorito, who married her cousin Tama-te-hura.

These children were raised in the region around Kāwhia. Subsequently, they settled along the Waipā River and the Manga-o-kewa Stream, with a central hub at Te Kūiti. Rereahu is depicted on the front post of Te Tokanganui-a-noho marae at Te Kūiti. Rereahu himself settled at Ngā Herenga in Maraeroa, where he lived until his death. The location remains a wāhi tapu (sacred space) for his descendants.

When Rereahu was on his death-bed he decided to give his mana to Maniapoto, rather than Te Ihinga-a-rangi, because he thought the younger brother had proven himself a better leader. Therefore, he told Te Ihinga-a-rangi to go to the tuahu (altar) and perform the rituals, promising to pass the mana to him when he returned. While he was away, he called Maniapoto to him, covered his head in red ochre and instructed him to bite the crown of his head, passing the chiefly mana to him. Maniapoto objected, but Rereahu declared that Te Ihinga-a-rangi was illegitimate in some way. Pei Te Hurinui Jones suggests that this was because Rereahu already planned to marry Hine-pounamu when Te Ihinga-a-rangi was conceived and/or because Hine-moana was genealogically senior to Rangi-ānewa. Maniapoto accepted the mana and by the time Te Ihinga-a-rangi returned, Rereahu was dead. This led to a conflict between the brothers, in which Maniapoto was victorious.

== Rereahu tribe ==
Places associated with the Rereahu iwi/hapū
1 Mangapeehi Marae
2 Te Hape Marae
3 Te Ahoroa Marae
4 Ōwairaka Rāwhitiroa Marae
5 Maraeroa
6 Ngā Herenga

The Rereahu tribal group are descended from Rereahu. Their rohe centres on Mangapeehi Marae / Rereahu Wharenui near Maniaiti / Benneydale, and Te Hape Marae / Te Kaha Tuatini Wharenui near Pureora. They are also among the hapū that share Otewa Pā Marae / Aroha Nui Wharenui near Ōtorohanga, and of Te Ahoroa Marae / Tapairu Wharenui near Te Kūiti. The Ngāti Raukawa branch of Rereahu is based at Ōwairaka Rāwhitiroa Marae / Takihiku Wharenui near Parawera.

The status of Rereahu as an iwi or hapū is subject to dispute. Te Puni Kōkiri refers to them as a hapū within Ngāti Maniapoto and Ngāti Raukawa, while the Māori Maps project administered by Te Potiki National Trust calls them an iwi and a hapū in different contexts. In the context of the Ngāti Maniapoto Treaty of Waitangi claim, representatives of Rereahu have emphasised their “distinct identity within Ngāti Maniapoto” and some members have claimed not to be part of the Ngāti Maniapoto iwi.

=== Treaty of Waitangi settlement claims ===
Rereahu’s treaty claims are pursued by Te Maru o Rereahu Iwi Trust. This organisation, and others, form part of Te Whakaminenga o Rereahu, which has partnered with the Maniapoto Māori Trust Board as party of Ngāti Maniapoto’s treaty claim, but from 2016 it attempted to withdraw and pursue an independent claim. This culminated in an unsuccessful vote to withdraw from the Maniapoto claim in 2021.

Rereahu are among the groups represented by the Maraeroa A & B Trust, which administers two blocks of land within Te Rohe Pōtae, which were subdivided by the Native Land Court in 1887 and 1891 rulings. Following these rulings, the Crown began negotiations to purchase land in the blocks, acquiring 90% of it by 1908 and alienating the rest of it, in favour of private timber companies, between 1916 and 1958, through procedures established by the Native Land Act, 1909. They were the subject of a Treaty of Waitangi claim and were returned by the New Zealand government in 2012, under the Maraeroa A and B Blocks Claims Settlement Act.

== See also ==
- List of Māori iwi

== Bibliography ==
- Jones, Pei Te Hurinui; Biggs, Bruce (2004). Ngā iwi o Tainui : nga koorero tuku iho a nga tuupuna = The traditional history of the Tainui people. Auckland [N.Z.]: Auckland University Press. ISBN 1869403312.
- Phillips, F. L. (1989). Nga tohu a Tainui Landmarks of Tainui: a geographical record of Tainui traditional history. Otorohanga: Tohu Publishers. ISBN 9780908596263.
