= Tū-irirangi =

Māori chieftain

Places in the life of Tū-irirangi
1 Kāwhia
2 Ngaku-raho
3 Te Rua-o-te-manu

Tū-irirangi was a Māori rangatira (chieftain) of the Ngāti Whāita hapū of the Ngāti Raukawa iwi in the Tainui tribal confederation from the Waikato region, New Zealand. He is an ancestor of the Ngāti Kinohaku hapu (sub-tribe) of Ngāti Maniapoto and probably lived in the mid-to-late seventeenth century.

== Life ==
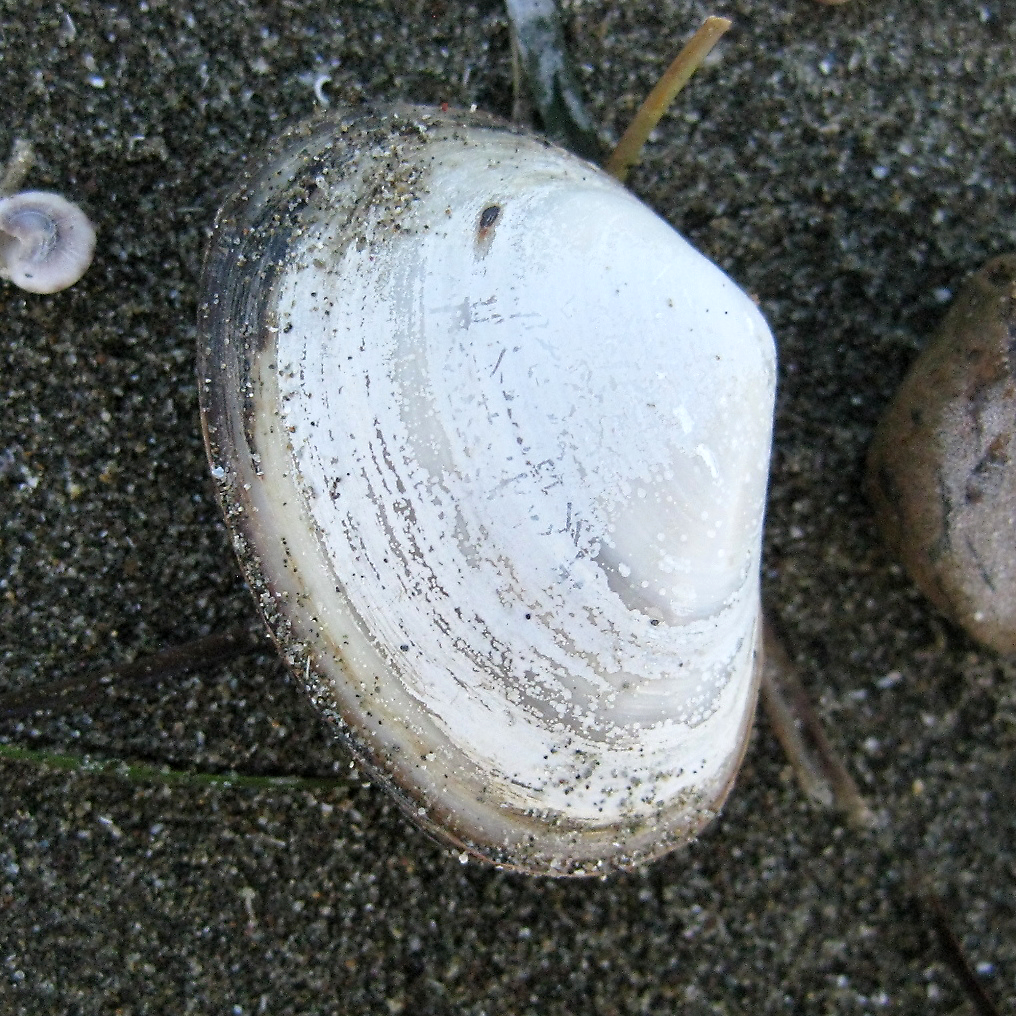
A pipi shell.

Tū-irirangi was born at Kāwhia. His father was Huiao, who was himself a son of Whāita and a great-grandson of Raukawa, the founder of Ngāti Raukawa, through whom he was a male-line descendant of Hoturoa, the leader of the Tainui canoe. His mother was Māpau-inuhia, a daughter of Uenuku-tuhatu, son of Whatihua and Rua-pū-tahanga. He had one full sister, Hine-moana, and a half-brother, Paiariki.

Tū-irirangi married Kinohaku, a daughter of Rereahu and sister of Maniapoto. He was her cousin on both sides, since her father, Rereahu was a son of Raukawa, while her mother Hine-au-Pounamu was the daughter of one of Māpau-inuhia's brothers. The amount of food gathered by Tū-irirangi and his tribe for the wedding feast was enormous and remains a source of mana for his descendants, Ngāti Kinohaku. In response to this, some Tainui people joked that Kinohaku had been “bought with pipi.”

=== Defence of Ngaku-raho ===
Tū-irirangi settled at Ngaku-raho, a rocky pinnacle near Hangatiki and very near the final base of Maniapoto at Te Ana-a-Maniapoto / Te Ana-a-uriuri, along with his elderly father Huiao. The earthworks and cuttings carried out to fortify the site were still visible as of 1932 and include an unusual trench designed to allow access to a cliff face so that besieged forces could rappel down from the summit to a spring halfway up the pinnacle, called Nga-roro-o-te-Huaki.

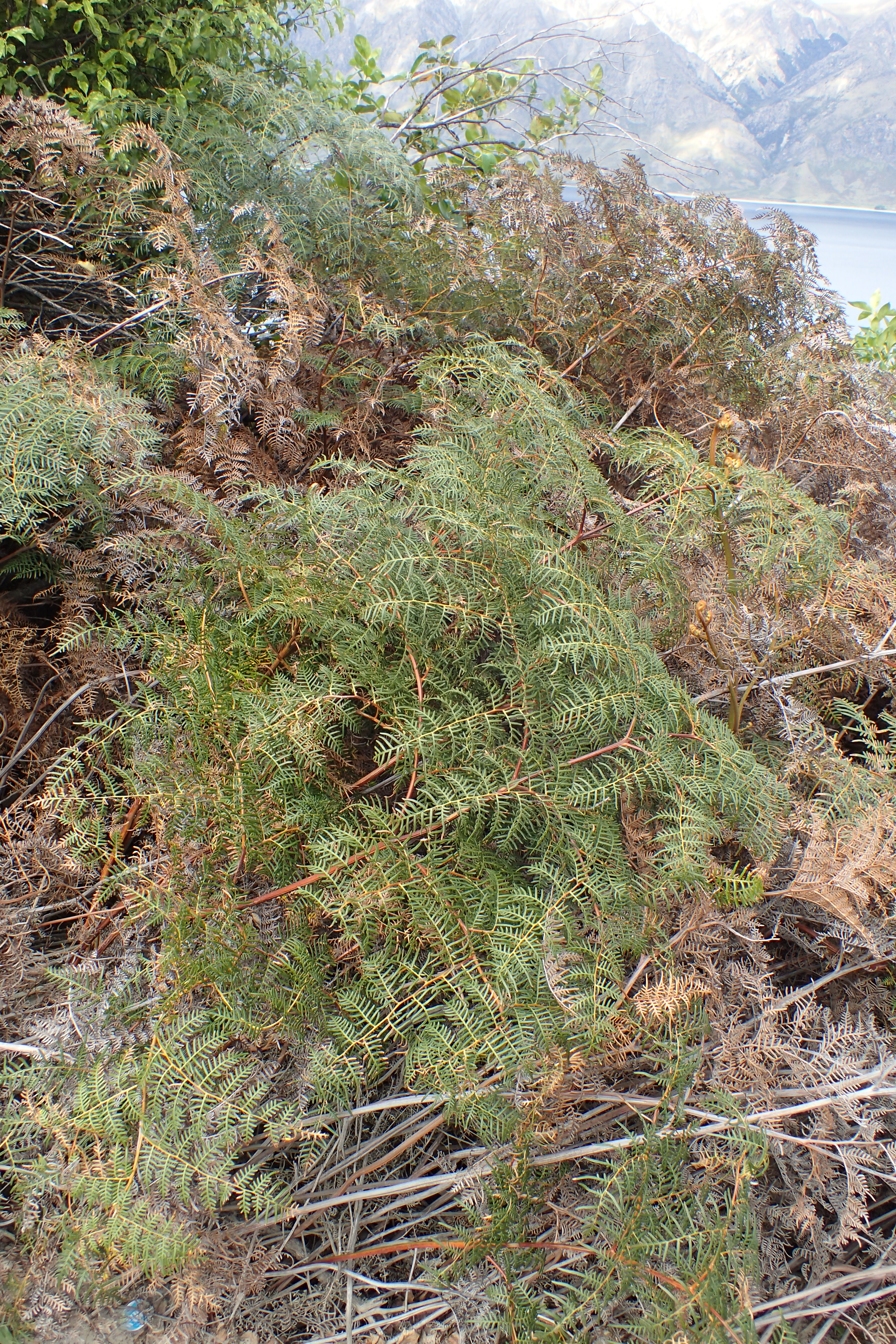
An area of rarauhe (bracken fern)

A rangatira named Pākira brought a war party from Whanganui against Ngaku-raho at a time when most of Tū-irirangi’s men were away on a fishing expedition. It is not clear why this expedition cames, Pei Te Hurinui Jones suggests that they were seeking revenge for the earlier campaign by Tamāio against the Ngāti Hā who had established themselves on the Whanganui River at modern Taumarunui. This war party including a group of Ngāti Tama from Parininihi. Pākira encamped at the spring Nga-roro-o-te-Huaki. Tū-irirangi and Huiao ran all over the fortress, making themselves visible at multiple different locations, and performing war dances in many different parts of it, so that the besiegers would think that there was a large force inside the fortress.

Eventually, however, it became clear that the rest of the tribe were not going to return from their fishing expedition in time, so Tū-irirangi and Huiao sent Hine-moana, Tū-irirangi’s sister down to Pākira’s camp and she arranged a peace treaty in exchange for marrying one of the members of his war-party, called Tūpito. Then Pākira’s force departed.

A year after the expedition, Hine-moana had a son with Tūpito and, when the sons of Tū-irirangi heard about it, they decided to go and visit the child and that if it was a boy, they would murder it, so that Tūpito could not boast about having a son as his first-born. However, when they visited Hine-moana realised what they were planning and held the child in such a way that they could not see his penis, so they thought he was a girl and left without killing him. Tūpito was furious about this and chased after Tū-irirangi’s sons intending to kill them, but they set the rarauhe (bracken fern) on fire and got away while Tūpito’s men were dealing with the fire.

=== Later life ===
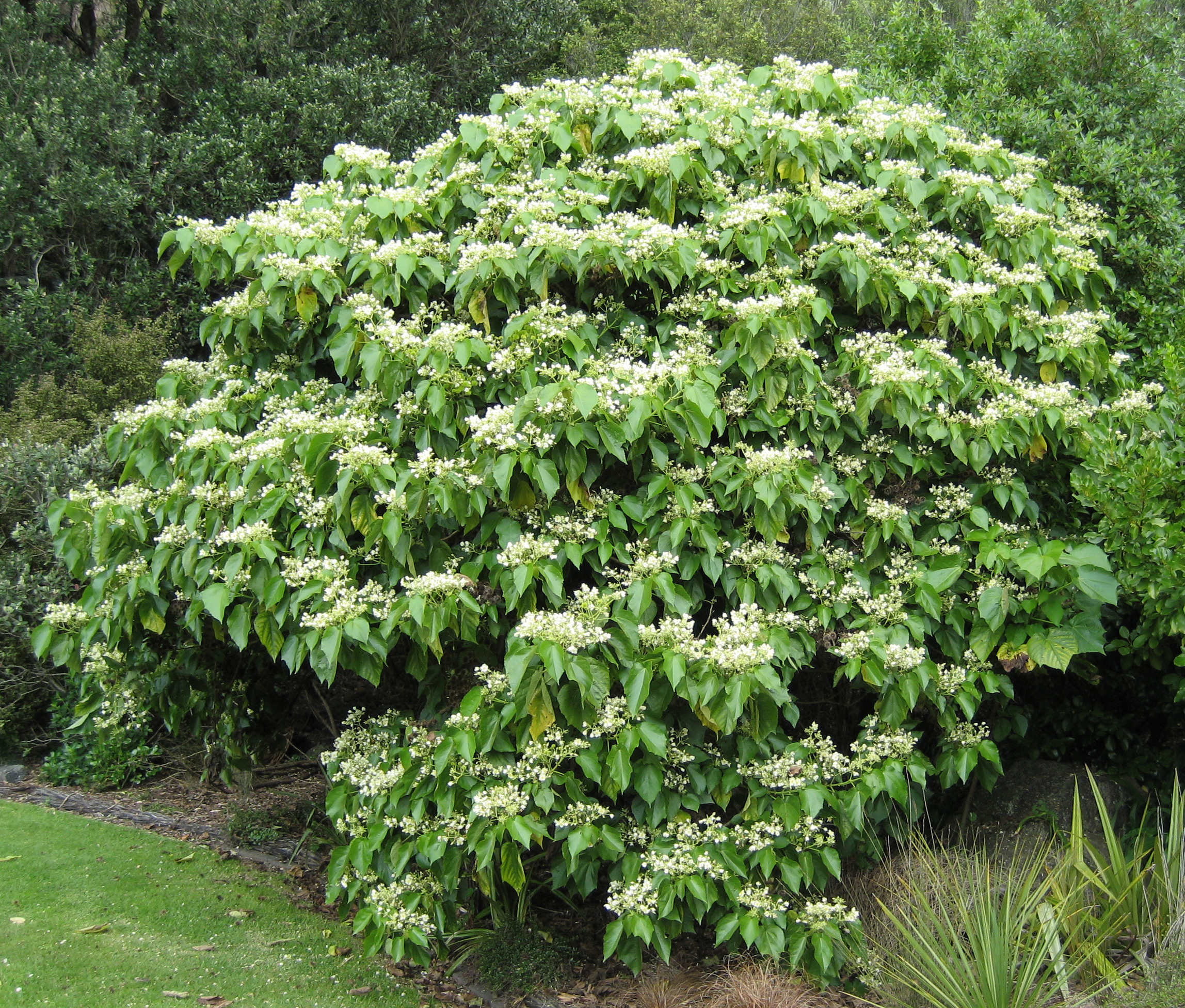
A whau tree.

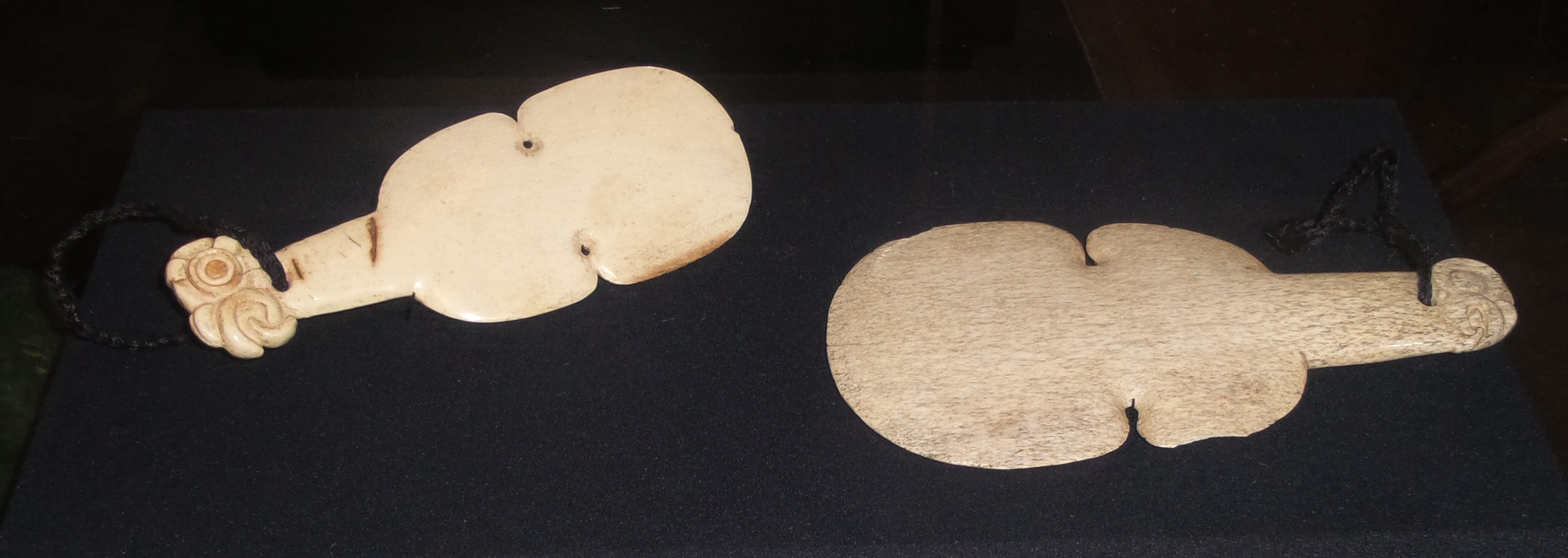
Two kotiate clubs.

When Tū-irirangi's brother-in-law, Maniapoto, was nearing death, he went to Pukeroa and told Tū-irirangi to gather the people for a hui. When the people had gathered, they performed the tū waewae haka (a war dance with weapons) for Maniapoto, who died before the end of the meeting.

After many years, Hinerangi visited Ngaku-raho, while she was fleeing the murder of her father, Mania-takamaiwaho. Tū-irirangi developed a desire to marry her. She refused, but Kinohaku was furious that her husband had considered marrying another woman, so she had an affair with Tū-irirangi’s half-brother Pai-ariki. When Tū-irirangi found out, he went to Pai-ariki’s village, Te Rua-o-te-manu near Te Kūiti, intending to murder him. When he arrived, Pai-ariki went out to him without any weapons and said, "Your taiaha (spear) can be your brother from now on." Then Tū-irirangi was ashamed and went away to Kāwhia, where he re-married and had another son. Pai-ariki moved to Kāwā, where he married Kuo and Hinengako.

One day, toward the end of the seventeenth century, Tū-irirangi went from Kāwhia to the Wai-tētē Creek, where he started to make a fishing raft from a whau tree. A man called Whanowhano-ake came out from nearby Manu-aitu and struck Tū-irirangi on the head with his kotiate club, killing him. Tū-irirangi's son Te Ariari escaped and told the people of Kāwhia, who led a number of unsuccessful expeditions against the fortresses of Tātahi, Kōrero-maiwaho, and Te Rua-o-te-huia, until his death was eventually avenged by a large force led by Ika-tāmure, Kārewarewa, and two thousand Te Ati Awa from Taranaki.

== Family ==
Tū-irirangi first married Kinohaku and had three sons and one daughter:

- Whakapau-tangaroa
- Kāhui-tangaroa
- Tangaroa-kino, who killed Hou-taketake after his uncle Maniapoto’s conflict with him.
- Rangipare, who was meant to marry Wairangi, but eloped with her cousin Tū-taka-moana, son of Maniapoto, leading to the Battle of Waiponga:

- Rangatahi, an ancestor of the Ngāti Rangatahi and Ngāti Urunumia hapu of Ngāti Maniapoto.

After he moved to Kāwhia, Tū-irirangi re-married to Māmaua / Maromuka, by whom he had four sons:

- Tūahu-māhina
- Parekino
- Te Pūhara-o-Tainui, who started the War of Te Whate-o-hua-raratahi against Tonga-nui and the other sons of Māhanga by chopping down a tōtara tree with his uncle Pai-ariki, and was killed by Tonga-nui at Te Kawaroa.
- Tū-paenga-roa, who took in Pai-ariki after the death of Te Pūhara-o-Tainui and killed Tonga-nui and his brothers while they were besieging his fortress at Manu-aitu.
- Te Ariari.

== Sources ==
Pei Te Hurinui Jones and Leslie George Kelly report the life of Tū-irirangi, based on oral accounts that they both received from Whare Hotu of Oparure (an 8th generation descendant of Tū-irirangi). Kelly also received some information from Newton Moerua of Hangatiki.

== Bibliography ==
- Jones, Pei Te Hurinui; Biggs, Bruce (2004). Ngā iwi o Tainui : nga koorero tuku iho a nga tuupuna = The traditional history of the Tainui people. Auckland [N.Z.]: Auckland University Press. ISBN 1869403312.
- Kelly, Leslie G. (1934). "Ngaku-raho Pa, Hangatika". Journal of the Polynesian Society. Vol. 43, no. 170. pp. 101–105.
