= Te Ihinga-a-rangi =

Te Ihinga-a-rangi was a Māori rangatira (chieftain) of Ngāti Raukawa in the Tainui tribal confederation from the Waikato region, New Zealand and is the ancestor of the Ngāti Hauā and Ngāti Korokī Kahukura iwi and the Te Ihinga-a-rangi hapu of Ngāti Maniapoto. He probably lived in the first half of the seventeenth century.

== Life ==
Te Ihinga-a-rangi was the first-born son of Rereahu, who was a direct descendant of Hoturoa (the commander of the Tainui canoe), and his first wife, Rangi-ānewa, daughter of Tamāio. He was born in a village called Tihikoreoreo, next to Waimiha. After his birth, Rereahu remarried to Hine-au-pounamu, and had several children, including Maniapoto. When he had grown up, Te Ihinga-a-rangi settled at Ōngārahu, southeast of Ōtorohanga.

=== Conflict with Maniapoto ===
Places in the life of Te Ihinga-a-rangi
1 Waimiha
2 Ōngārahu
3 Mohoao-nui
4 Te Tiki-o-Te-Ihinga-a-rangi
5 Tīroa

When Rereahu was on his death-bed he decided to give his mana to Maniapoto, rather than Te Ihinga-a-rangi, because he thought the younger brother had proven himself a better leader. Therefore, he told Te Ihinga-a-rangi to go to the tuahu (altar) and perform the rituals, promising to pass the mana to him when he returned. While he was away, he called Maniapoto to him, covered his head in red ochre and instructed him to bite the crown of his head, passing the chiefly mana to him. Maniapoto objected, but Rereahu declared that Te Ihinga-a-rangi was illegitimate in some way. Pei Te Hurinui Jones suggests that this was because Rereahu already planned to marry Hine-pounamu when Te Ihinga-a-rangi was conceived and/or because Hine-moana was genealogically senior to Rangi-ānewa. Maniapoto accepted the mana and by the time Te Ihinga-a-rangi returned, Rereahu was dead.

One of the guests who came from Kāwhia for Rereahu's tangihanga (funeral) was Tū-tarawa, who was the brother of Maniapoto's mother and whose son was married to Te Ihinga-a-rangi's great-granddaughter, Hine Whatihua. He visited Te Ihinga-a-rangi, who served him a meal of bird-meat, giving Tū-tarawa the worse portion (the heads), while keeping the rest for himself. Te Inhinga-a-rangi indicated that he intended to murder Maniapoto. After this, Tū-tarawa visited Maniapoto's house, Hikurangi, at Mohoao-nui, a little to the northwest. Maniapoto also served his uncle bird-meat, but gave him the better portion, so he told Maniapoto about Te Ihinga-a-rangi's intentions.

Maniapoto told Tū-tarawa to return to Te Ihinga-a-rangi and tell him that Maniapoto had decided to abandon Mohoao-nui and settle somewhere in the east. Then Maniapoto and his people left the village, travelled east for a way before circling around and hiding on the river bank to the west of the village. Thinking that the village had been abandoned, Te Ihinga-a-rangi brought a group up to settle there and was ambushed. Most of Te Ihinga-a-rangi's people were killed, but he was captured alive and brought to Maniapoto, who spat on his head, shaming Te Ihinga-a-rangi and securing his own pre-eminence.

=== Departure and death ===
Following this defeat, Te Ihinga-a-rangi left the region and relocated with his family to Te Tiki-o-Te-Ihinga-a-rangi, just west of modern Cambridge. He died a few years later and his children interred his bones in Tūtū-hauhau cave near Tīroa.

=== Family ===
Te Ihinga-a-rangi married Haeata and had three sons: Kāhui-ao, Ue-haeroa, and Turaki-wai. These three elder children were born before he left Ōngārahu and settled at Ōngarue and Waimihi after his death, becoming the ancestors of the Te Ihinga-a-rangi hapu of Ngāti Maniapoto, which is still based in the region today.

After Te Ihinga-a-rangi moved to Te Tiki-o-Te-Ihinga-a-rangi, he had a fourth son, Kurī, by a second wife, Ringa-arikura. Kurī stayed in that region after his father's death and his descendants are Ngāti Hauā (which has marae in Hamilton, Tauwhare, Morrinsville, and Waharoa) and Ngāti Korokī Kahukura (which has marae at Maungatautari and Arapuni).

He also had a daughter, Hine-mapuhia, who was an ancestor of Hotu-mauea.

=== Sources ===
The story of Te Ihinga-a-rangi and his conflict with Maniapoto is recorded by Pei Te Hurinui Jones, based on oral accounts that he heard from unspecified Tainui elders. The story was cited by Ngāti Maniapoto elders during a conflict about the status of the Rereahu tribe within Ngāti Maniapoto in 2016.

== Te Ihinga-a-rangi hapu ==
The rohe of Te Ihinga-a-rangi hapu centres on the Waimiha area, where they have a marae called Waimiha and a wharenui called Te Ihingarangi. They also share Mangapeehi marae / Rereahu wharenui near Maniaiti / Benneydale, and Te Hape marae / Te Kaha Tuatini wharenui near Pureora with the Rereahu tribal grouping.

== Bibliography ==
- Jones, Pei Te Hurinui; Biggs, Bruce (2004). Ngā iwi o Tainui : nga koorero tuku iho a nga tuupuna = The traditional history of the Tainui people. Auckland [N.Z.]: Auckland University Press. ISBN 1869403312.
