= Waimiha =

Locality in Ruapehu District, Manawatū-Whanganui Region, New Zealand

- Rural community
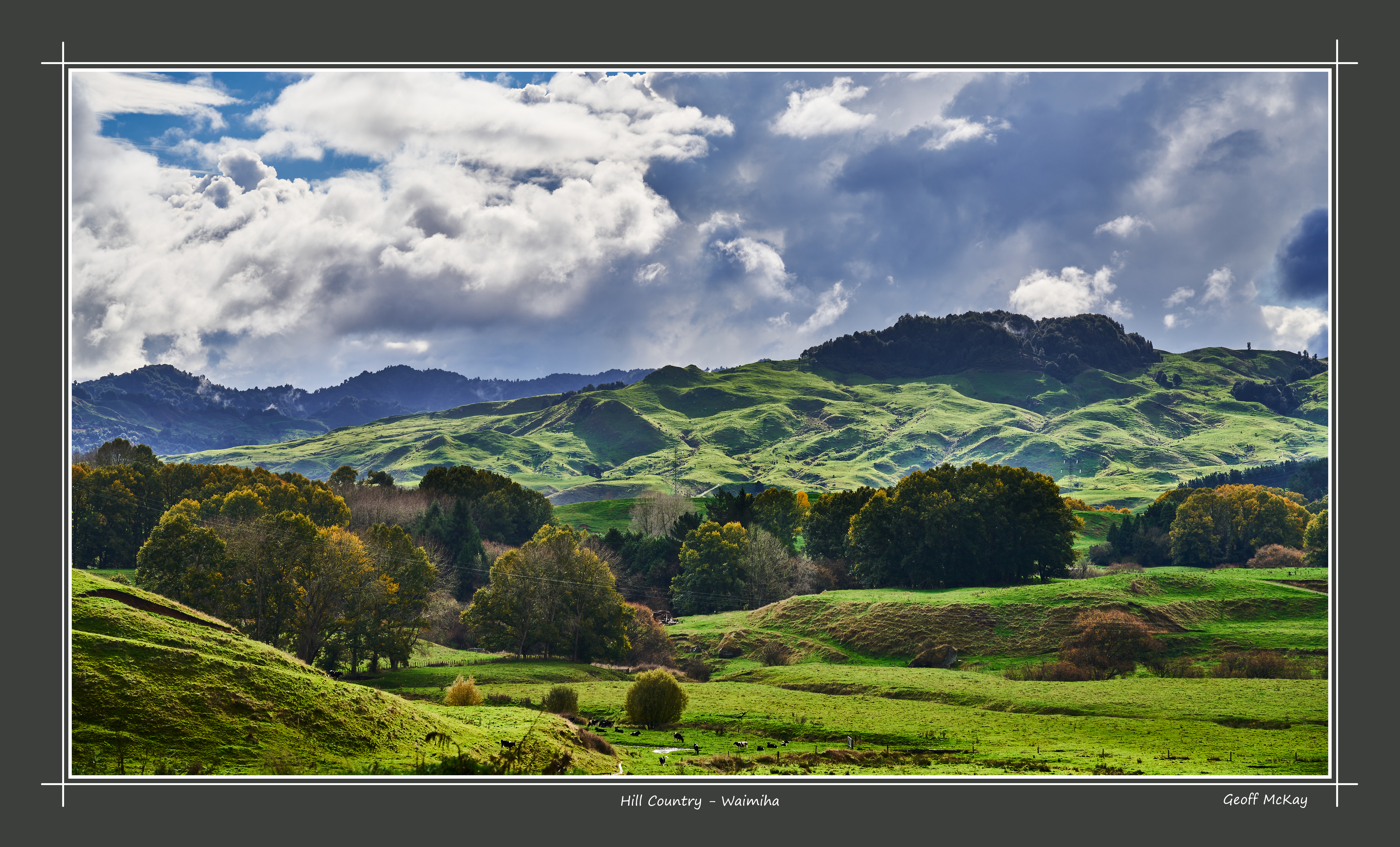
- Waimiha countryside
- Interactive map of Waimiha
- Coordinates: 38.616°S 175.316°E
- Country: New Zealand
- Region: Manawatū-Whanganui
- District: Ruapehu District
- Ward: Ruapehu General Ward; Ruapehu Māori Ward
- Community: Taumarunui-Ōhura Community
- Electorates: Taranaki-King Country; Te Tai Hauāuru (Māori)

Government
  - Territorial Authority: Ruapehu District Council
  - Regional council: Horizons Regional Council
  - Mayor of Ruapehu: Weston Kirton
  - Taranaki-King Country MP: Barbara Kuriger
  - Te Tai Hauāuru MP: Debbie Ngarewa-Packer

Area
  - Total: 394.10 km^{2} (152.16 sq mi)

Population (2023 Census)
  - Total: 153
  - Density: 0.388/km^{2} (1.01/sq mi)

Waimiha is a rural community in the Ruapehu District and Manawatū-Whanganui region of New Zealand's North Island.

It is located south of Te Kūiti and Benneydale, and north of Taumarunui and Ongarue.

== History ==
Māori have lived in Waimiha for centuries, hunting birds from the forested hills.

The local Waimiha Marae is a tribal meeting ground of the Ngāti Maniapoto hapū of Te Ihingarangi. It includes Te Ihingarangi meeting house.

Waimiha developed after the railway opened in 1901, which was followed by sawmillers and farmers. Crown land in the area was prepared for settlement in the 1910s. By the 1920s there were general stores, boarding houses, stables, a post office, butchery and cinema.

In the late 1920s, under a government policy introduced by Āpirana Ngata, some Māori land owners received funds to convert their land into farmland. By the 1930s, 150 hectares (370 acres) of Māori land at Waimihia had been converted. Some of this land was later sold off or consolidated into larger farms.

The Waimiha farm scheme was one of the Māori land blocks in the country to be successfully converted to farmland. Local Farmers' Union president Ngaronui Jones, who oversaw the conversion, also developed a farm on his own ancestral land.

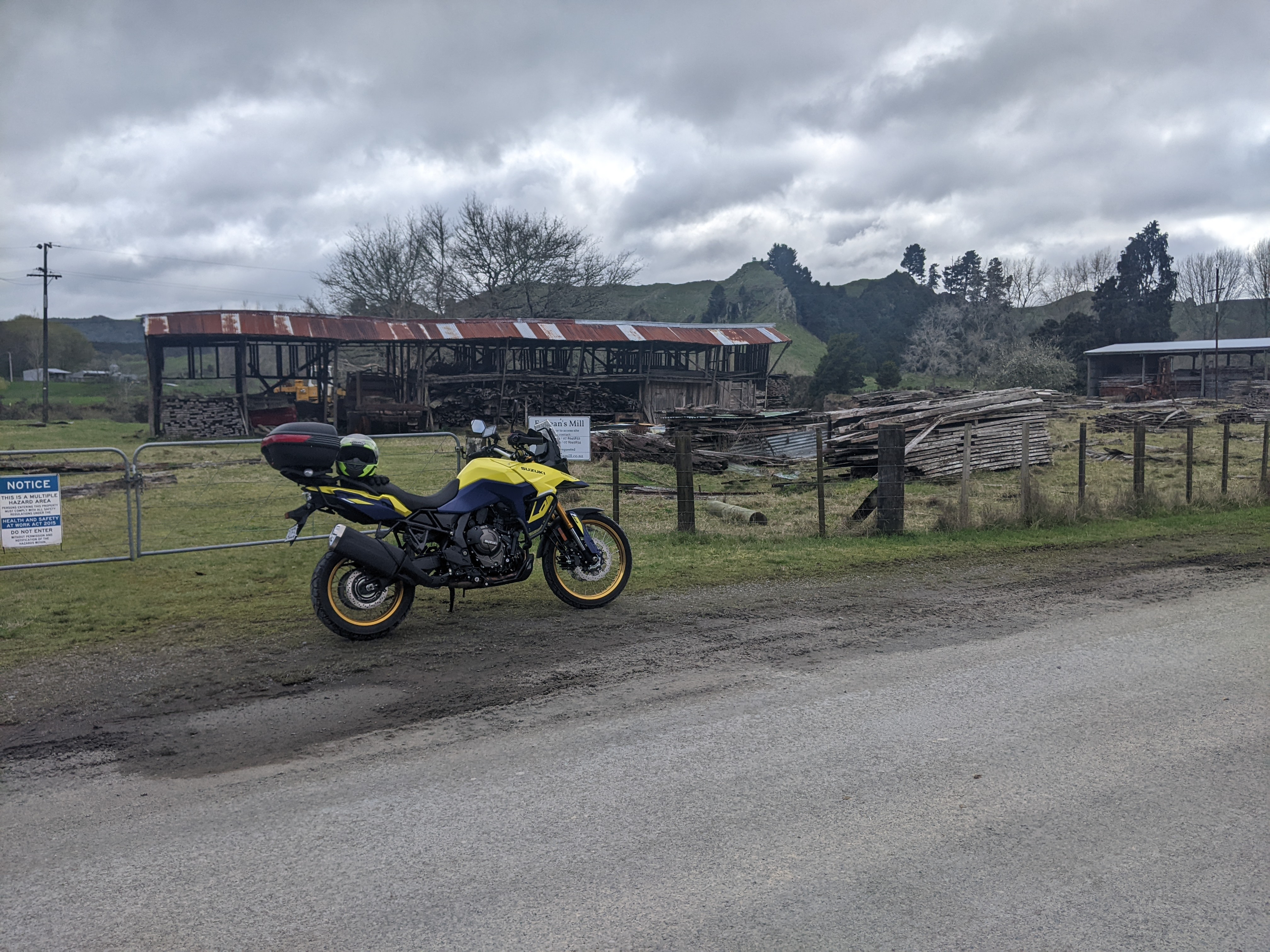
Endean's Mill in 1924

Endean’s mill, New Zealand’s only surviving native timber sawmill, operated in the area between 1927 and 1996. The complete remnants of the mill are no longer usable. However, it remains on display as an open air museum, and has featured in photography exhibitions. Twenty-eight other abandoned sawmill sites have also been identified in the valley. Milling peaked in the 1940s.

The Waimiha Railway Station, extremely narrow Poro-o-Tarao railway tunnel and Picture Palace hall were landmarks in the town when the township was a stop on the North Island Main Trunk line, from the 1900s to the 1980s. Alfred Hamish Reed was recorded spending a night sleeping at the railway station in 1960.

The post office closed in 1988 and the last shop in 1991. In the 1990s Carter Holt Harvey replaced livestock farms with pine plantations.

== Demographics ==
Waimiha locality covers 394.10 km^{2} (152.16 sq mi). The locality is part of the larger Otangiwai-Ohura statistical area.

Historical population
Year	Pop.	±% p.a.
2006	162	—
2013	150	−1.09%
2018	144	−0.81%
2023	153	+1.22%

Waimiha had a population of 153 in the 2023 New Zealand census, an increase of 9 people (6.2%) since the 2018 census, and an increase of 3 people (2.0%) since the 2013 census. There were 84 males and 69 females in 63 dwellings. The median age was 38.1 years (compared with 38.1 years nationally). There were 27 people (17.6%) aged under 15 years, 27 (17.6%) aged 15 to 29, 78 (51.0%) aged 30 to 64, and 18 (11.8%) aged 65 or older.

People could identify as more than one ethnicity. The results were 72.5% European (Pākehā), 33.3% Māori, and 9.8% Asian. English was spoken by 98.0%, Māori by 3.9%, and other languages by 7.8%. No language could be spoken by 2.0% (e.g. too young to talk). The percentage of people born overseas was 13.7, compared with 28.8% nationally.

Religious affiliations were 23.5% Christian, 3.9% Māori religious beliefs, 2.0% Buddhist, and 2.0% other religions. People who answered that they had no religion were 66.7%, and 5.9% of people did not answer the census question.

Of those at least 15 years old, 12 (9.5%) people had a bachelor's or higher degree, 63 (50.0%) had a post-high school certificate or diploma, and 51 (40.5%) people exclusively held high school qualifications. The median income was $44,300, compared with $41,500 nationally. 6 people (4.8%) earned over $100,000 compared to 12.1% nationally. The employment status of those at least 15 was 75 (59.5%) full-time, 12 (9.5%) part-time, and 6 (4.8%) unemployed.

== Education ==
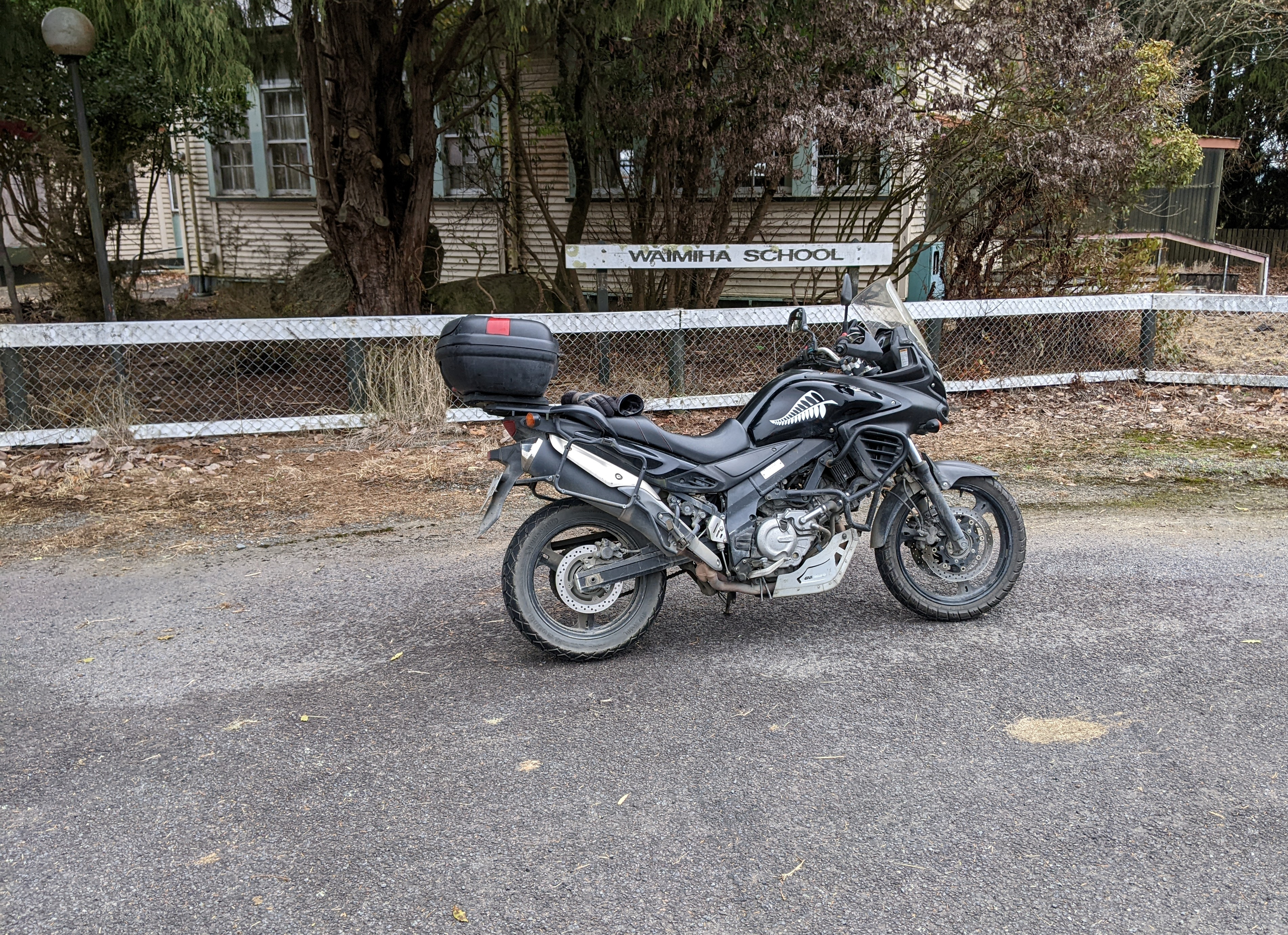
The derelict school in 2024.

A native school existed at Waimiha in 1910. Waimiha School opened in 1926 and closed in 2005, after projected roll numbers dropped below the numbers required to teach literacy and numeracy.

== Events ==
Waimiha is a stop on the New Zealand motorcycle racing circuit, and has featured in the course for the New Zealand Rally Championship.

Ruapehu District Council hold periodic community meetings at Waimiha for residents to raise concerns.

== See also ==
- Waimiha Sawmilling Company Limited v Waione Timber Company
