= Ngāti Maniapoto =

Māori iwi (tribe) in Aotearoa New Zealand

- Iwi (tribe) in Māoridom
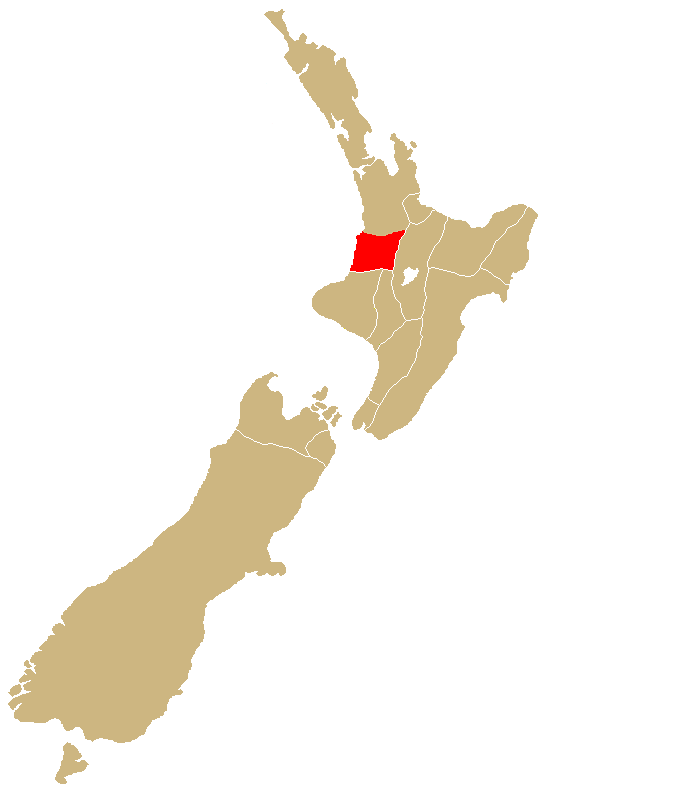
- Rohe (region): Waikato-Waitomo
- Waka (canoe): Tainui
- Population: 45,930

Ngāti Maniapoto is an iwi (tribe) based in the Waikato-Waitomo region of New Zealand's North Island. It is part of the Tainui confederation, the members of which trace their whakapapa (genealogy) back to people who arrived in New Zealand on the waka (canoe) Tainui. The 2018 New Zealand census reports show an estimated population of 45,930 people who affiliated with Maniapoto, making it the 9th most-populous iwi in New Zealand.

== History ==
Ngāti Maniapoto trace their lineage to their eponymous ancestor Maniapoto, an 11th generation descendant of the people who arrived on the Tainui waka and settled at the Kawhia Harbour. His father Rereahu led the Tainui expansion to the interior of the Waikato region, and Maniapoto settled in the southern Waikato area. Maniapoto's older brother Te Ihinga-a-rangi settled at Maungatautari, forming the Ngāti Hauā and Ngāti Korokī Kahukura iwi.

== Hapū and marae ==
There are many marae (area in front of a wharenui) in the Ngāti Maniapoto area, one of the notable ones being Te Tokanga Nui A Noho at Te Kuiti (the narrowing) in King Country. This whare was given to Ngāti Maniapoto by Te Kooti, a Rongowhakaata guerilla fighter who lived in the region for the period while on the run from colonial forces which undertook searches for him during the New Zealand Wars. Of equal significance but less publicly known is Tiroa Pā where the last Io whare wānanga (traditional study centre) was held in a specially crafted whare called Te Whetu Marama o Hinawa at Te Miringa Te Kakara. The other whare wānanga was near present-day Piopio and was called Kahuwera. It stood on the hill of the same name and commanded a panoramic view of the Mokau River valley across the Maraetaua block.

- Ngāti Rora
- Ngāti Hinewai
- Ngāti Taiawa or Taewa
- Ngāti Kaputuhi
- Ngāti Kinohaku
- Ngāti Ngutu
- Ngāti Mokau
- Ngāti Apakura
- Ngāti Matakore
- Ngāti Raukawa
- Ngāti Utu
- Ngāti Urunumia
- Ngāti Paretekawa
- Ngāti Parewaeono
- Ngāti Waiora
- Ngāti Hari
- Ngāti Uekaha
- Ngāti Rangatahi
- Ngāti Peehi

=== Ngāti Te Kanawa ===
Ngāti Te Kanawa is an iwi based in Taumarunui and one of the forty main hapū of the Ngāti Maniapoto confederation, which came into existence around 1860. They trace their whakapapa to the tupuna (ancestor) Te Kanawa, who was the great-great-great grandson of the tupuna Maniapoto and comes off Uruhina (child of Rungaterangi and Pareraukawa). The families who carry the name Te Kanawa today have a direct male blood line whakapapa to the tupuna Te Kanawa, also known as Te Kanawa Pango.

== Notable people ==
- Wiremu Te Awhitu, Catholic priest
- Sandor Earl, league player
- Mihi Edwards, memoirist, social worker, teacher and kaumātua
- Taonui Hikaka, Paramount chief
- Dame Rangimārie Hetet, famous weaver and fabric artist
- Dr Pei Te Hurinui Jones, academic and writer
- Richard Kahui, rugby union player
- Dame Kiri Te Kanawa, opera singer
- Rewi Manga Maniapoto, warrior chief
- Sandra Morrison, professor at the University of Waikato
- Temuera Morrison, actor
- Pania Newton, activist
- Evelyn Patuawa-Nathan, poet
- Puhiwahine, composer
- Tiki Taane, singer
- Rongo Wetere, educator
- Wahanui, negotiator chief
- Kahurangi Carter, politician
- Dan Hooker, UFC fighter
