= Ngāti Hauā =

Māori iwi (tribe) in Aotearoa New Zealand

- Iwi (tribe) in Māoridom
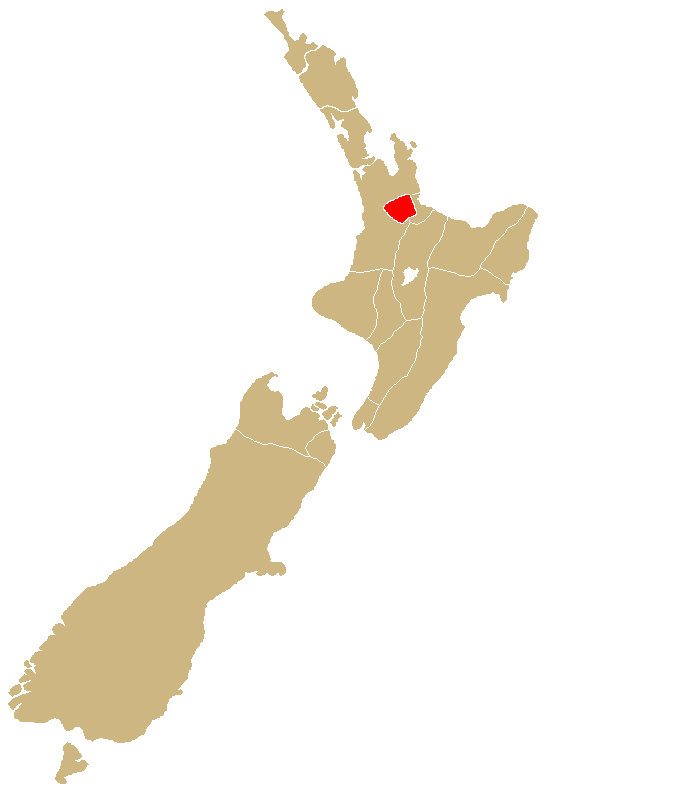
- Rohe (region): Waikato/Bay of Plenty
- Waka (canoe): Tainui
- Population: 4,800 (as registered in 2010)
- Website: www.ngatihauaiwitrust.co.nz

Ngāti Hauā is a Māori iwi of the eastern Waikato of New Zealand. It is part of the Tainui confederation. Its traditional area includes Matamata, Cambridge, Maungakawa, the Horotiu district along the Waikato River and the Maungatautari district, and its eastern boundary is the Kaimai Range. Leaders of the tribe have included Te Waharoa (1820s and 1830s), his son Wiremu Tamihana (1840s to 1860s) and Tamihana's son Tupu Taingakawa. The tribe has played a prominent role in the Māori King Movement, with Tamihana and descendants being known as the "Kingmakers".

== Rohe ==
Marae of Ngāti Hauā (blue); border points (red)
1 Raungaiti
2 Te Iti a Hauā (Tauwhare)
3 Waimakariri
4 Kai a Te Mata
5 Rukumoana (The Top Pā)
6 Mount Te Aroha
7 Mount Maungatautari
8 Taupiri Gorge

The Ngāti Hauā Iwi Trust board established their rohe as the central Waikato region with the approximate boundaries running from Mount Te Aroha in the northeast down to Mount Maungatautari in the southeast, along a line south of Cambridge to about 8 km west of the Waikato River, then along a line parallel to, but west of, the Waikato river to the south edge of the Taupiri Gorge. This includes the main towns of Hamilton, Cambridge, Matamata and Morrinsville. The rohe is based on 1840 maps and Pei Te Hurinui Jones' book Nga Iwi o Tainui. Ngati Haua acknowledges that other iwi and hapu may have overlapping interests around the borders of their tribal rohe.

As of 2010 the number of registered Ngati Haua, based on the Waikato/Tainui actual registration system 2010 was about 4,800, although it was expected that registered numbers would likely rise to about 10,000 after the settlement with the government.

The iwi contains five hapū: Ngāti Rangi Tawhaki, Ngāti Te Oro, Ngāti Te Rangitaupi, Ngāti Waenganui, and Ngāti Werewere. They make use of five marae, as follows:

Marae of Ngati Haua
Marae	Wharenui	Hapū	Location
Raungaiti	Te Oro	Ngāti Rangi Tawhaki and Ngāti Te Oro	Waharoa
Te Iti a Hauā (Tauwhare)	Hauā	Ngāti Te Oro, Ngāti Te Rangitaupi, Ngāti Waenganui, and Ngāti Werewere	Tauwhare
Waimakariri	Waenganui	Ngāti Waenganui	Hamilton
Kai a Te Mata	Wairere	Ngāti Werewere	Morrinsville
Rukumoana (The Top Pā)	Werewere	Ngāti Werewere	Morrinsville

== History ==
Ngāti Hauā trace their lineage to Te Ihinga-a-rangi, an 11th generation descendant of the people who arrived on the Tainui waka and settled at the Kawhia Harbour. His father Rereahu led the Tainui expansion into the interior of the Waikato region, and Te Ihinga-a-rangi settled at Maungatautari. Te Ihing-a-rangi's younger brother Maniapoto settled to the south, forming the Ngāti Maniapoto iwi.

=== Musket Wars ===
Te Waharoa was the war leader of the small Ngati Haua iwi whose home territory was around Matamata. During the early stages of the brutal inter iwi and hapu Muskets Wars, Ngati Haua avoided direct attack from the musket armed northern tribes but in 1821 suffered the consequences of a savage attack on the main Ngati Maru Pā at Te Totara a short distance to the north. Ngati Maru survivors in large numbers fled into Ngati Haua rohe and eventually overwhelmed them and their resources, threatening the mana (meaning "power" or "authority") of the iwi. Te Waharoa, aware of the disparity in number, was embittered when Ngati Maru built Kaipaki Pa very close to his own. He devised a strategy to get Ngati Maru to lower their guard by pretending to leave for Omokoroa at Tauranga. At night he returned and launched a surprise attack on Ngati Maru forcing them out of the area. Conflict continued to rage throughout the area as Te Waharoa joined with relatives to fight in Rotorua and for regular seasonal invasions in Taranaki during which he took part in the massacre at Pukerangiora in 1831 when 1,000-1,500 people were killed and eaten. He also joined with relatives in Tauranga to help defend them against invading Ngāpuhi.

During the latter stages of the Musket Wars the CMS missionaries tried to establish a mission station in Ngati Haua territory to try to bring peace between the marauding tribes. In 1833, William Thomas Fairburn, John Alexander Wilson, John Morgan and James Preece established a mission station at Puriri on the Waihou River. In 1835, John Morgan had moved to the Mangapouri Mission, which was located near Te Awamutu on the northern bank of the Puniu River, close to where it joins the Waipā River. In 1835, John Wilson and Rev. A. N. Brown established a mission station at Matamata, and in the same year Thomas Chapman established a mission station at Rotorua.

Te Waharoa was keen to have the missionaries in his rohe, but he was not interested in their Christian message and never attended church services. The missionaries' efforts were thwarted by the outbreak of war between Waikato/Ngati Haua on one hand v Arawa from Rotorua on the other as they sought vengeance for earlier attacks. The missionaries witnessed scenes of mass cannibalism, with 60 bodies eaten in one day. Children were taken from the mission school to take part in eating bodies. Ngati Haua were victorious in 1836, but Arawa arrived to seek revenge. Morgan wrote "we find ourselves isolated in a savage land". The situation remained volatile, and in September 1836 Marupo of Ngati Haua looted a large quantity of missionary property and raided the mission house at Rotorua. The missionaries were saved by Wiremu Tamihana who intervened and returned some of their property but the Rotorua mission and Matamata mission were abandoned as too unsafe. In late March 1836, a war party led by Te Waharoa arrived at Tauranga and the missionary families boarded the Columbine as a safety precaution on 31 March and travelled to the CMS mission at Paihia. The CMS missionaries returned to Tauranga in January 1838 and attempted to promote peace.

=== New Zealand Land Wars ===
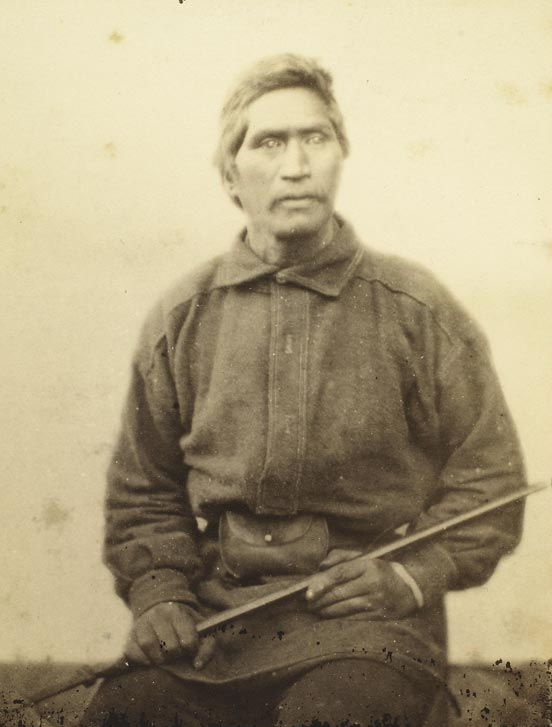
Wiremu Tamihana sitting. Photograph taken by John Kinder in 1860. The photograph is labelled with Tamihana's anglicized name, William Thompson

Ngati Haua played an active, though small part in the Taranaki Wars. King Potatau had forbidden Waikato and Ngati Haua iwi to take part in the war in Taranaki against the Pākehā but when he died Ngati Haua decide to join a second expedition to Taranaki despite their chief Wiremu Tamihana being against it. Ngati Haua provided 80 warriors led by Wetini Taiparutu. They were armed with shotguns and tomahawks. In the first battle of this campaign at an old pa on a small hillock at Mahoetahi near New Plymouth on 6 November 1860, Wetini was killed along with about a quarter of the Ngati Haua with many wounded. Total Māori casualties were 50 and 4 British died. Some authorities have put the defeat down to a combination of naivety on the part of Ngati Haua and treachery on the part of Taranaki leaders Hapurona and Wiremu Kīngi Te Rangitāke. The Ngati Awa, instead of descending on the British flank, as had been agreed, merely fired their guns in the air from a safe distance and retreated. A second attack at Huirangi was made in an effort to gain revenge but this also ended in a defeat. Many Ngati Haua returned with serious wounds including Te Whitu who had his jaw shot away. These events underpinned the decision by Ngati Haua to join the Kingitanga forces during the Invasion of the Waikato in 1863.

Ngati Haua were one of the several iwi who took part in attacks on Auckland. Most of these attacks were raids on outposts or isolated farms. The attacks were believed to be instigated by Rewi Maniapoto but Tamihana took part in at least one and his sons in several. The attacks were designed to win the Kingites time to build the Mere Mere line of defence. After the defeat at Meremere Wiremu Tamahana lead about 100 Ngati Haua into Rangiriri Pa to join other Waikato iwi notably Ngati Mahuta. After the defeat at Rangiriri Tamihana sent his greenstone mere to General Cameron as an indication of surrender but Cameron was not interested in talking to him about a limited surrender. The Ngati Haua retreated to Maungatautari where they began to rebuild Te Tiki pa on the slopes of the mountain to make it suitable for contemporary warfare. Cameron followed him with about half of his force. Three days after Cameron's forces arrived the Ngati Haua suddenly left the pa. A short time later they arrived at the Battle of Orakau with warriors from other iwi but were unable or unwilling to break through Carey's government lines to reinforce the mainly Ngati Maniapoto and Tuhoe defenders.

=== Sale of land and subsequent gift to Government ===
After the 1864 defeat of the Waikato Kingitanga forces, Tamihana detached himself from the Kingitanga Movement. Ngati Haua had fought at the major battle at Rangiriri but in the post war confiscations lost very little land as, like Ngāi Te Rangi they had surrendered and cooperated with the government. The government confiscation line ran approximately north-south from the top of Pukemoremore Mountain, north along Valentines Road to Tauhei. The line is approximately 7.5 km west of Morrinsville town. The confiscated land was west of this line. They lost most of their land (east of this line) by "reckless selling" within a few years. By 1865 Tamihana had leased land to Josiah Firth an Auckland-based businessman who had explored the Matamata area before the war and attempted to buy land directly from Ngati Haua. By 1866 Firth had leased 55,000 acres and paid Ngati Haua up to 500 pounds per annum for leases. "The fern and bracken was burnt and soon in grassland and crops such as turnips." When Wiremu Tamihana died in 1866 Firth had a monument erected in his memory. On it was engraved:"The last words of Wiremu Tamihana were Tell Mr Firth that if he is willing he should abide here continually." By the 1870s many of the leases had been converted into freehold title after the Native Land Court had processed the titles. Firth paid a total of £12,000 ($1.8 million in 2013 terms using Reserve Bank calculator) for the land to Ngati Haua.

On 15 January 1870 Firth met Te Kooti at the monument to Tamihana on Ngati Haua land. The stated reason for the meeting was that Te Kooti wanted to be given land and left alone by the government. Te Kooti saw himself as the possible protector of the Eastern Waikato. Firth said he had come to listen - he had no power to negotiate. While in the area Te Kooti received two ammunition resupplies from supporters in the Coromandel Peninsula before moving on to attack Rotorua.

In 1876 the 4,825 acre Motumaoho Block was sold by Hohaia Igahiwi of Ngati Haua to Auckland business man Thomas Morrin. The block is just to the East of the confiscation line and includes the site of Morrinsville, named after the Morrin brothers. The Wairongomai gold field was discovered by Hone Werahiko in 1880. It was developed with the aid of a dual tramway to remove ore from a steep sided valley. The Te Aroha Hot Springs together with 8 hectares of land were given to the government by chief Te Mokena Hau (sometimes Hou) in 1882 on the condition that Māori could continue to use the hot water. The area, called the domain, was developed into a government run spa town with attractive gardens by 1883. The spa has been modernised and is open to the public.

=== Settlement with Government ===
Between 2010 and 2012 there were two competing Ngāti Hauā organisations who wished to negotiate with the crown. In April 2012 they were both dissolved and a new united Ngāti Hauā organisation established. Five meetings were held at which 214 people attended, 158 being listed. The new Ngati Haua Iwi Trust was elected.

Ngāti Hauā settled their historical claims over raupatu through the Waikato-Tainui Raupatu settlement in 1995, and other land loss (through the Native Land Court and the Public Works Act) with the Crown in July 2013. The Ngāti Haua Iwi Trust and Minister for Treaty Negotiations Christopher Finlayson signed a settlement in Morrinsville which included $13 million, administrative rights over 700 hectares of land, and established a Tumuaki (Kingmaker) Endowment fund in recognition of the historical role of Wiremu Tamihana, the kingmaker, in establishing the Kingitanga.

== See also ==
- List of Māori iwi
