= Ngāti Korokī Kahukura =

Māori iwi (tribe) in Aotearoa (New Zealand)

- Iwi (tribe) in Māoridom
- Rohe (region): Waikato
- Waka (canoe): Tainui

Ngāti Korokī Kahukura is a Māori iwi of the Maungatautari area in the North Island of New Zealand. It was formed by the coming together of two related hapū, Ngāti Korokī and Ngāti Kahukura. It has historic affiliations with Ngāti Raukawa (Ngati Korokī) and Ngāti Hauā (Ngāti Kahukura) – some members identify as Ngāti Raukawa. It is associated with the Tainui canoe.

Its primary marae is Maungatautari, on the north side of the Mount Maungatautari. Its secondary marae, Pōhara, on the south side of the mountain, is the host of a poukai, one of the annual hui of the Kīngitanga.

== See also ==
- List of Māori iwi
