= Maniapoto =

New Zealand Māori rangatira (chief)

Places in the life of Maniapoto
1 Kāwhia
2 Waiponga
3 Ōngārahu
4 Te Kūiti
5 Hikurangi
6 Waitomo Caves
7 Pukeroa

Maniapoto was a Māori rangatira (chieftain) of Ngāti Raukawa in the Tainui tribal confederation from the Waikato region, New Zealand, and the founding ancestor of the Ngāti Maniapoto iwi.

Initially, he based himself at Waiponga in the Mohoao-nui swamp, near modern Ōtorohanga. After the death of his father, Rereahu, he defeated his older half-brother, Te Ihinga-a-rangi, in a battle for pre-eminence. He based himself in the region of modern Te Kūiti for a time, repulsing attacks on this area by Hou-taketake and the Ngāti Taki hapū of Ngāti Tama. Then he returned to Mohoao-nui, settling at Hikurangi, from which he repulsed a large invasion by Wairangi of Ngāti Raukawa. In his old age, he lived in the Waitomo Caves and died peacefully at a meeting of the whole iwi at Pukeroa. He probably lived in the seventeenth century.

== Life ==
Maniapoto was the second-born son of Rereahu, who was a direct descendant of Hoturoa (the commander of the Tainui canoe), and his first wife, Rangi-ānewa, daughter of Tamāio. His mother was Hine-au-pounamu, Rereahu’s second wife, whose parents were Tū-a-tangiroa of Tainui and a daughter of the Ngāti-Hā chief Hā-kūhā-nui. Maniapoto had an older half-brother, Te Ihinga-a-rangi, and five younger brothers (Matakore, Tū-whakahekeao, Tūrongo-tapu-ārau, Te Io-wānanga or Te Āio-wānanga, Kahu-ariari), and two sisters (Kinohaku and Te Rongorito), many of whom are the ancestors of hapū (sub-tribes) of Ngāti Maniapoto. Maniapoto and his younger brothers grew up at Kāwhia.

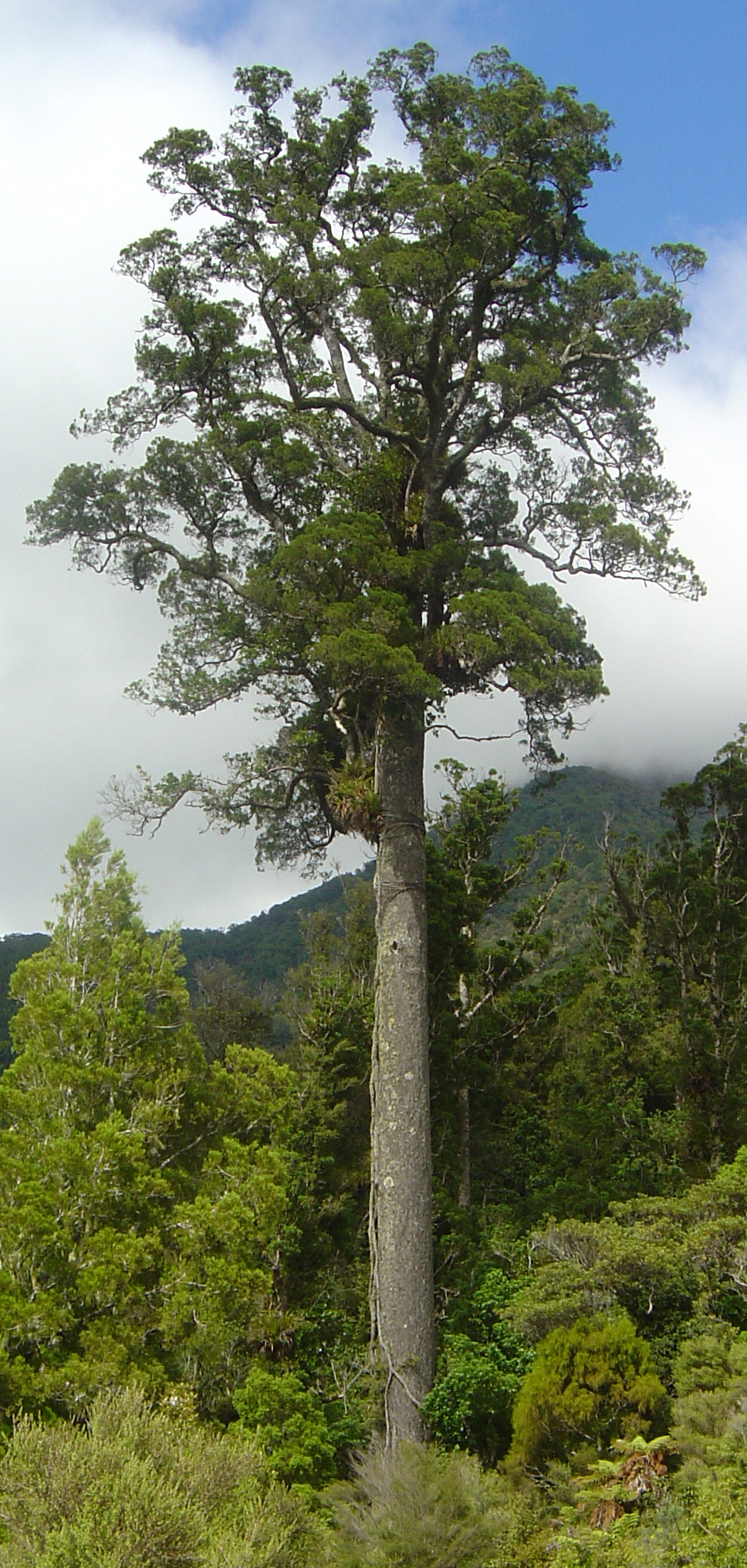
A mature kahikatea tree.

Maniapoto and Matakore both decided to settle at Waiponga on the north bank of the Waipā River a little to the east of Ōtorohanga, in the Mohoao-nui swamp. When Matakore went looking for a tree to use as the tāhuhu (ridge beam) of his house, he found a tall kahikatea at Mangawhero which he chopped down and brought to Waiponga, but Maniapoto advised him that its length meant that it was in danger of splitting and advised him to cut it shorter. Then Maniapoto went into the forest and chopped down a taller kahikatea for himself, so that he would have the larger house. Matakore's house was called Mata-keretū and Maniapoto's was called Mata-whaiora. As of 1898, the foundations of these houses were still visible.

=== Conflict with Te Ihinga-a-rangi ===
When Rereahu was on his death-bed he decided to give his mana to Maniapoto, rather than Te Ihinga-a-rangi, because he thought the younger brother had proven himself a better leader. Therefore, he told Te Ihinga-a-rangi to go to the tuahu (altar) and perform rituals, promising to pass his mana to him when he returned. While he was away, he called Maniapoto to him, covered his head in red ochre and instructed him to bite the crown of his head, passing the chiefly mana to him. Maniapoto objected, but Rereahu declared that Te Ihinga-a-rangi was illegitimate in some way. Pei Te Hurinui Jones suggests that this was because Rereahu already planned to marry Hine-pounamu when Te Ihinga-a-rangi was conceived and/or because Hine-moana was genealogically senior to Te Ihinga-a-rangi’s mother Rangi-ānewa. Maniapoto accepted the mana and by the time Te Ihinga-a-rangi returned, Rereahu was dead.

One of the guests who came from Kāwhia for Rereahu's tangihanga (funeral) was Tū-tarawa, who was the brother of Maniapoto's mother and whose son was married to Te Ihinga-a-rangi's great-granddaughter, Hine-Whatihua. He visited Te Ihinga-a-rangi’s settlement at Ōngārahu, and Te Ihinga-a-rangi served him a meal of bird-meat, giving Tū-tarawa the worse portion (the heads), while keeping the rest for himself. Te Inhinga-a-rangi indicated that he intended to murder Maniapoto. After this, Tū-tarawa visited Maniapoto's house, Hikurangi, at Mohoao-nui, a little to the northwest. Maniapoto also served his uncle bird-meat, but gave him the better portion, so he told Maniapoto about Te Ihinga-a-rangi's intentions.

Maniapoto told Tū-tarawa to return to Te Ihinga-a-rangi and tell him that Maniapoto had decided to abandon Mohoao-nui and settle somewhere in the east. Then Maniapoto and his people left the village, travelled east for a way before circling around and hiding on the river bank to the west of the village. Thinking that the village had been abandoned, Te Ihinga-a-rangi brought a group up to settle there and was ambushed. Most of Te Ihinga-a-rangi's people were killed, but he was captured alive and brought to Maniapoto, who spat on his head, shaming Te Ihinga-a-rangi and securing his own pre-eminence, after which Te Ihinga-a-rangi went into exile.

=== Conflict with Hou-taketake ===
Places in the conflicts with Hou-taketake and Ngāti Taki
1 Taupiri-o-rangi
2 Pata-oneone
3 Pātohe
4 Mōtaki-ora

Subsequently, Maniapoto resettled at Taupiri-o-te-rangi on the Mangaokewa Stream (a tributary of the Mangapu River on the southern edge of modern Te Kūiti). Another chieftain, Hou-taketake (or Hou-takitaki) came to the region from Mōkau Falls and settled at Pata-oneone, about 1500 metres to the west. He then established another fortress to the southeast at Pātohe (or Mau-uka). Maniapoto did not perceive Hou-taketake as a threat, so he let him do this, but Hou-taketake concluded that Maniapoto was afraid of him and started to antagonise him and his people.

At the time of the kumara harvest, some of Maniapoto’s people encountered some of Hou-taketake’s people carrying a log, which they said was going to be the tāhuhu (‘ridge beam’) for a kumara pit. But then one of the men added that the log was a rib of Maniapoto’s father Rereahu. When Maniapoto heard this he sent his men to steal the log and Hou-taketake was so angry that he led a raiding party over to Taupiri-o-te-rangi in order to attack Maniapoto.

Maniapoto happened to be having sex with his new wife Papa-rauwhare when Hou-taketake attacked and by the time he emerged, Hou-taketake was already in front of his house. Maniapoto knelt down with his taiaha spear on the ground in front of him, but Hou-taketake came forward and challenged him to single combat. Maniapoto did not respond, so Hou-taketake came up and started insulting him. Then Maniapoto threw gravel and sand in Hou-taketake’s eyes, blinding him, grabbed him and threw him on the ground. He bit him on his head, lowering his mana. Maniapoto granted the honour of killing Hou-taketake to his nephew, Tangaroa-kino. Hou-taketake’s men fled, but Maniapoto chased them down and killed them all. After this, Maniapoto returned to Mohoao-nui.

=== Conflict with Ngāti Taki and Tuakina ===
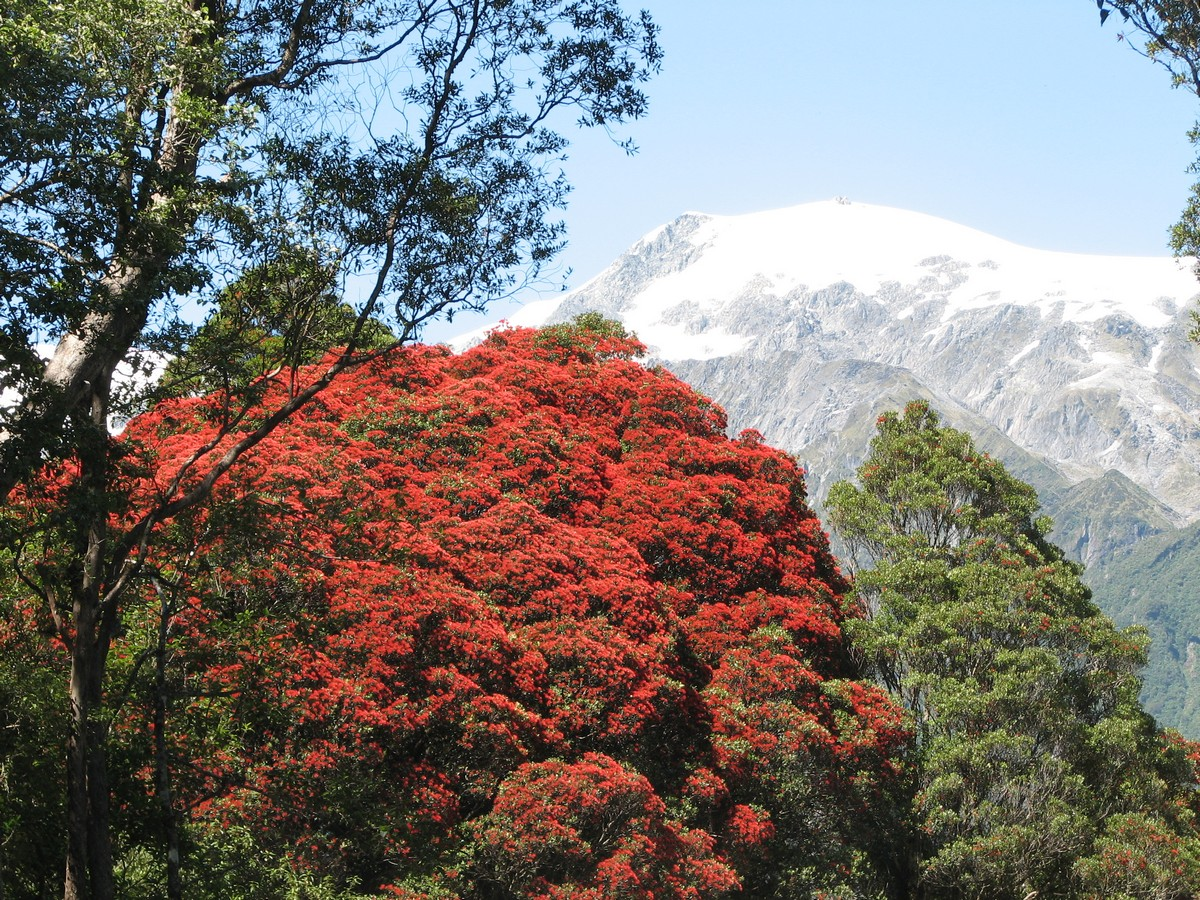
A rātā tree in flower.

Maniapoto’s son, Rōrā, married Kura-mōnehu of Ngāti Hia and settled at Mōtaki-ora, to the north of Te Kūiti. She fell out with Rōrā, went off to visit her family in Mōkau, and returned with a group of Ngāti Taki (a hapū of Ngāti Tama). The fact that she served the best food to a member of this group, Tuakina, led Rōrā to suspect that Kura-mōnehu had had sex with him and during an argument, she revealed that she had, so he murdered Tuakina. Te Matapihi says that the Rōrā murdered Kura-mōnehu’s brothers, rather than her lover. The rest of Ngāti Taki fled the village and set themselves up in a fort at Tihi-mānuka, near Hou-taketake’s old settlement of Pata-oneone. One of the men Te Heru was sent back to Mōtaki-ora and spoke to Kura-mōnehu, who told him that she was living in fear of Rōrā. He told her to keep Rōrā awake until dawn, then have sex with him and send him to sleep. When she had done this, she was to throw some gravel over the fence so that the Ngāti Taki would know that Rōrā was asleep. She carried out this plan and the Ngāti Taki managed to break into the village and killed Rōrā in his sleep.

As soon as he heard about this, Maniapoto gathered a war party, which arrived the following night and secretly surrounded Mōtaki-ora, where the Ngāti Taki were now staying. At dawn, Maniapoto's younger brother, Tū-whakahekeao climbed up a rātā tree which was covered in red flowers. Because he was wearing a red cloak, he was perfectly camouflaged and was able to see that the Ngāti Taki were going about their affairs and preparing food, completely unaware of the force that had gathered. This rātā tree was still visible as of 1870.

As soon as Tū-whakahekeao reported that the Ngāti Taki had sat down to eat, Maniapoto attacked, taking the Ngāti Taki completely by surprise. They were rapidly overpowered and captured. However, Maniapoto chose to let their chieftains, Te Heru and Pōwhero, go, because the murder of Rōrā had just and because they had not killed Rōrā’s son Tūtai-mārō. After this, Maniapoto again returned to the Mohoao-nui swamp, settling on a hill called Hikurangi.

=== Battle of Waiponga ===
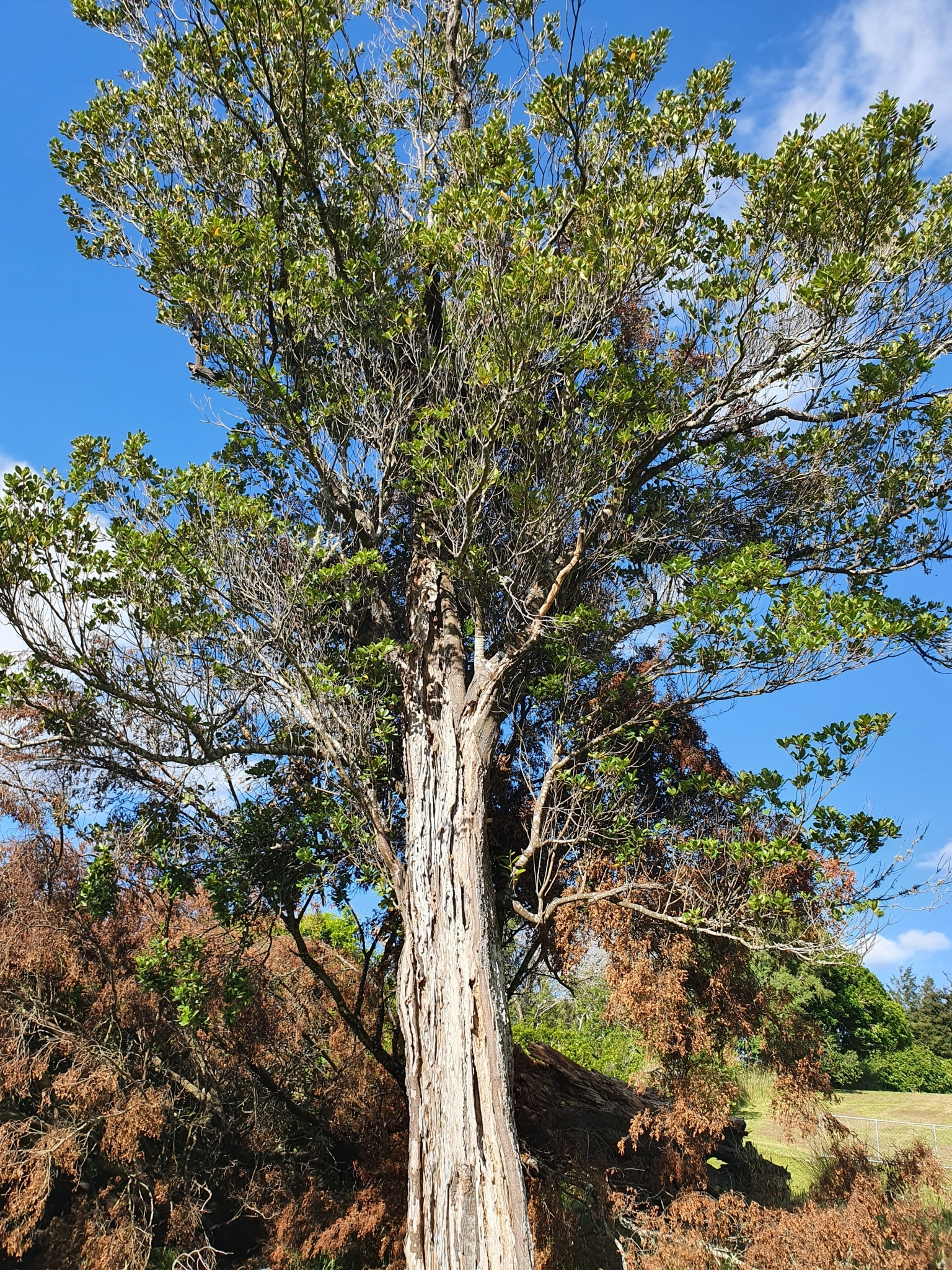
Hīnau tree.

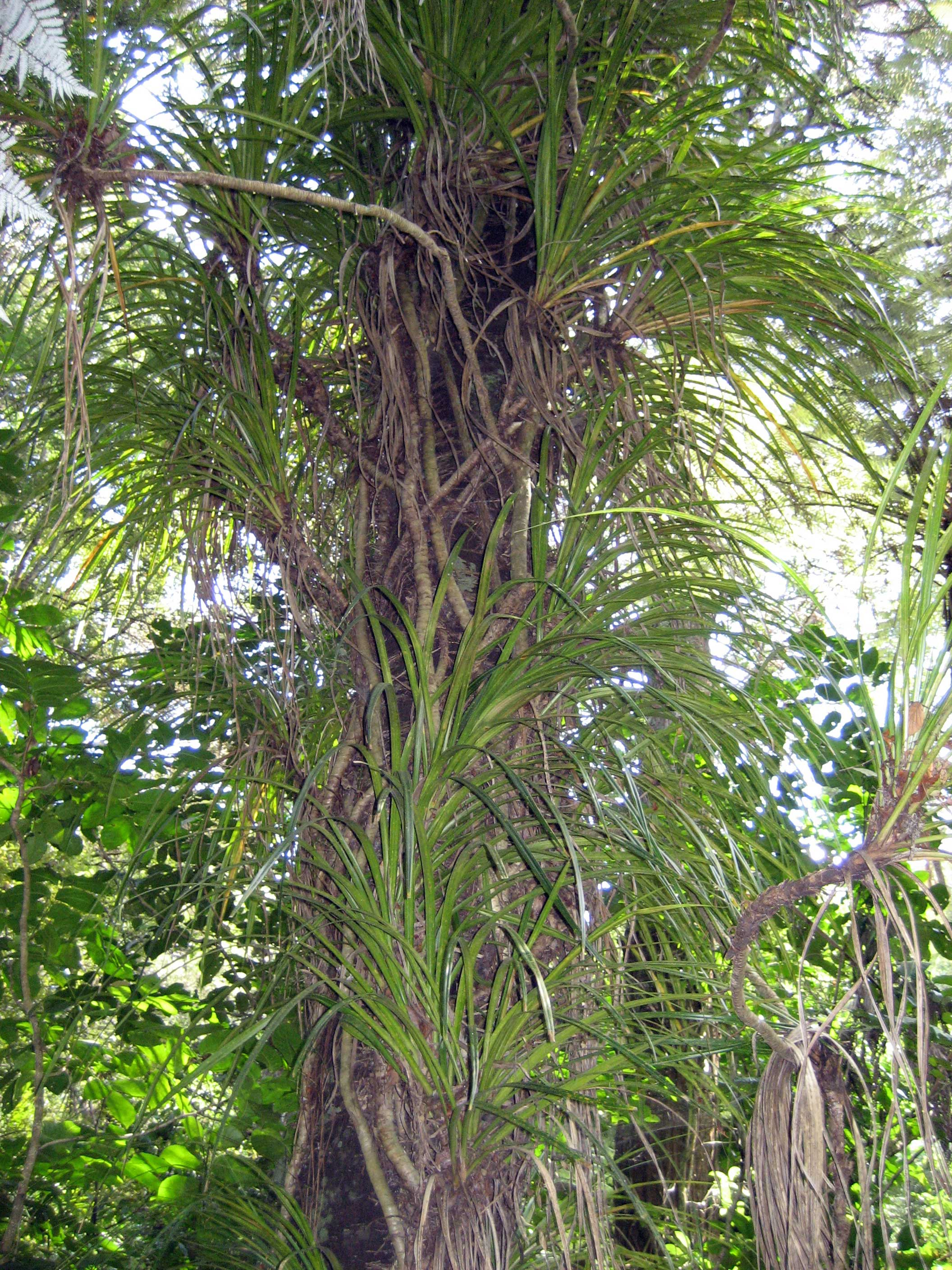
Kiekie vines climbing a tree.

Rangipare, the daughter of Maniapoto's sister, Kinohaku, was engaged to one of Takihiku's sons, Wairangi. On her journey to marry him, she stopped at the Ngāti Takihiku village at Mount Whare-puhunga, where she met Maniapoto's second son, Tū-taka-moana. The two instantly fell in love and began a sexual relationship, even though, as first cousins, this was considered incestuous. The pair eloped, settling secretly in a hīnau tree at Mangawhero (near Otewa). For three months, no one knew where the couple had gone. Wairangi set out to search for his bride, but when he visited Maniapoto at Hikurangi, he was told that she had not been seen there.

Eventually, however, an old man called Te Wana, who was out cutting kiekie in order to make an eel trap, happened upon the couple. He told them that Maniapoto supported them and that Wairangi had come looking for them. They gave him the pounamu earring, Ōrua-hinewai, which had been a gift from Maniapoto to Rangipare. When Te Wana returned to Hikurangi wearing the earring, Maniapoto recognised it and nearly killed him, but Te Wana was able to tell him the news and was then sent to bring Tū-taka-moana and Rangipare back to Hikurangi, where Maniapoto allowed them couple to marry. He said to his son, "marry your wife as utu ('repayment') for your neck", which has become proverbial.

When Wairangi heard about this he gathered a war party of nine hundred men from Ngāti Takihiku and Ngāti Whakatere, and came to attack. At Kārea-nui on the south bank of the Waipā River he burnt Ngāti Maniapoto's kumara storage pits. When Maniapoto's brother, Tū-whakahekeao, saw the smoke rising and despaired, Maniapoto said "Never mind, the five remain to produce food," but he responded, "Wrong! It is food that lets children be called children," so Maniapoto agreed to lead out a force of three hundred and seventy to confront Wairangi, making base near Kārea-nui at Waiponga. Wairangi's forces attacked Waiponga, but Maniapoto stayed still, leaping into action only when the enemy had breached the walls. Then he leapt up and made the first kill. The men of Ngāti Takihiku fled.

Tama-te-hura, the brother of Wairangi, and his wife Te Rongorito, Maniapoto's favourite sister, who lived at nearby Te Waka, were watching the battle from a distance. Tama-te-hura thought that his brother's side was winning and said "Āhahā! The days of the children of Maikuku-tara!" (Maikuku-tara was the mother of Tama-te-hura and Wairangi) but his wife replied "If the dust of battle moves northwards, these are the days of the sons of Maikuku-tara; if it moves south of Waipā they are the days of your in-laws." When this proved true, Tama-te-hura was so angry that he killed their child (his daughter Pare-whakaroro-uri according to Bruce Biggs or his son Huitao according to Hōri Wirihana) and ran off to Te Horanga, but Te Rongorito decided to follow him, so that her surviving child would not be considered a bastard.

As Maniapoto's forces pushed Wairangi's forces back, Maniapoto shouted out one of his most famous sayings, "Kei hewa ki Te Marae-o-hine" ("Do not desecrate Te Marae-o-hine"), meaning that his men should not kill the enemy while they remained on the north bank of the Waipā, where Te Marae-o-hine was located, but could kill any who were on the south bank. As Ngāti Maniapoto made kills they shouted out they shouted out the names of famous eel weirs, saying "Kākati-kūtehe is mine!", "Kete-onehea is mine!" and so on. Eventually, Maniapoto shouted out another famous saying, "Coward! Behold, mine! Your elder brother's is the fish of the morning!" (meaning that he had made the first kill).

This war provides the traditional foundation for the long-term animosity between Ngāti Maniapoto and Ngāti Takihiku.

=== Death ===
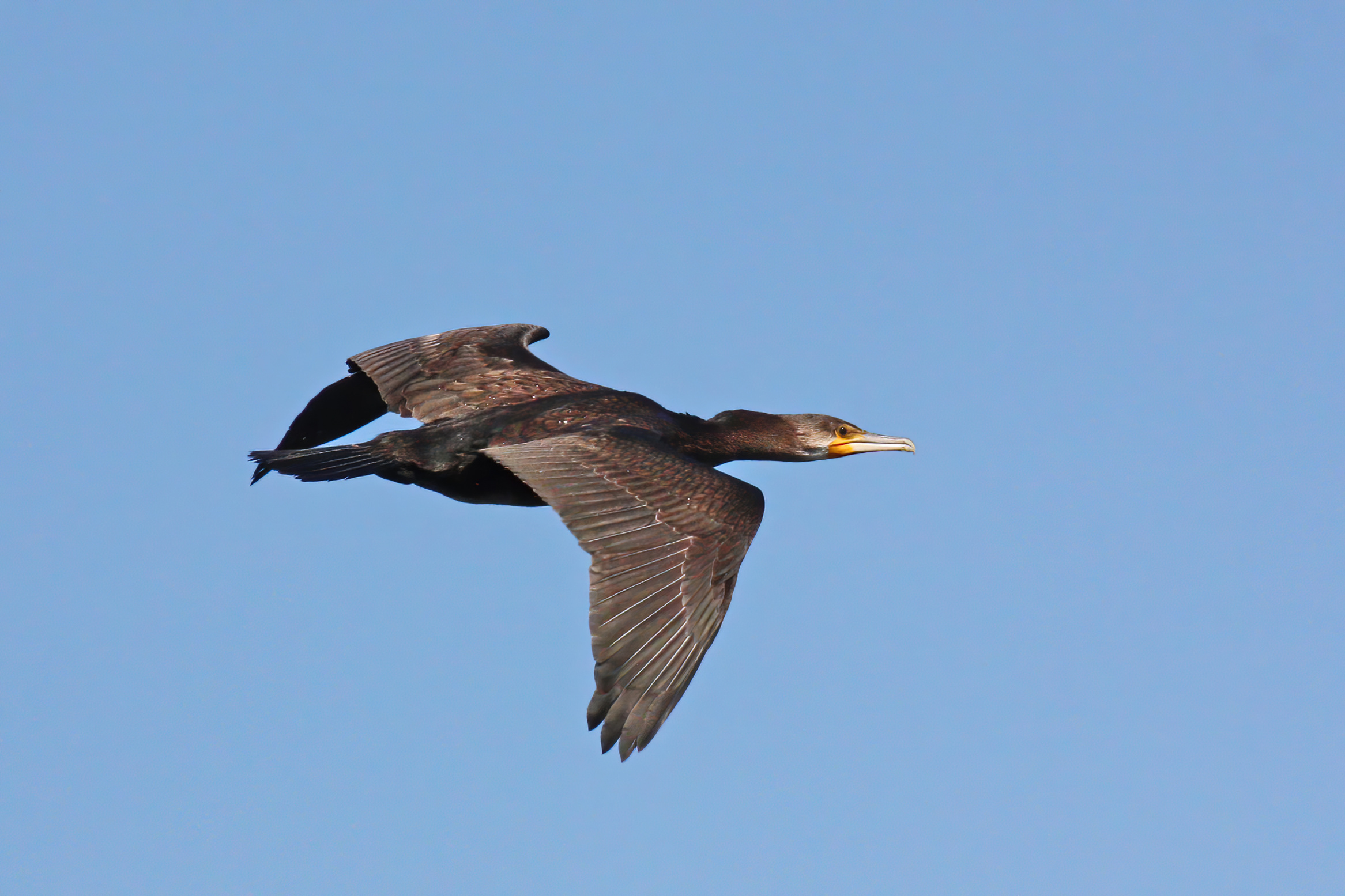
A kawau (‘cormorant’ or ‘black shag’) flying in a straight direction.

Maniapoto lived for many years without warfare, basing himself at Te Ana-uriuri (subsequently known as Te Ana-o-Maniapoto), one of the Waitomo Caves. When he was nearing death, he went to Pukeroa and had his brother-in-law, Tū-irirangi, gather the people for a hui. When the people had gathered, Maniapoto told them to perform the tū waewae haka (a war dance with weapons). He was not impressed with any of the groups’ performances except for that of his own family, led by his son Te Kawa-irirangi. When they performed he said, “kia mau tonu ki tēnā; kia mau ki te kawau-mārō” (‘stick to that, the straight-flying cormorant’), which has become a proverb – it refers to the way that a war party charges forward with determination. He died during the hui.

== Family ==
Maniapoto married several times. His first wife was Hine-mania, daughter of Te Rūeke, niece of Tū-pāhau and grand-daughter of Kaihamu, from the Kāwhia region. She was an extremely respected figure and the people of the tribe regularly reserved part of their catch for her when they went hunting, although Maniapoto himself resented this. They had one son:

- Te Kawa-irirangi, ancestor of the Ngāti Te Kanawa and Ngāti Paretekawa hapū of Ngāti Maniapoto.

Subsequently, Maniapoto married Hine-whatihua, the great-grand-daughter of his older brother Te Ihinga-a-rangi, who had previously been married to Ue-tarangore, son of Tū-tarawa and nephew of Maniapoto’s mother Hine-au-pounamu. They had one son:

- Tū-taka-moana, who eloped with his cousin Rangipare, daughter of Tū-irirangi and Kinohaku, with whom he had one son, Rangatahi, an ancestor of the Ngāti Urunumia and Ngāti Rangatahi hapū of Ngāti Maniapoto.

He also married Papa-rauwhare, daughter of Hine-whatihua and Ue-tarangore. They had one son:

- Rōrā, ancestor of the Ngāti Rōrā hapū of Ngāti Maniapoto.

== Sources ==
The story of Maniapoto’s conflict with Te Ihinga-a-rangi is recorded by Pei Te Hurinui Jones, based on oral accounts that he heard from unspecified Tainui elders. It was also cited by Ngāti Maniapoto elders during a conflict about the status of the Rereahu tribe within Ngāti Maniapoto in 2016.

The story of Maniapoto’s conflict with Hou-taketake was reported by Percy Smith in 1909, who attributes it to “old Rīhari of Mōkau and repeated by Pei Te Hurinui Jones, who also heard a version of it from Wehi-te-ringitanga of Ngāti Maniapoto, from Mangapēhi. It was also recounted by Te Naunau Hīkaka as evidence in a case before the Maori Land Court at Ōtorohanga on 15 December 1892.

The conflict with Ngāti Taki is reported by Pei Te Hurinui Jones, based on the oral account which he heard from Wehi-te-ringitana. It was also recounted by Te Naunau Hīkaka at the same court case in 1892 and by Te Matapihi at another court case on 14 December 1892.

The conflict with Ngāti Takihiku is reported by Bruce Biggs, based on an 1898 manuscript by Hari Wahanui of Ōtorohanga.

== Bibliography ==
- Jones, Pei Te Hurinui; Biggs, Bruce (2004). Ngā iwi o Tainui : nga koorero tuku iho a nga tuupuna = The traditional history of the Tainui people. Auckland [N.Z.]: Auckland University Press. ISBN 1869403312.
