= Rihi Puhiwahine Te Rangi-hirawea =

New Zealand composer

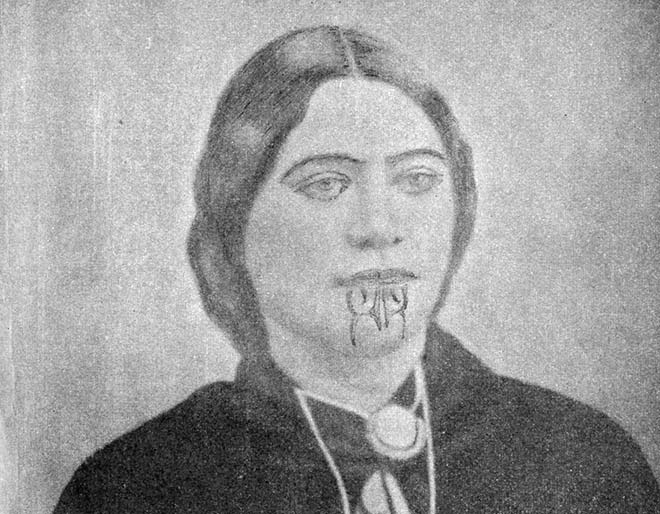
Puhiwahine

Rihi Puhiwahine Te Rangi-hirawea (c. 1816 – 18 February 1906) was a New Zealand composer of waiata. Of Māori descent, she identified with the Ngati Maniapoto and Ngati Tuwharetoa iwi. She was born in Taringamotu River, King Country, New Zealand.
