= Kinohaku =

Places in the life of Kinohaku
1 Kāwhia
2 Ngaku-raho
3 Te Rua-o-te-manu

Kinohaku was a Māori woman of the Ngāti Maniapoto tribe in New Zealand's Waikato region. She lived in the seventeenth century and is the eponymous ancestor of the Ngāti Kinohaku sub-tribe (hapū) of Ngāti Maniapoto.

== Life ==
Kinohaku was a daughter of Rereahu, through whom she was a direct male-line descendant of Hoturoa, the captain of the Tainui canoe, and his second wife Hine-au-pounamu, also a descendant of Hoturoa. She had one older half-brother, Te Ihinga-a-rangi, five full brothers, Maniapoto, Matakore, Tū-whakahekeao, Tūrongo-tapu-ārau, Te Io-wānanga / Te Āio-wānanga. Two full sister Kahuariari and Te Rongorito.

Kinohaku and her full siblings were raised in region around Kāwhia. Subsequently, they settled along the Waipā River and the Manga-o-kewa Stream, with a central hub at Te Kūiti.

=== Marriage to Tū-irirangi ===
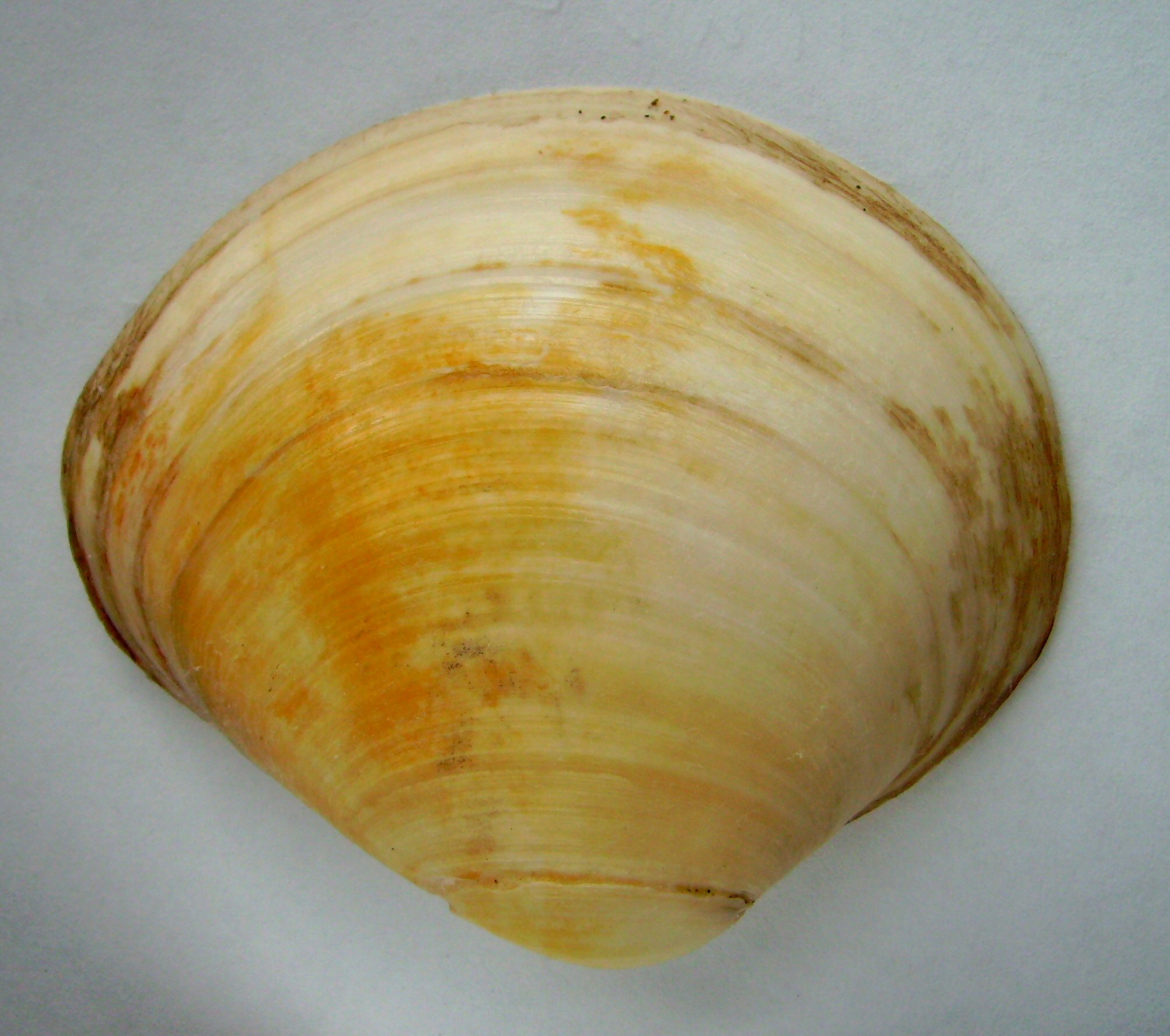
A pipi shell.

Kinohaku married Tū-irirangi, who was her cousin on both sides, since his father, Huiao son of Whāita, was a great-grandson of Rereahu's brother Kurawari, while his mother Māpau-inuhia was the sister of Hine-au-Pounamu's father Tū-a-tangiroa. The amount of food gathered by Tū-irirangi and his tribe for the wedding feast was enormous and remains a source of mana for the descendants of the marriage, Ngāti Kinohaku. In response to this, some Tainui people joked that Kinohaku had been “bought with pipi.”

After the marriage Tū-irirangi and Kinohaku settled at Ngaku-raho, a rocky pinnacle near Hangatiki and very near the final base of Kinohaku's brother Maniapoto at Te Ana-a-Maniapoto / Te Ana-a-uriuri. They had three sons and one daughter together.

- Whakapau-tangaroa
- Kāhui-tangaroa
- Tangaroa-kino
- Rangipare, who was meant to marry Wairangi, but eloped with her cousin Tū-taka-moana, son of Maniapoto, with whom she had one son, Rangatahi, an ancestor of the Ngāti Urunumia hapu of Ngāti Maniapoto.

After many years, Hinerangi visited Ngaku-raho, while she was fleeing the murder of her father, Mania-takamaiwaho. Tū-irirangi developed a desire to marry her, but she refused. However, Kinohaku was furious that her husband had planned to marry another woman, so she had an affair with Tū-irirangi's half-brother Pai-ariki. When Tū-irirangi found out, he went to Pai-ariki's village, Te Rua-o-te-manu near Te Kūiti, intending to murder him, but was unable to do the deed. Afterwards, he went away to Kāwhia, where he remarried and had another son.

=== Sources ===
Pei Te Hurinui Jones and Leslie Kelly give accounts of Kinohaku's life, based on oral traditions that they heard from Whare Hotu of Oparure (an 8th generation descendant of Kinohaku).

== Ngāti Kinohaku ==
Marae of Ngāti Kinohaku
1 Te Kauae marae
2 Marokopa marae
3 Mōkau Kohunui marae
4 Mōtītī marae
5 Te Waipatoto

The Ngāti Kinohaku hapu of Ngāti Maniapoto are descendants of Kinohaku. They have the following marae (in alphabetical order), most of which they share with various other hapu of Ngāti Maniapoto:

1. Te Kauae marae and Te Kauae o Niu Tereni wharenui, in Hangatiki, shared with Ngāti Huiao, Ngāti Peehi, and Ngāti Te Kanawa
2. Marokopa marae and Miromiro i te Pō wharenui, in Marokopa, shared with Ngāti Peehi, and Ngāti Te Kanawa
3. Mōkau Kohunui marae and Ko Tama Tāne wharenui, in Piopio, shared with Ngāti Apakura and Ngāti Waiora
4. Mōtītī marae and Ko te Hungaiti / Hapainga wharenui, in Te Kūiti, shared with Ngāti Putaitemuri and Ngāti Tauhunu
5. Te Waipatoto marae and Waipatoto and Waipatoto Tuarua wharenui, in Oparure

== Bibliography ==
- Jones, Pei Te Hurinui; Biggs, Bruce (2004). Ngā iwi o Tainui : nga koorero tuku iho a nga tuupuna = The traditional history of the Tainui people. Auckland [N.Z.]: Auckland University Press. ISBN 1869403312.
- Kelly, Leslie G. (1934). "Ngaku-raho Pa, Hangatika". Journal of the Polynesian Society. Vol. 43, no. 170. pp. 101–105.
