= Wairangi =

Māori rangatira (chieftain)

Places in the life of Wairangi.
1 Maungatautari
2 Ātiamuri / Pōhatu-roa
3 Ruru-nui
4 Te Āea
5 Waiponga

Wairangi was a Māori rangatira (chieftain) of the Ngāti Takihiku hapū of the Ngāti Raukawa iwi in the Tainui tribal confederation from the Waikato region, New Zealand and the ancestor of the Ngāti Wairangi hapū. He probably lived in the mid-seventeenth century.

== Life ==
Wairangi was a son of Takihiku and brother of Tama-te-hura, Upoko-iti, and Pipito. His grandfather Raukawa, son of Tūrongo and Māhina-a-rangi, was the founder of Ngāti Raukawa and a direct descendant of Hoturoa, the captain of the Tainui.

=== Ngāti Raukawa–Ngāti Kahu-pungapunga War ===
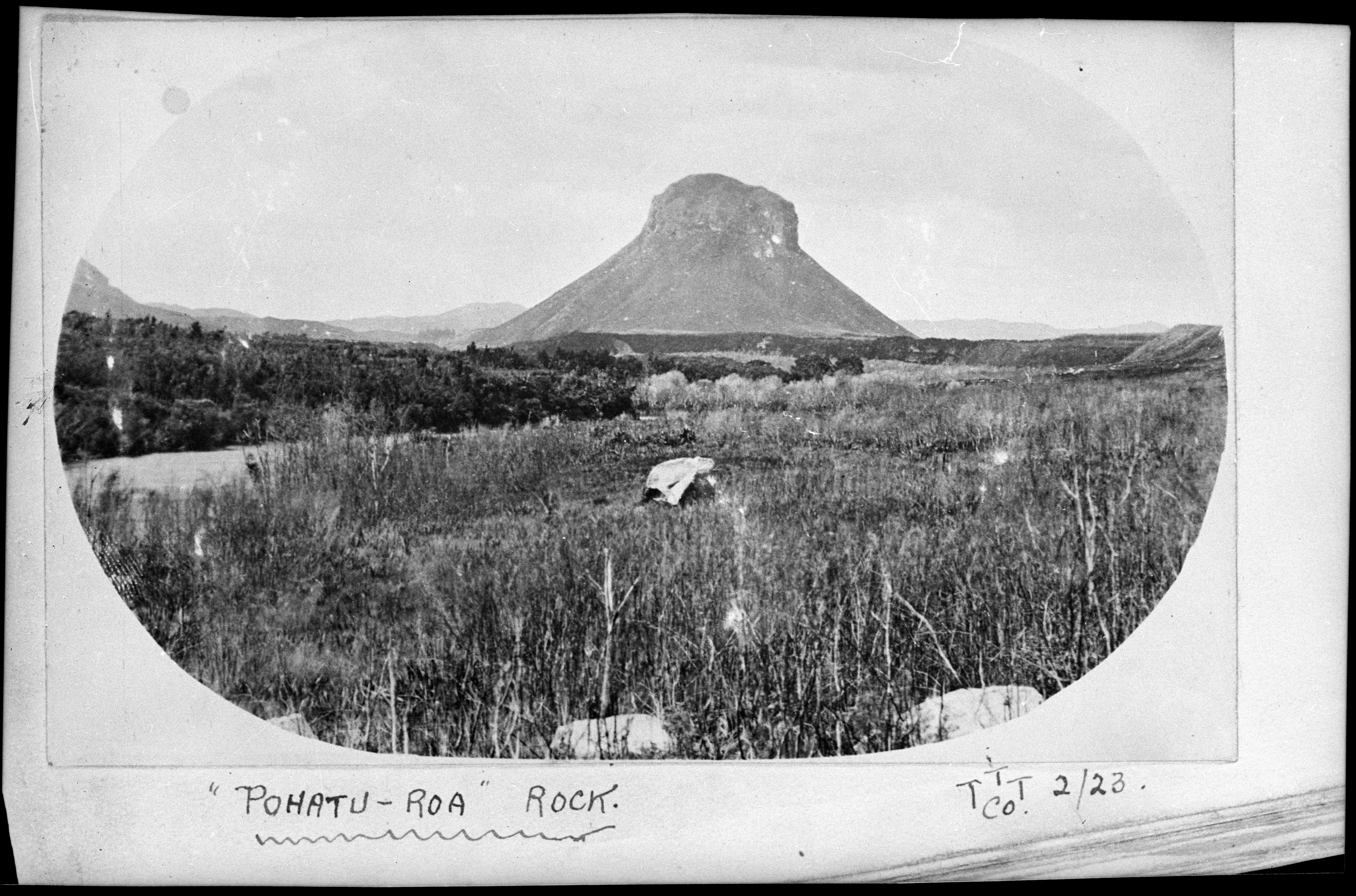
Pōhatu-roa, as photographed by Albert Percy Godber in February 1923.

Wairangi joined Whāita in his war against Ngāti Kahu-pungapunga, in which they eliminated Ngāti Kahu-pungapunga and seized the upper reaches of the Waikato River, between Putāruru and Ātiamuri. After the initial assault on the Ngāti Kahu-pungapunga settlements south of Maungatautari, Wairangi and Upoko-iti led half of the war party south on the west side of the Waikato River. They passed Te Wawa, killed the rangatira Whakahi at Te Pae-o-Turawau, and killed Korouamaku at Te Ngautuku, near Ātiamuri.

The last of the Ngāti Kahu-pungapunga made their stand at Pōhatu-roa, a hill just west of Ātiamuri, which was the base of their allies, the Ngāti Hotu. Whāita and Wairangi's war-parties reunited and surrounded the hill. The two forces clashed repeatedly, but eventually hunger sapped the defenders' strength and they were unable to deflect the Ngāti Raukawa assault, which captured the chieftain Hikaraupi and the mountain.

After this, Wairangi settled the portion of Ngāti Kahu-pungapunga's lands south of Whakamaru, making his base at Ruru-nui, near Whare-puhanga. His descendants, Ngāti Wairangi, still live in the area and now share Mōkai marae with a number of other hapū.

=== Tupeteka and Parewhete ===
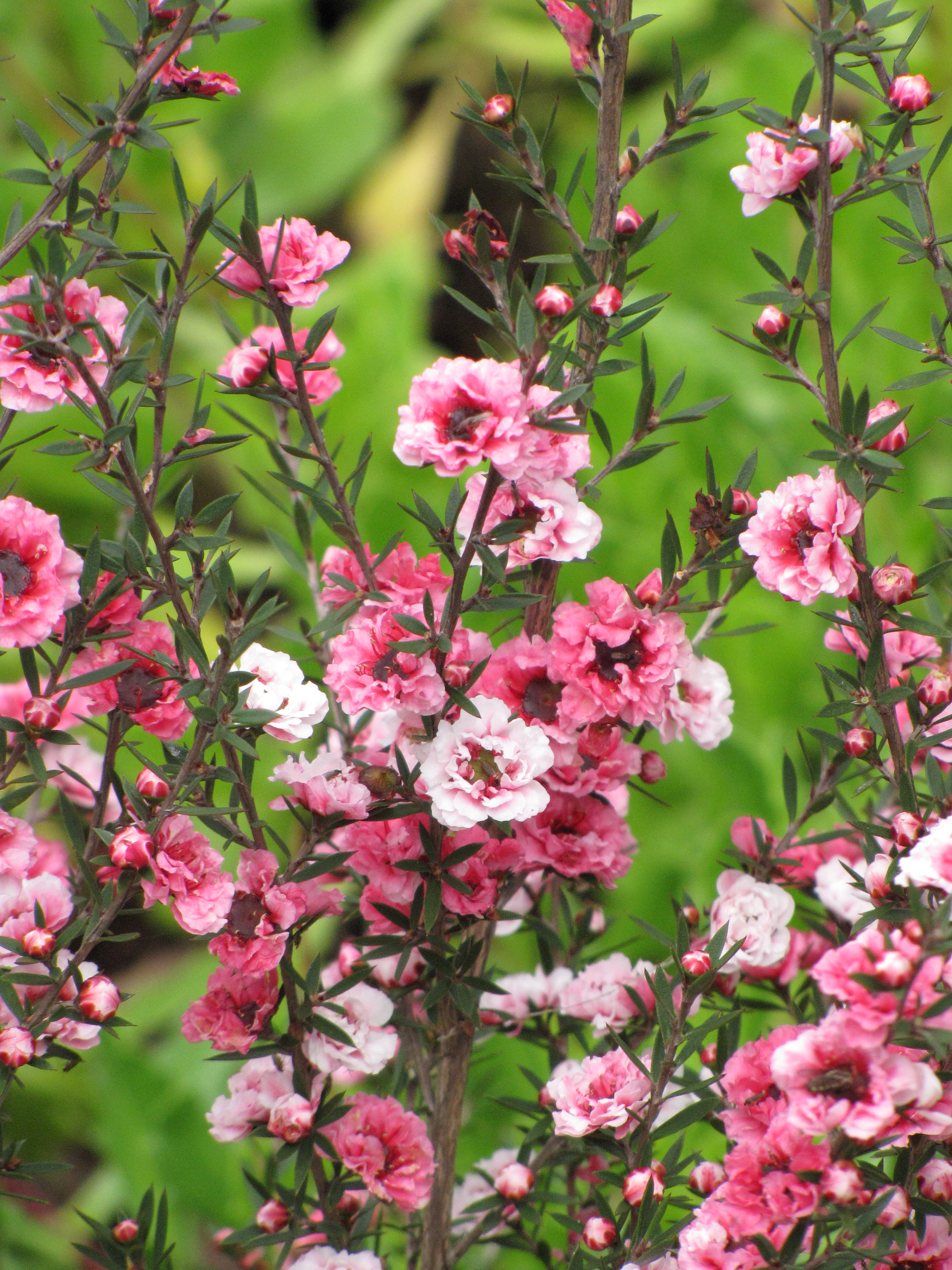
Red and white mānuka flowers

While Wairangi was out hunting birds at Kāwhia, Ruru-nui was visited by Tupeteka, a rangatira of Ngāti Maru from Te Āea in the Waihou River valley near Te Aroha. Wairangi's wife Parewhete had sex with him and Wairangi realised this because when he returned the food that Parewhete served him was not properly cooked, or because his other wife, Puroku had noticed some of Parewhete's kokowai rouge on Tupeteka's cheek. Therefore, he beat her and she fled to Tupeteka's village.

During this flight, Parewhete painted some of her kokowai on a mānuka tree at a place now called Mānuka-tutahi (mānuka flowers are usually white, but sometimes pink or red). She left one of her cloaks at Āniwaniwa, where she crossed the Waikato. A red cliff face by the Waikato River or at Pari-kararangaranga near Matamata is said to derive from this flight, either because when Parewhete stopped to wash she left her maro ('skirt') on the rock and the blood from her menstruation turned it red, or because she painted more kokowai on the cliff. These traces allowed people from Ruru-nui to work out that Parewhete had gone to Te Āea.

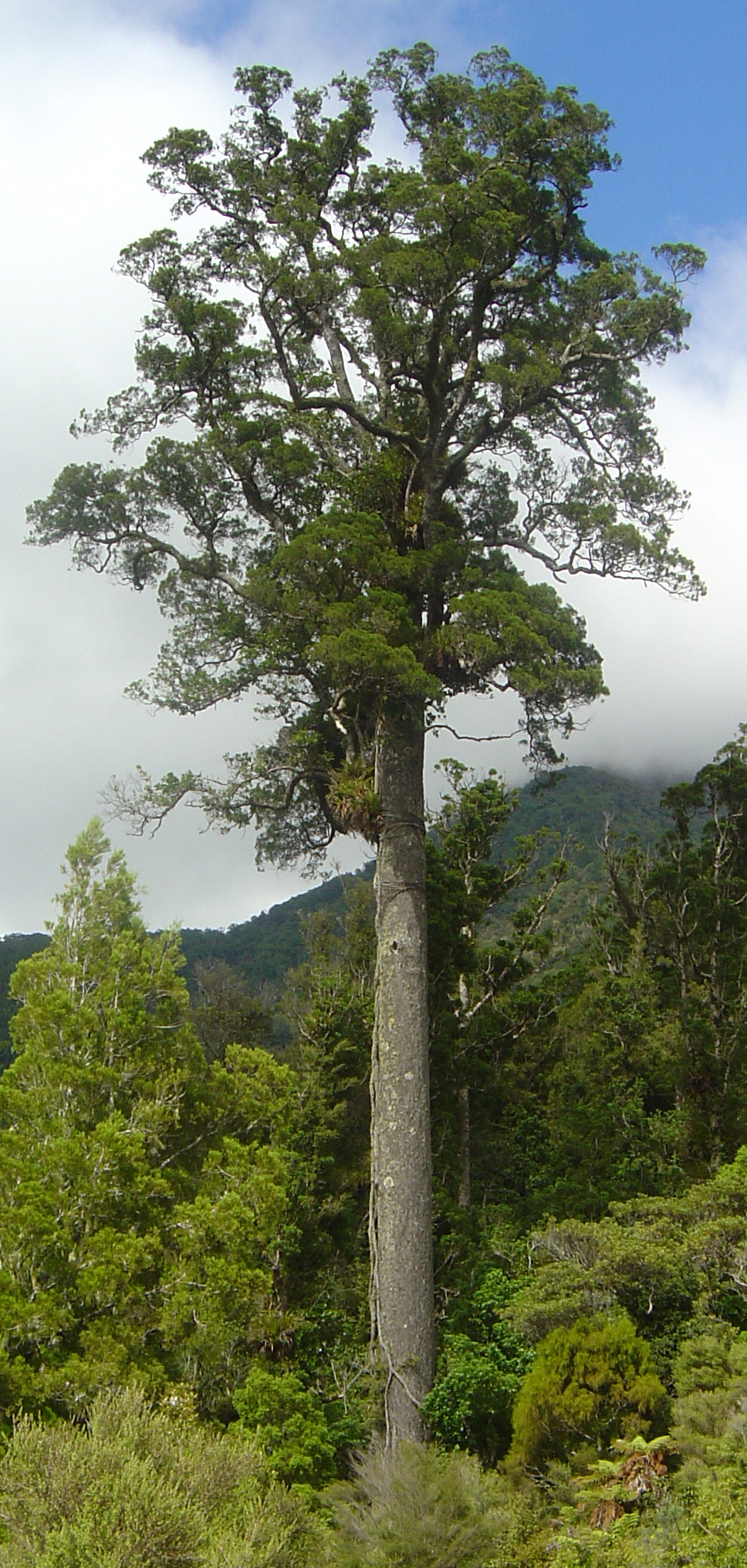
A kahikatea tree

When Tupeteka refused to return Parewhete, Wairangi gathered a war-party of 140 men along with his brothers Tama-te-hura, Upoko-iti, and Pipito. When they arrived at Te Āea, they were welcomed into the village and performed the tangi ('ceremonial weeping') on the marae. They were let into a giant wharau guesthouse. According to Te Rangi Hīroa his suspicions were aroused by the fact that the posts of the wharau were made of whole trunks of kahikatea - far sturdier than required for construction. Meanwhile, Tupeteka summoned a war-party of Ngāti Maru from the Hauraki Gulf.

For the first two days, the visitors were given only a meagre amount of food - one kūmara for two on the first day and one each on the second. On the third day, they heard Tupeteka's men slaughtering kurī dogs for food, carrying eels into the village, and bringing firewood, as if for a feast. In fact the dogs were being beaten, not slaughtered, and there was only one eel, which was being carried past repeatedly. The ovens were being prepared in order to cook Wairangi and his party.

However, Parewhete had realised that Tupeteka planned to kill Wairangi and his men. Te Rangi Hīroa says that she went to the wharau, weeping, lay down on Wairangi's lap and cut her arms so that the blood flowed over him. This made him tapu so that he could not be eaten. As she did this, she sang "Why did you come with the small basket of Traveller, and not stay away with the large basket of Stay-at-home?" Pei Te Hurinui Jones reports the same lament, but says that it was a cryptic warning that she uttered when Wairangi first arrived.

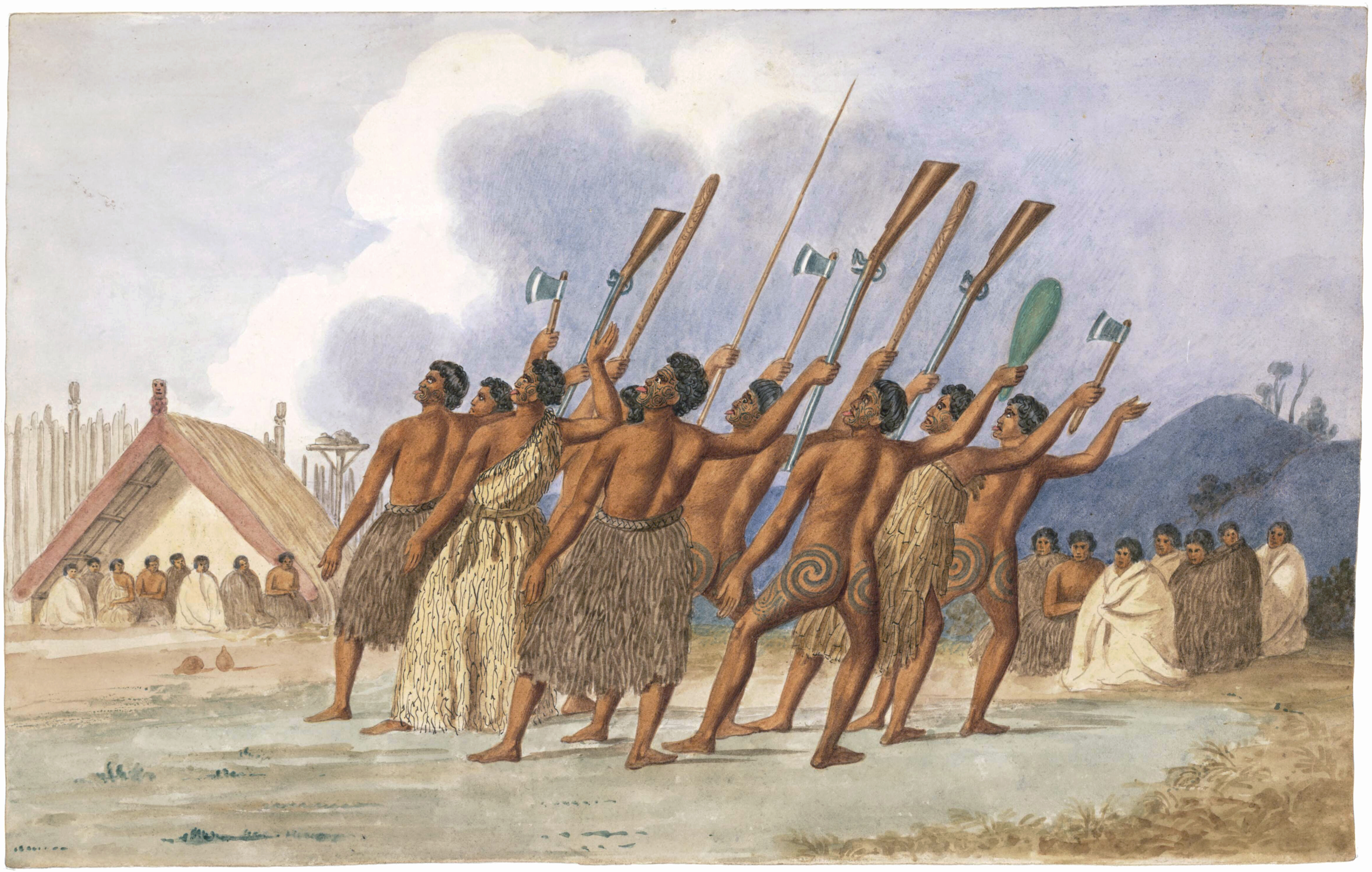
An 1845 painting of Māori men performing the haka

Wairangi sent his slave, Matamata out to investigate and he discovered Tupeteka's plan. To avoid being killed, the group decided that they would offer to perform a haka and when they reached a set word they would suddenly attack Tupetaka. After some disagreement between the brothers it was agreed that it would be Wairangi who would shout the word at the beginning of his panepane ('verse'). Matamata was sent to tell Parewhete to hide on the roof.

When they performed the haka in the morning, the entire village gathered to watch. Wairangi's men had hidden their weapons under their skirts and (according to Pei Te Hurinui Jones) Matamata was stationed next to Tupeteka, ready to grab him when the signal was given. Te Rangi Hīroa and Pei Te Hurinui Jones record the words of the haka. Tupeteka realised what was happening, but too late; Matamata grabbed him and Wairangi killed him with his taiaha spear. Wairangi's men killed everyone in the village, demolished the houses and threw the timbers into the Waihou River. The war-party that had been coming to aid Tupeteka saw this and fled. Then Wairangi returned to Ruru-nui with Parewhete.

=== Battle of Waiponga ===
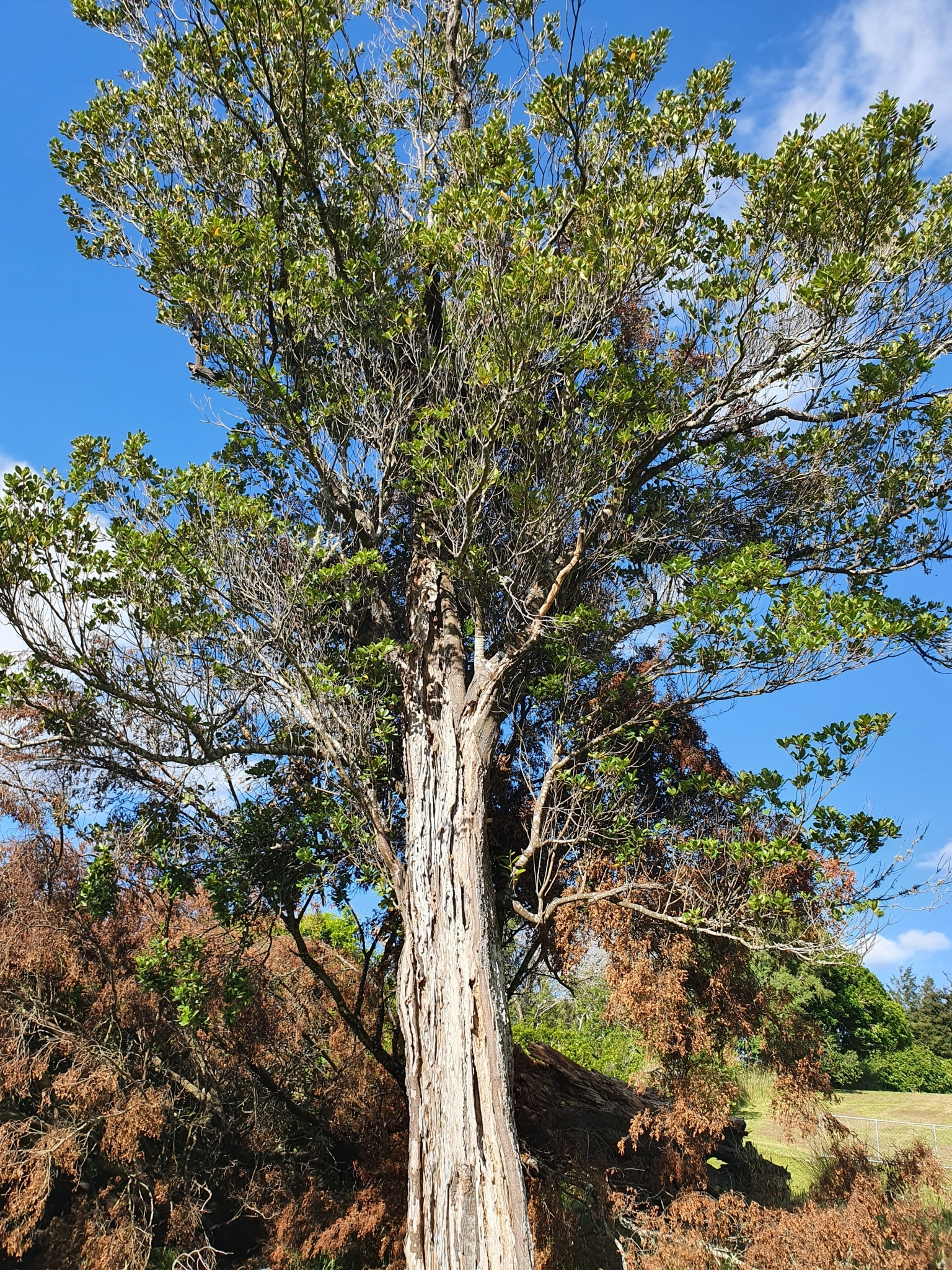
A hīnau tree

Wairangi was engaged to Rangipare, the daughter of Tū-irirangi and Kinohaku. However, on her journey to marry him, she met her cousin, Tū-taka-moana, a son of Maniapoto at Mount Whare-puhunga. The two instantly fell in love and began a sexual relationship, even though, as first cousins, this was considered incestuous. The pair eloped, settling secretly in a hīnau tree at Mangawhero (near Otewa). For three months, no one knew where the couple had gone. Wairangi set out to search for his bride, but when he visited Maniapoto at Hikurangi, he was told that she had not been seen there.

Eventually, however, Rangipare and Tū-taka-moana came to Hikurangi and Maniapoto allowed them to marry. When Wairangi heard about this he gathered a war party of nine hundred men from Ngāti Takihiku and Ngāti Whakatere, and came to attack. At Kārea-nui on the south bank of the Waipā River he burnt Ngāti Maniapoto's kumara storage pits. This goaded Maniapoto into leading out a force of three hundred and seventy to confront Wairangi, making base near Kārea-nui at Waiponga. Wairangi's forces attacked Waiponga, but Maniapoto stayed still, even as Wairangi's forces breached the walls of the fortress. Only then did he leap up and made the first kill. Wairangi and his men fled.

This war provides the traditional foundation for the long-term animosity between Ngāti Maniapoto and Ngāti Takihiku.

== Family ==
Wairangi married Parewhete, who was descended from the Ngāti Tūwharetoa ancestor, Tia. With her he had one son, Hingaia, from whom there were further descendants. He also married Puroku, whose son Maikorehe was the ancestor of Hitiri Te Paerata, Te Rangi Hīroa's main source for the story of conflict with Tupetaka.

== Sources ==
Wairangi's participation in the war with Ngāti Kahu-pungapunga is mentioned in the account of the war by Walter Edward Gudgeon in the 1893 issue of the Journal of the Polynesian Society, with no indication of the sources on which it is based., as well as the account given by Pei Te Hurinui Jones, based on oral testimony given at the Māori Land Court at Cambridge in a dispute over ownership of the Waotū area, and the account given by Hōri Wirihana of Ngāti Kauwhata in evidence to the Māori Land Court at Ōtorohanga on 17 August 1886.

The account of the conflict with Tupetaka is reported by Te Rangi Hīroa based on an oral account he heard from Hitiri Te Paerata and others of Ngāti Raukawa, and by Pei Te Hurinui Jones, drawing on an oral account that he heard from Hōne Teri of Ngāti Tūwharetoa and Ngāti Raukawa in 1926.

The Battle of Waiponga is reported by Bruce Biggs, based on an 1898 manuscript by Hari Wahanui of Ōtorohanga.

== Bibliography ==
- Gudgeon, W. E. (1893). "The Tangata Whenua; Or, Aboriginal People of The Central Districts of the North Island of New Zealand". Journal of the Polynesian Society. 2 (4): 203–210.
- Te Rangi Hīroa (1910). "Wairangi, He Tipuna No Ngati-Raukawa / Wairangi, an Ancestor of Ngati-Raukawa". Journal of the Polynesian Society. 19 (4): 197–205. Archived from the original on 18 February 2020.
- Jones, Pei Te Hurinui; Biggs, Bruce (2004). Ngā iwi o Tainui : nga koorero tuku iho a nga tuupuna = The traditional history of the Tainui people. Auckland [N.Z.]: Auckland University Press. ISBN 1869403312.
