= Waimiha Sawmilling Company Limited v Waione Timber Company =

- Court: Court of Appeal of New Zealand
- Full case name: Waimiha Sawmilling Company Limited v Waione Timber Company
- Decided: 29 March 1923
- Citation: NZGazLawRp 32; [1923] NZLR 1137; (1923) 25 GLR 353
- Transcript: judgment

Waimiha Sawmilling Company Limited v Waione Timber Company NZGazLawRp 32; [1923] NZLR 1137; (1923) 25 GLR 353 is a cited case in New Zealand land law.
