= Tiroa =

Rural locality in Manawatū-Whanganui, New Zealand

- Rural locality
- Interactive map of Tiroa
- Coordinates: 38.51°S 175.51°E
- Country: New Zealand
- Region: Manawatū-Whanganui region
- District: Waitomo District
- Ward: Waitomo Rural Ward
- Electorates: Taranaki-King Country; Te Tai Hauāuru (Māori)

Government
  - Territorial Authority: Waitomo District Council
  - Regional council: Manawatū-Whanganui Regional Council
  - Mayor of Waitomo: John Robertson
  - Taranaki-King Country MP: Barbara Kuriger
  - Hauraki-Waikato MP: Hana-Rawhiti Maipi-Clarke

Area
  - Total: 182.32 km^{2} (70.39 sq mi)

Population (June 2025)
  - Total: 50
  - Density: 0.27/km^{2} (0.71/sq mi)
- Postcode(s): 3982

Tiroa is a rural locality in the Waitomo District and Manawatū-Whanganui region of New Zealand's North Island. State Highway 30 runs through the area. The name means "tall cabbage tree".

Pao Mīere, a Māori prophetic movement, built a cross-shaped whare wānanga (house of learning) called Te Miringa Te Kakara near Tiroa about 1887. It was destroyed by fire in 1983.

Tiroa School operated from about 1900 with the buildings replaced in 1925. The school was open at least until 1958.

== Demographics ==
Tiroa covers 182.32 km^{2} (70.39 sq mi) and had an estimated population of 50 as of June 2025, with a population density of 0.27 people per km^{2}.

Historical population
Year	Pop.	±% p.a.
2006	84	—
2013	51	−6.88%
2018	42	−3.81%
2023	45	+1.39%

Tiroa had a population of 45 in the 2023 New Zealand census, an increase of 3 people (7.1%) since the 2018 census, and a decrease of 6 people (−11.8%) since the 2013 census. There were 27 males and 18 females in 21 dwellings. The median age was 41.4 years (compared with 38.1 years nationally). There were 3 people (6.7%) aged under 15 years, 12 (26.7%) aged 15 to 29, 21 (46.7%) aged 30 to 64, and 9 (20.0%) aged 65 or older.

People could identify as more than one ethnicity. The results were 40.0% European (Pākehā), and 73.3% Māori. English was spoken by 100.0%, Māori by 26.7%, and Samoan by 6.7%. New Zealand Sign Language was known by 6.7%. The percentage of people born overseas was 13.3, compared with 28.8% nationally.

Religious affiliations were 20.0% Christian, and 13.3% Māori religious beliefs. People who answered that they had no religion were 53.3%, and 13.3% of people did not answer the census question.

Of those at least 15 years old, 30 (71.4%) had a post-high school certificate or diploma, and 12 (28.6%) people exclusively held high school qualifications. The median income was $39,700, compared with $41,500 nationally. The employment status of those at least 15 was 18 (42.9%) full-time, 6 (14.3%) part-time, and 3 (7.1%) unemployed.
