= Hui (Māori assembly) =

New Zealand term for an assembly or meeting

A hui is a type of Māori assembly, gathering or meeting. A hui is usually called for a specific cause (Māori: take, lit. 'cause for gathering'), which may relate to the "life crises" of an individual—such as a funeral (tangihanga) or twenty-first birthday—or to those events that affect a group—such as opening a marae, or welcoming important guests.

Originally from the Māori language, the word was used by Europeans as early as 1846 to refer to Māori gatherings, but is now increasingly used in New Zealand English to describe events that are not exclusively Māori.

== See also ==
- Culture of New Zealand
