= Maungatautari =

Extinct volcano in the North Island of New Zealand

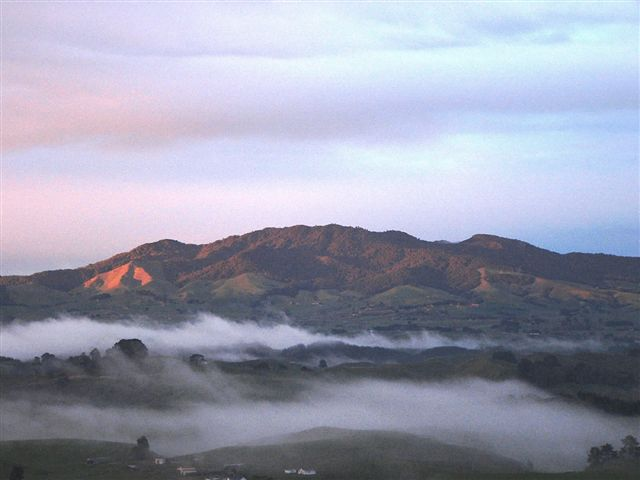
- Maungatautari viewed in the morning.

Highest point
- Elevation: 797 m (2,615 ft)
- Prominence: 648 m (2,126 ft)
- Isolation: 36.4 km (22.6 mi)
- Coordinates: 38°01′08″S 175°34′33″E

Naming
- English translation: mountain of the upright stick

Geography
- Maungatautari (red marker) and its andesite deposits (red shading). The basaltic andesite of Te Tapui is towards top of map. Legend: Key for the volcanics that are shown with panning is: basalt (shades of brown/orange); monogenetic basalts; undifferentiated basalts of the Tangihua Complex in Northland Allochthon; arc basalts; arc ring basalts; dacite; andesite (shades of red); basaltic andesite; rhyolite (ignimbrite is lighter shades of violet); plutonic; White shading is selected caldera features.; Clicking on the rectangle icon enables full window and mouse-over with volcano name/wikilink and ages before present.
- Country: New Zealand
- Region: Waikato
- District: Waipa District

Geology
- Rock age: Pleistocene
- Mountain type: Stratovolcano
- Last eruption: 1.8 ± 0.10 Ma.

Maungatautari is a mountain near Cambridge in the Waikato region in New Zealand's central North Island. The 797-metre-high (2,615 ft) mountain is an extinct stratovolcano. It is a prominent peak and is visible across the Waipa District. The mountain is the site of Sanctuary Mountain Maungatautari a large ecological sanctuary and restoration project.

== History ==
According to Waikato Tainui oral history, the mountain was named by Rakatāura / Hape, the tohunga of the Tainui migratory canoe. After settling at the Kawhia Harbour, Rakatāura and his wife Kahukeke explored the interior of the Waikato.

The New Zealand Ministry for Culture and Heritage gives a translation of "mountain of the upright stick" for Maungatautari.

== Geology ==
Maungatautari is an extinct 797-metre-high (2,615 ft) andesitic-dacitic stratovolcano with a prominence of at least 600 m (2,000 ft) above its surroundings and an estimated age of 1.8 ± 0.10 million years. Its eroded flanks take in most of the surrounding district of the same name as its edifice is between 6 km (3.7 mi) to 8 km (5.0 mi) in diameter but it does abut an exposed greywacke basement range to its west, south of Lake Karapiro. A wide range of volcanic rocks are found from pumiceous and ash flow deposits near the summit and hydrothermally altered andesite on its southern flanks to labradorite, pyroxene, and hornblende andesite and dacite in the bulk of the stratovolcano and a small cone of olivine basalt is located at Kairangi, 7 km (4.3 mi) to the northwest. However the Kairangi cone is much older being the most eastern of the basaltic Alexandra Volcanic Group. Maungatautari's surface ring plain deposits are mainly on the northern and northeastern flanks and include a prominent rock and debris avalanche to the north east of volume 0.28 cubic kilometres (0.067 cu mi), as to its south and east the flanks are covered by the younger and very thick ignimbrite sheets from the massive Mangakino caldera complex eruptions of about 1 million years ago.

== See also ==
- List of volcanoes in New Zealand
