= Rua-pū-tahanga =

Rua-putahanga was a Māori puhi ariki (chieftainess) from Aotea waka and Taranaki maunga who married Whatihua of Tainui, they had children which lead to the combination of Tainui-Taranaki descendants. She probably lived in the sixteenth century.

== Life ==
Rua-putahanga was a daughter of Huetaepo, a chief based at Pātea in Taranaki and a direct descendant of Turi, the captain of the Aotea canoe. She had one brother, Tongātea.

=== Courtship of Tūrongo and Whatihua ===
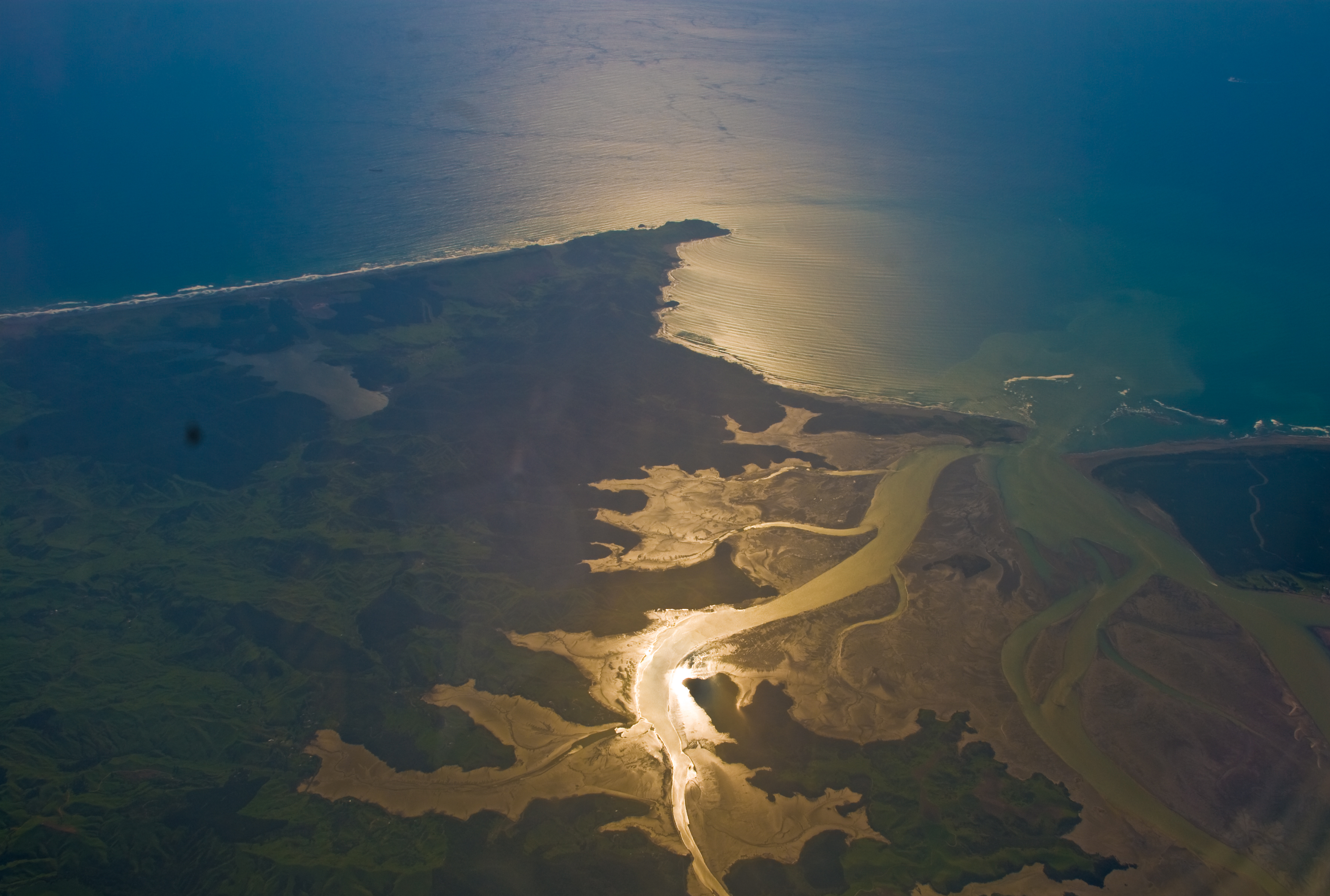
Aerial view of Kāwhia Harbour.

When she reached adulthood, a young chief of Tainui, Tūrongo, son of Tāwhao travelled south from Kāwhia and got engaged to Rua-putahanga. He then returned to Kāwhia and began to build a house at Te Whare-o-Ngarue in Kāwhia in preparation for her arrival. As he was working on the house, his brother and rival, Whatihua, came and advised him that the planned house was too big, convincing him to shorten the tāhuhu (ridge beam) in order to complete the task on time. He also convinced him to plant huge gardens, using up all of his kūmara, so that he had none remaining in his storerooms. Meanwhile, Whatihua built his own house at Te Wharenui ('The Big House') on the Aotea Harbour, where it is said that the outline of the house is still visible in the grass in the summer. While Tūrongo was waiting to harvest his kūmara, Whatihua summoned Rua-putahanga from Pātea.

Rua-putahanga made the journey up the Whanganui River, through Tāngarākau, and Ōhura, into the Mōkau Valley. Near Mahoenui, one of the dogs caught a kiwi and they cooked it, but it came out raw, so they named the place Te Umu-Kaimata ('The oven of under-cooked food). Further on in the journey, they cooked it again and it came out good, so they named that place Taorua ('Twice Cooked'). A spring called Te Puna-a-Rua-putahanga is said to have been created by her using magic powers. When she arrived at Kāwhia, Tūrongo had no food for her and his house was too small to fit all the people whom she had brought along with her, while Whatihua had plenty of food and space, so she married him instead. Beaten, Tūrongo left Kāwhia.

=== Departure of Rua-putahanga ===
Shortly after Rua-putahanga gave birth to her second son, Whatihua's other wife, Apakura, asked him to catch her an eel, so he went to Ōparau, where there was known to be a large eel, and caught it, using one of Rua-putahanga's mauri (magic talismans). This so infuriated Rua-putahanga that she left Kāwhia, taking the baby Uenuku-te-rangi-hōkā with her. After a while Whatihua noticed that she had gone and set off in pursuit. At the Matatua headland, she realised that Whatihua was following her and buried the baby in the sand up to his neck, so that Whatihua had to stop to uncover him and fetch people to take him back to the village. While he did this, Rua-putahanga swum across the Kawhia Harbour, reaching the shore at Te Maika. From there, she passed Lake Taharoa, Taumatakanae, and Harihari, crossed the Marokopa River at the coast, crossed Kiri-te-here stream and reached the base of Mount Moeātoa, where cliffs extend right to the sea. She stopped to rest there and a small stream at the spot is named for the event, Te Mimi-o-Rua-putahanga ('Rua-putahanga's pee').

As she was resting, Whatihua caught up with her and there was nowhere to run, so Rua-putahanga leapt off the cliffs into the roiling waves, where a taniwha, Rākei, picked her up and carried her away. She shouted to Whatihua, "Go back! You will die in your pursuit of my body, now set apart" or "The tides of Rākei of the hundred monster's eyes have risen," both now proverbial sayings. He returned to Kawhia.

=== Later life ===
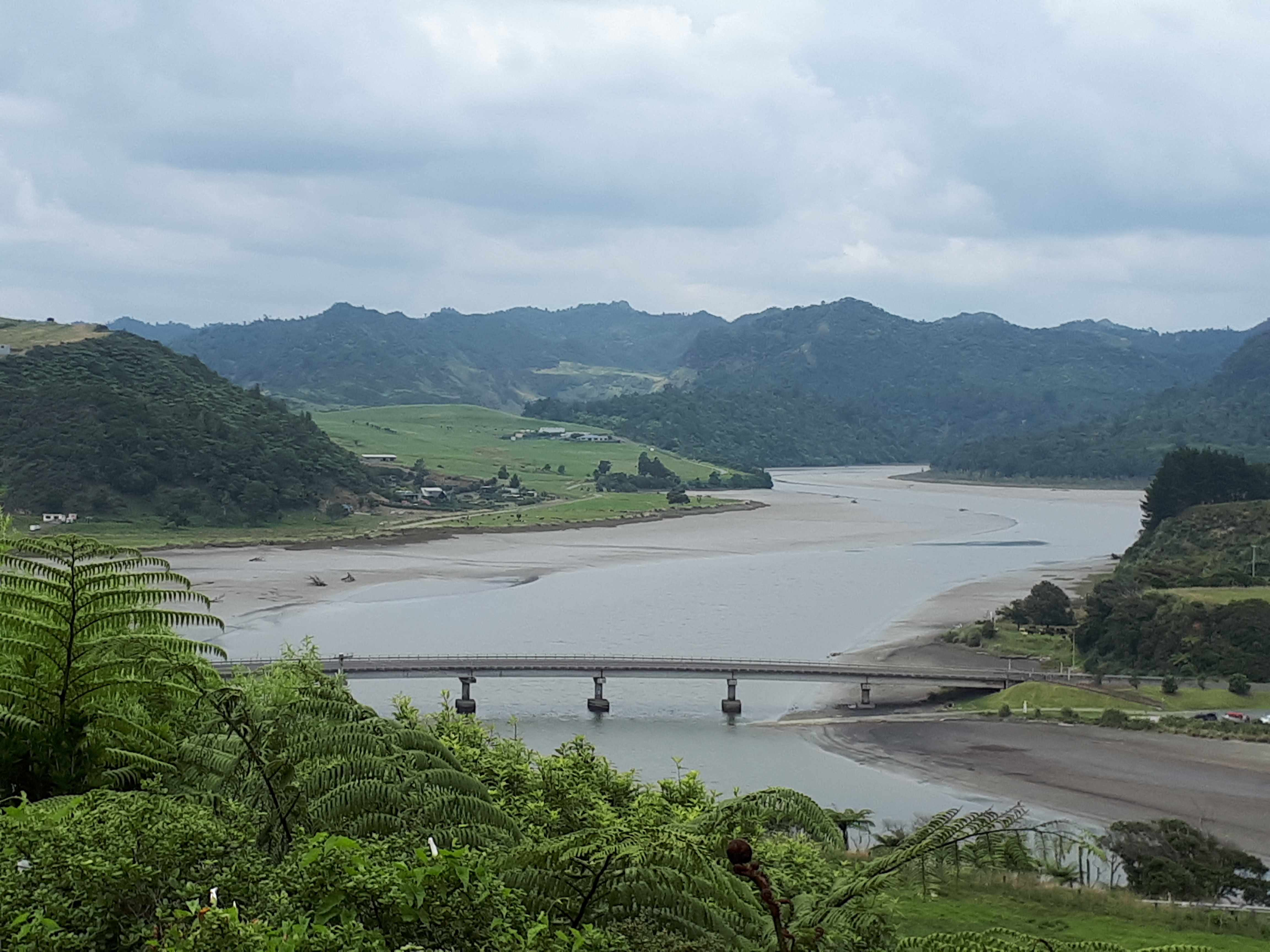
Mōkau River, near its mouth

Rua-putahanga carried on to Mōkau, where she married a local man called Mōkau (after whom the place was named). They had a daughter, Kura-mōnehu, who married Rōrā, son of Maniapoto. Subsequently, she left Mōkau too, travelling to the Waitara River and then around the east side of Mount Taranaki, back to Pātea. This route, subsequently used by Māori to travel between north and south Taranaki became known as Te Ara-Tapu-o-Rua-putahanga ('The sacred path of Rua-putahanga').

During this journey, she stopped for the night on the bank of the Kahouri River. A spring where she sat and wept was named Te Puna-Roimata-o-Rua-putahanga ('The spring of Rua-putahanga's tears'). Afterwards she fell asleep as she lay staring at the night sky, and thus the place was named Whakāhu-rangi ('turn to the heaven'), which is now the Māori name for the nearby town of Stratford.

When she returned to Pātea, Rua-putahanga married a man of Ngāti Ruanui and had two further children, Wheke ('octopus') and Ngū ('squid'). According to Percy Smith, as she was dying, she told them that they should place her bones on a whata ('shelf') and that if their elder half-brothers ever visited, her bones would fall from the whata so that they would recognise them. When the brothers did visit, Wheke and Ngū were not in the village and while they were waiting around they accidentally knocked the bones from the whata. The villagers shouted at them for desecrating the bones of Wheke and Ngū's mother and they responded "I always thought those were fishes' names, now I learn they are men," causing the people of the village to attack them. However, virtually the same story is told by Hiapoto, mother of Kaihamu, and Pei Te Hurinui Jones argues that Smith's attribution of this story to Rua-putahanga is mistaken.

== Family ==
Rua-pū-tahanga married three times. With her first husband, Whatihua, she had two sons:

- Uenuku-tuhatu, probably the same as Uetapu, who had three sons:

- Te-Ata-i-o-rongo, who married Rangi-waea and had one son, Kaihu AKA perhaps known by Kai-ihu
- Mania-o-rongo
- Tū-a-tangiroa, who had a daughter, Hine-au-Pounamu, who married Rereahu

- Uenuku-te-rangi-hōkā, also called Uenuku-whāngai ('the adopted') because he was raised by Apakura, who had two sons:

- Tamāio
- Hotunui
- Mōtai, who married Hinewai, a daughter of Whatihua's brother Tūrongo, and had a son Kura-nui, whose daughter Rerei-ao married Pikiao, ancestor of Ngāti Pikiao, creating a link between Tainui and Te Arawa that was considered very important in Tainui whakapapa.

With her second husband, Mōkau, she had one daughter:

- Kura-mōnehu, who married Rōrā, son of Maniapoto

With her third husband, Porou, she had two children

- Wheke ('octopus')
- Ngū ('squid')

== Bibliography ==
- Jones, Pei Te Hurinui; Biggs, Bruce (2004). Ngā iwi o Tainui : nga koorero tuku iho a nga tuupuna = The traditional history of the Tainui people. Auckland [N.Z.]: Auckland University Press. ISBN 1869403312.
- Gordon, W.F. (1928). Carved from the bush : Stratford, 1878-1928 : the town and district's record of effort : a history of the town and district of Stratford, Taranaki / compiled for the Jubilee Executive in connection with the celebrations March 26th to 31st 1928. New Plymouth: McLeod & Slade.
- Smith, S. Percy (1910). History and Traditions of the Maoris of the West Coast North Island of New Zealand Prior to 1840. New Plymouth: Polynesian Society.
