= Kaihamu =

Kaihamu was a Māori rangatira (chieftain) of the Tainui tribal confederation from the Waikato region, New Zealand. He probably lived in the first half of the seventeenth century.

== Life ==
Kaihamu, whose name means 'scrap-eater', was the son of Mangō, who was based at Te Whena and had become the most prominent rangatira around the Kāwhia Harbour after defeating Whatihua in a battle at Mahea-takataka. Through his father Kaihamu was a direct descendant of Hoturoa, the captain of the Tainui canoe. His mother was Hiapoto, who came from Waitōtara in south Taranaki and belonged to the Ngā Rauru iwi. John White and Māui Pōmare say that he had a brother, Uetapu, but other sources disagree. As a youth Kaihamu learned magic and became a skilled tohunga.

As an adult, Kaihamu made his base at Moeātoa, to the south of Kāwhia.

=== Journey to Waitōtara ===
Places in the life of Kaihamu.
1 Kāwhia
2 Moeātoa
3 Waitōtara
4 Ōpōtiki
5 Maketu

After Kaihamu was born, Mangō took Hiapoto back to Waitōtara and she remarried to one of her own people, with whom she had two further sons, Ngū ('squid') and Wheke ('octopus'). When Hiapoto was dying, she told Ngū and Wheke that they should place her bones in a carved coffin inside a little house on a raised platform in the courtyard at the centre of the village and that if their elder half-brothers ever visited, her skull would fall from the platform so that they would recognise them. In another version, her head was smoked and placed on the pare (lintel) above the door of their house. Years later, Kaihamu and Uetapu wished to meet their mother so they travelled to Taranaki with a party of 140 men. When they arrived in Waitōtara, Hiapoto's skull fell from the platform as predicted, but Ngū and Wheke did not remember their mother's words and did not recognise Kaihamu and Uetapu as their brothers.

When Kaihamu and Uetapu arrived in the marae they violated tapu, either by sitting in the position normally taken by Ngū and Wheke, or by trying to enter their house. The Ngā Rauru objected and tried to stop them, but Kaihamu said, "I eat squid, I eat octopus, and you are also food for me." The Ngā Rauru were furious and secretly began summoning men to come and kill Kaihamu and his party.

The villagers began to prepare fires in order to cook Kaihamu and his comrades, pretending that they were preparing a feast for them. One of Kaihamu's men went out and in the dark the Ngā Rauru did not recognised him and let slip that they were planning to kill the guests. When he reported back, Kaihamu used his mother's preserved head as the tuahu altar for the sacrifice of a kuri dog and then magically sent his comrade, Tuatangiroa out the window and all the way to Kāwhia in a single day, where he placed the body of the dog on the tuahu of Hoturoa. Then Kaihamu went out and announced his parentage and they repented, but Kaihamu pulled off his belt and chanted a karakia ('incantation') and waved his skirt to either side, causing everyone in Waitōtara to instantly drop dead. Kaihamu returned Hiapoto's skull to her coffin. The event is known as Ko Tapu-nui a Ngaere ('the great sacred oscillation') and is the source of a pepeha ('proverb'), "ko te waha mana a Kaihamu" ('The powerful and effective utterance of Kaihamu').

Kaihamu used his magic whau stick, Te Whaka-itu-pawa to carry the scalps of the dead people back to Kāwhia, so that he could perform the victory ceremonies, and then to travel back to Waitōtara in a single day. These ceremonies freed the men from any culpability for the murders and Ngā Rauru never took vengeance.

=== War with Rangi-houhiri of Ngai Te Rangi ===
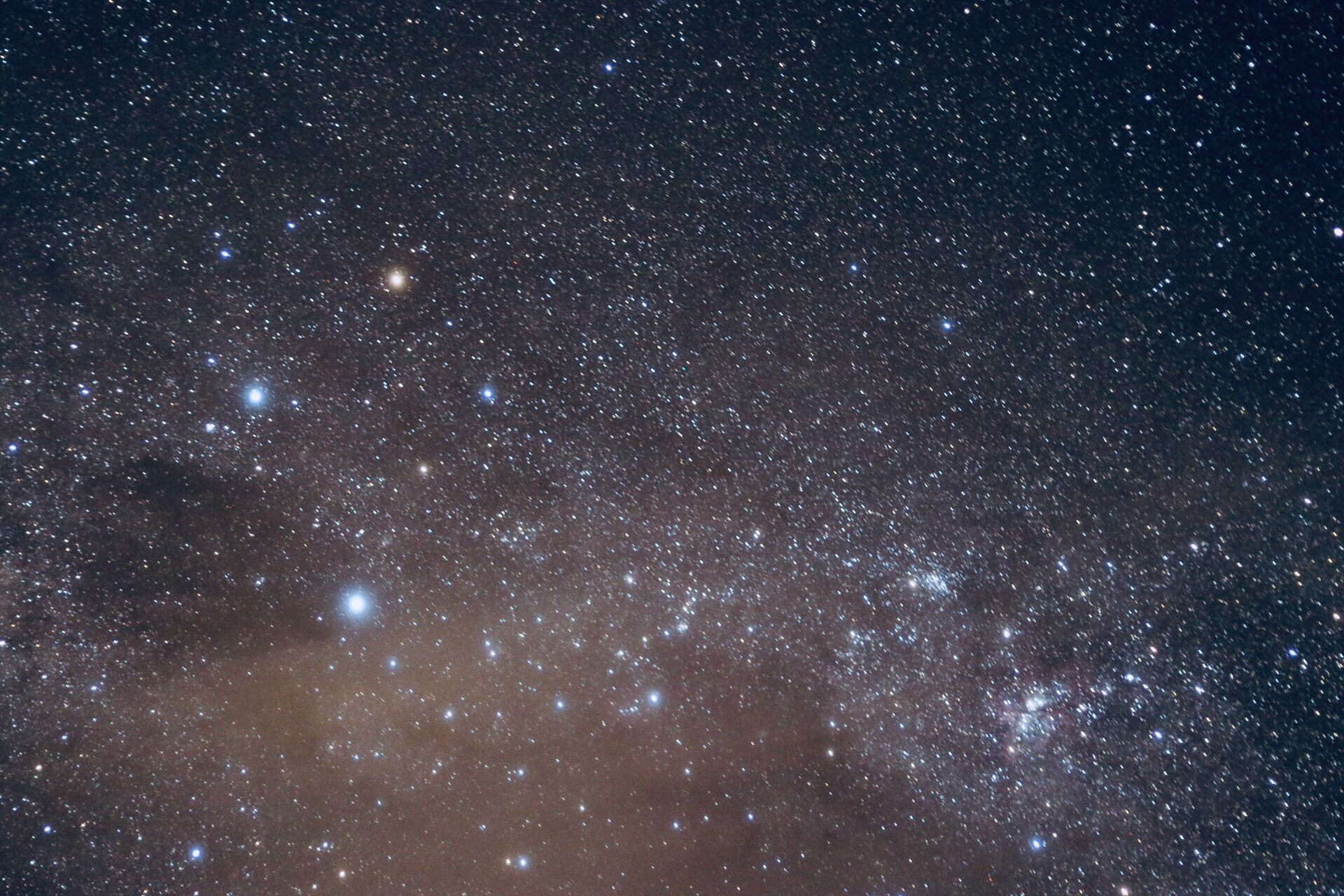
The Southern Cross and 'Tama-rereti's canoe' (the Milky Way.

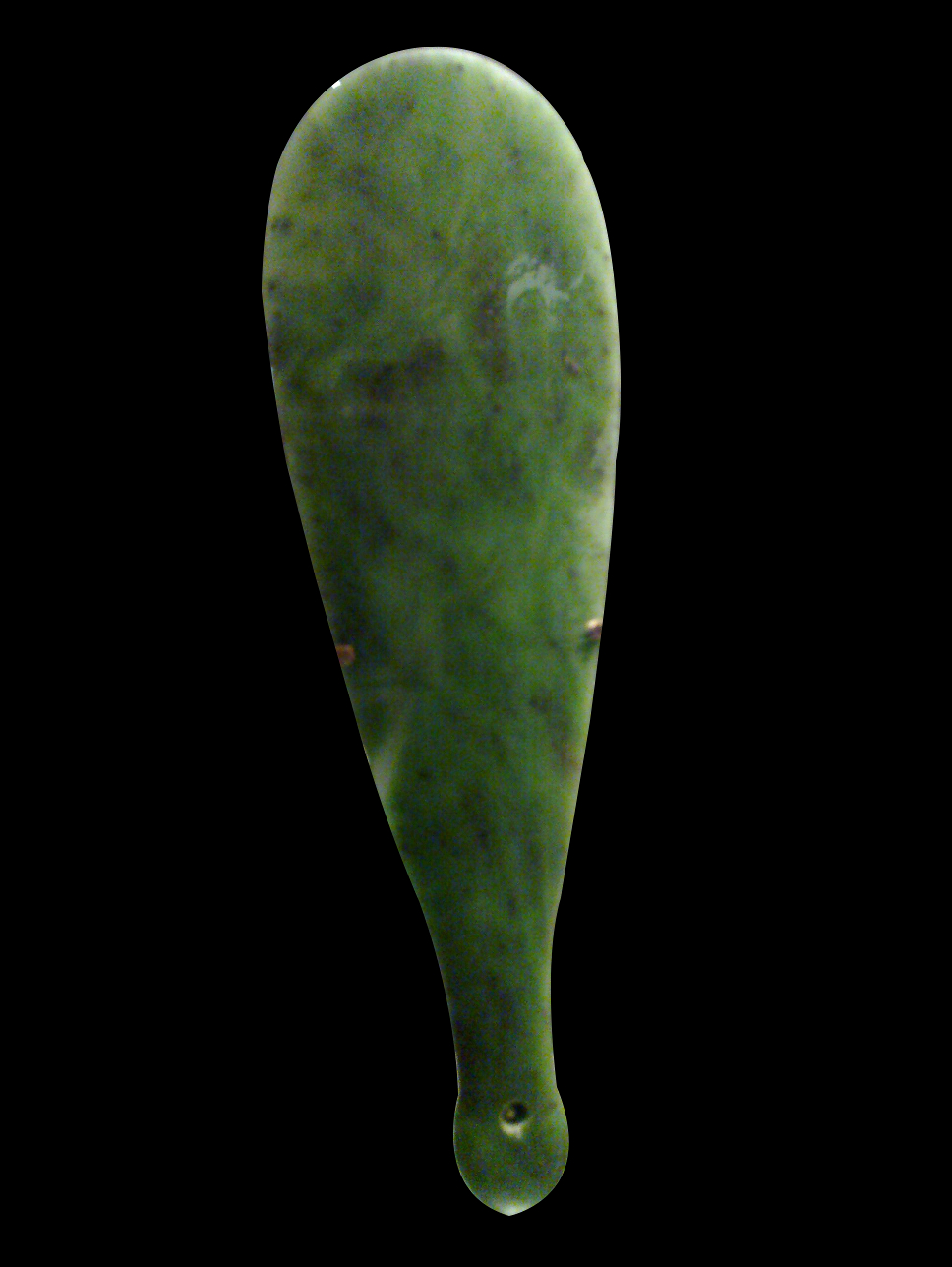
A mere club.

Rangi-houhiri, a rangatira of Ngāi Te Rangi from Ōpōtiki in the eastern Bay of Plenty, attacked Waitaha, an iwi within Te Arawa, which was based at Maketu in the western Bay of Plenty. He captured Maketu and then treacherously killed their rangatira Tukutehe when he came to negotiate a peace.

Tukutehe's wife, Tū-parahaki, a descendant of Hotunui, was distraught and went into seclusion for two years, refusing to marry any of her many suitors unless they avenged her husband by killing Rangi-houhiri. One of Tukutehe's relatives, the elderly Mōtai-tangata-kotahi ('one-man-Mōtai'), was angry because his people had stopped delivering food for him. Therefore, he sent a messenger to Moeātoa to fetch Kaihamu in order to defeat Ngāi Te Rangi. Kaihamu was chosen because he was a distant cousin of Tū-parahaki.

Kaihamu came with a war party which was so small that the Waitaha said "This war party will not even disturb the dew," but Kaihamu responded, "It's just a small cloud descending from Moeātoa's peak – there are many stars in the sky, but a small cloud can hide them all." He captured one fortress immediately, then at dawn the next day he attacked Te Teko and the blood from the slaughter turned the Rangitaiki River red. He had managed to make his attack before any of Tū-parahaki's other suitors by bribing the slave who was meant to watch the sky and tell the rangatira where the constellations were in the sky, so that they would know what the time was. When they woke up the slave told them that 'Tama-rereti's canoe' (the Milky Way) had not yet 'turned over' and that its anchor (the Southern Cross) remained high in the sky. He also made his war party seem bigger than it really was by having his men shake vines against the trees at the edge of the tree cover.

At this point, Rangi-houhi arrived with a force. He and Kaihamu met in single combat and Kaihamu decapitated him, taking his mere club and his tōpuni (dog's skin cloak). Te Arawa tradition says that this battle took place at Pōporo-huama, at the mouth of the Waihi River. Māui Pōmare says it took place between the mouth of the Waihi and the mouth of the Kaituna River at Te Whare-o-te-Rangimarere. Both locations are very near Maketu.

Returning to Maketu, all of the warriors gathered around Tū-parahaki claiming to have killed Rangi-houhi and throwing severed heads on the ground in front of her to prove it. Finally, Kaihamu came forward and laid out the mere, the tōpuni, and Rangi-houhi's head. Then Tū-parahaki agreed to marry Kaihamu and made the journey to Moeātoa. Kaihamu had gone in advance to prepare everything for Tū-parahaki's arrival and she was led by Kaihamu's dog which indicated the spot which Kaihamu had made tapu for her camp each night on the journey. Māui Pōmare reports the pōwhiri chanted by the people of Moeātoa when Tū-parahaki arrived.

== Family ==
Kaihamu and Tū-parahaki had one son, Te Urutira, who himself married Kearangi / Takikawehi and had five sons: Tū-pāhau, Pari-nui, Te Awha, Puha, and Kiore-pukahu.

== Sources ==
John White describes the Kaihamu's visit to Waitōtara in the fourth volume of The Ancient History of the Maori (1888). He does not name his source. Māui Pōmare also recounts the story in Legends of the Maori. Virtually the same story is told by Percy Smith about the sons of Rua-pū-tahanga. Pei Te Hurinui Jones argues that the attribution to Kaihamu and Hiapoto is the correct one and the link to Rua-pū-tahanga is mistaken.

Pei Te Hurinui Jones recounts the story of Rangi-houi and Tū-parahaki based on an oral account which he heard from Āihe Huirama and Te Nguha Huirama of Ngāti Tamainupō in November 1932 and May 1933. Māui Pōmare also recounts the story in Legends of the Maori.

== Bibliography ==
- Jones, Pei Te Hurinui; Biggs, Bruce (2004). Ngā iwi o Tainui : nga koorero tuku iho a nga tuupuna = The traditional history of the Tainui people. Auckland [N.Z.]: Auckland University Press. ISBN 1869403312.
- Pōmare, Māui (1934). Legends of the Maori. Vol. 2. Wellington [N.Z.]: Harry H. Tombs.
- Smith, Percy (1910). History and traditions of the Maoris of the West Coast, North Island of New Zealand, prior to 1840. New Plymouth: Polynesian Society.
- White, John (1888). The Ancient History of The Maori, his Mythology and Traditions: Tai-Nui. Vol. 4. Wellington: Government Printer.
