= Tamāio =

Tamāio was a Māori rangatira (chieftain) of the Tainui tribal confederation, based at Kāwhia in Waikato, New Zealand. He was the first chieftain to lead a war-party inland from Kāwhia, in a war against Ngāti Hā, sometime around the middle of the sixteenth century.

== Life ==
Places in the war with Ngāti Hā.
1 Kāwhia
2 Puketutu
3 Te Tīroa
4 Taumarunui

Tamāio's father was Uenuku-te-rangi-hōkā, son of Whatihua (through whom he was a male-line descendant of Hoturoa, the captain of the Tainui) and Rua-pū-tahanga of Ngāti Ruanui (through whom he was a descendant of Turi, the captain of the Aotea canoe). Tamāio's mother was Te Kete-kura, who was also descended from Hoturoa on her father's side and from the Tokomaru on her mother's side. He had two half-brothers, Hotunui, who was born after Uenuku-te-rangi-hōkā had moved to south Taranaki, and Mōtai.

=== War with Ngāti Hā ===
There was a tribe called Ngāti Hā, led by three chiefs, Hā-nui ('Big Hā'), Hā-roa ('Long Hā'), and Hā-kūhā-nui ('Big-thigh Hā'), who was the great-grandson of Tia, who arrived in New Zealand on the Arawa canoe. Ngāti Hā had been driven out of the Taupō region by Ngāti Tūwharetoa and headed west, establishing a village on the Mōkau River, upstream from Puketutu. Tamāio's cousin Rereahu, one of the chieftains of Tainui in southern Waikato noticed the Ngāti Hā at Te Tīroa while he was foraging for black ponga shoots and reported to Tamāio that they were coming to seize the land.

Therefore, Tamāio raised a war party and advanced on the Ngāti Hā village. Since the village was too well-defended to take by force, Tamāio devised a stratagem. He had his party march up onto a hill that was visible from the Ngāti Hā village, then down into a valley that was out of sight, before returning to the hill with their cloaks turned inside out. This was repeated three times and led the Ngāti Hā to believe that Tamāio's war party was much larger than it actually was, so they abandoned the location without a fight, fleeing back to Te Tīroa.

Tamāio pursued Ngāti Hā to Te Tīroa, which was also too well-defended to besiege. Tamāio therefore pretended to encamp on one side of the village and then sent a group of his troops around to the woods on the other side of the village, with their weapons tied to the side of their bodies that was not visible from the village. Believing them to be unarmed men collecting firewood, the three chiefs of Ngāti Hā sallied forth from the village with their warriors and were killed.

The remaining Ngāti Hā fled, splitting into two groups, one of which went to Taupō, while the other went to Waimiha and then on to Ōngarue, establishing a fortress where the Ōngārue River meets the Whanganui River (modern Taumarunui). Tamāio pursued the latter group, but their chief Te Hoata came to meet him and negotiated a peace by marrying his daughter Hinemata to Tamāio.

=== Family ===
Tamāio and Hinemata had a daughter, Rangi-ānewa, who married her cousin Rereahu. They had one child, Te Ihinga-a-rangi, who was Rereahu's eldest son.

== Sources ==
The story is reported by Pei Te Hurinui Jones, based on a version told to him by his uncle Te Hurinui Te Wano before 1911. The raid is also referred to in evidence presented to the Ōtorohanga Land Court by Te Naunau Hīkaka on 15 December 1892.

== Bibliography ==
- Grace, John Te Herekiekie (1959). Tuwharetoa: The history of the Maori people of the Taupo District. Auckland [N.Z.]: A.H. & A.W. Reed.
- Phillips, F. L. (1989). Nga tohu a Tainui Landmarks of Tainui: a geographical record of Tainui traditional history. Otorohanga: Tohu Publishers. ISBN 9780908596263.
- Jones, Pei Te Hurinui; Biggs, Bruce (2004). Ngā iwi o Tainui : nga koorero tuku iho a nga tuupuna = The traditional history of the Tainui people. Auckland [N.Z.]: Auckland University Press. ISBN 1869403312.
