= Tū-pāhau =

New Zealand Māori chief (17th century)

Tū-pāhau was a Māori rangatira (chieftain) of the Tainui tribal confederation from the Waikato region, New Zealand. Initially based at Kāwhia, he led a force south to settle at Marokopa, where his descendants became the Ngāti Toa and Ngāti Rārua iwi. He probably lived in the second half of the seventeenth century.

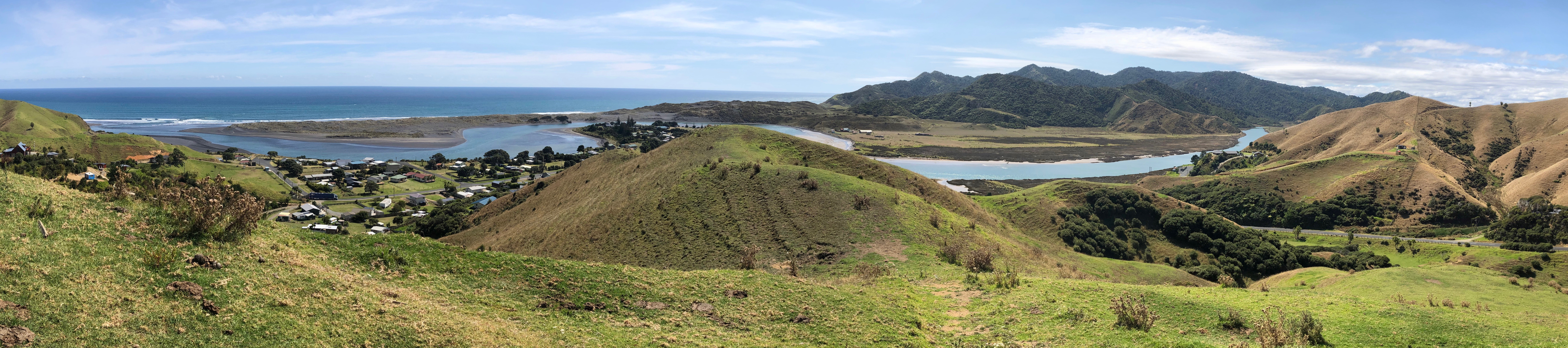
View of Marokopa from the south, showing the mouth of the Marokopa River, and the marae on the north bank

== Life ==
Tū-pāhau was born at Kāwhia. His father, Te Urutira, was a son of Kaihamu and Tū-parahaki, both of whom were descendants of Hoturoa, the captain of the Tainui canoe. His mother, Kearangi / Takikawehi was a descendant of Tongātea of Ngāti Ruanui, through his grandson Tamainu-pō. In one account, Tū-pāhau received his name, which means 'bearded man', in commemoration of Tamainu-pō, because the latter only received the tohi baptismal ritual when he was an adult.

=== Conflict with Tamure ===
Tū-pāhau established a base at Rakau-nui on the Kāwhia Harbour and developed a reputation as a great tohunga or priest. Another tohunga, Tamure, came from Rangiahua in Kāwhia to visit him, but they argued about the correct wording of a karakia (song, incantation) called Tū-hangaia. Tamure was so offended at being challenged that he stormed off and returned to Rakau-nui with a war party of two thousand men. Tū-pāhau tried to negotiate, but Tamure refused. Although Tū-pāhau had only a small force of 140 men, his men won the battle and put Tamure's force to flight. As he pursued the enemy forces, Tū-pāhau caught up with Tamure, tackled him to the ground, and bit his head to show that he had won, but then let him go. Because of this mercy, Tū-pāhau was called the toa rangatira (chieftainly / chivalrous warrior). The name was given to his grandson, Toa-rangatira, and his descendants were named Ngāti Toa-rangatira, or Ngāti Toa for short.

=== Campaign in Marokopa ===
Places in the conflict over Marokopa
1 Heipipi (base of Rakapare and Tama-oho)
2 Tū-pāhau / Mangaroa (base of Tū-pāhau)
3 Manga-kirikiri barrier
4 Toka-mapuna island
5 Te Parapara-i-ō-tapu / Turi-akina mouth
6 Kiri-te-here beach
7 Rakei-Mata-taniwha

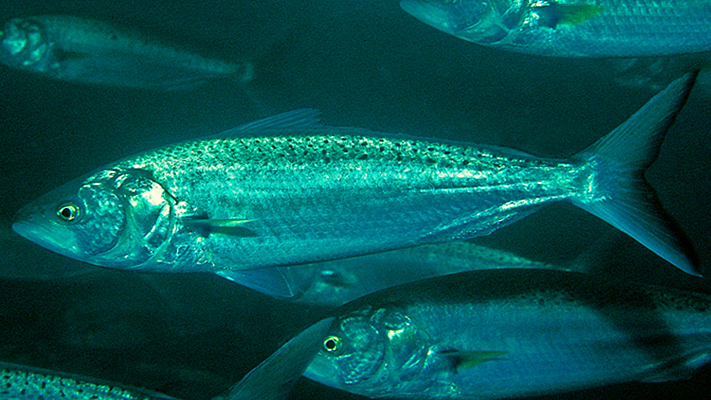
A school of kahawai

Tū-pāhau led a group down to Marokopa and established a fortress to the north of the Marokopa River, at Mangaroa, which he named Tū-pāhau after himself. Māui Pōmare says that he did this because he had heard that the area was rich in kahawai due to a sacred stone that his ancestors had left there, called Rangipaetaha. Pei Te Hurinui Jones says that Tū-pāhau did this because he had ancestral ties to the region through his maternal ancestor, Manu-Tongātea (son of Tongātea), and wanted to recapture it from two rangatira, Rakapare and Tama-oho, who had taken the place from Tū-pāhau's maternal relatives, Ngāti Awa, and established two fortresses, one above the other, on a ridge inland from Marokopa, called Heipipi.

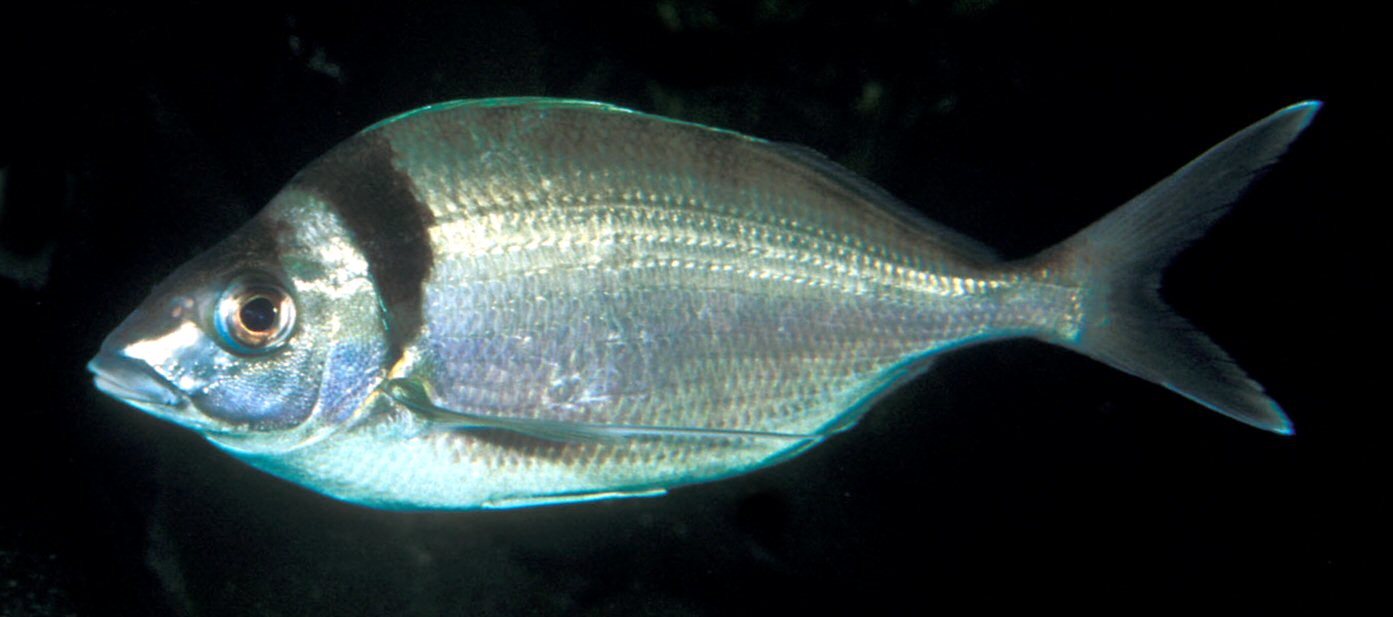
A tarakihi

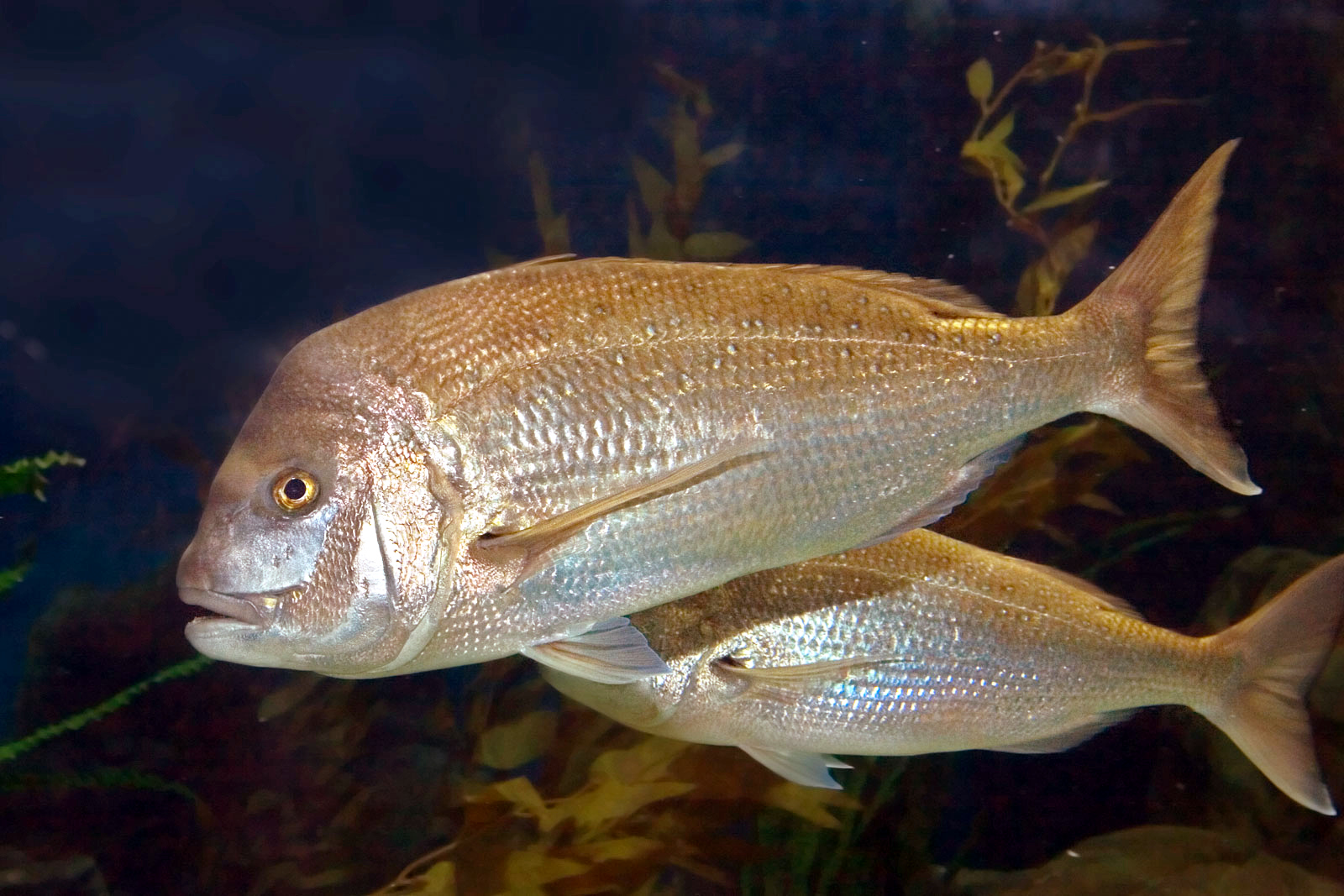
A pair of tāmure (snapper)

Tū-pāhau led his men to Te Aho-roa (located on the Marokopa River, upstream of Heipipi) and they built three waka (canoes). Rakapare and Tama-oho had slung ropes across the river at Manga-kirikiri, Te One-poto, and Te Rore Ārai a Rakapare, to act as barriers preventing war-parties from paddling downstream. These ropes were hung slack under the water and the plan was for Rakapare and Tama-oho's men to pull them tight as the waka passed over, causing the waka to capsize. However, Tū-pāhau stationed men at the front of his waka with poles, to raise the ropes, so that they could pass underneath, and Tū-pāhau's fleet successfully passed through all the barriers and out to sea, where they went fishing for themselves near the rock Toka-māpuna, catching large hauls of kahawai, huhu-moea, tarakihi, tāmure (snapper), and mango (shark). Then they brought the waka ashore at Tū-pāhau.

After Tū-pāhau had settled in the region, Rakapare and Tama-oho went out fishing and caught a great haul. When they returned, Tū-pāhau's men went down and asked for a share of the catch. Seeing that there were 140 of them, Rakapare gave them 140 fish, an insultingly small amount. The people returned to Tū-pāhau, dumping the fish on an island at the mouth of the Turi-akina, which therefore became known as Te Parapara-i-ō-tapu ('The-scraps-from-the-sacred-food'). This incident angered Tū-pāhau and also meant that he was now aware that his forces were the same size as those of Rakapare and Tama-oho. Pōmare places this incident after the journey down the river, while Jones places it beforehand.

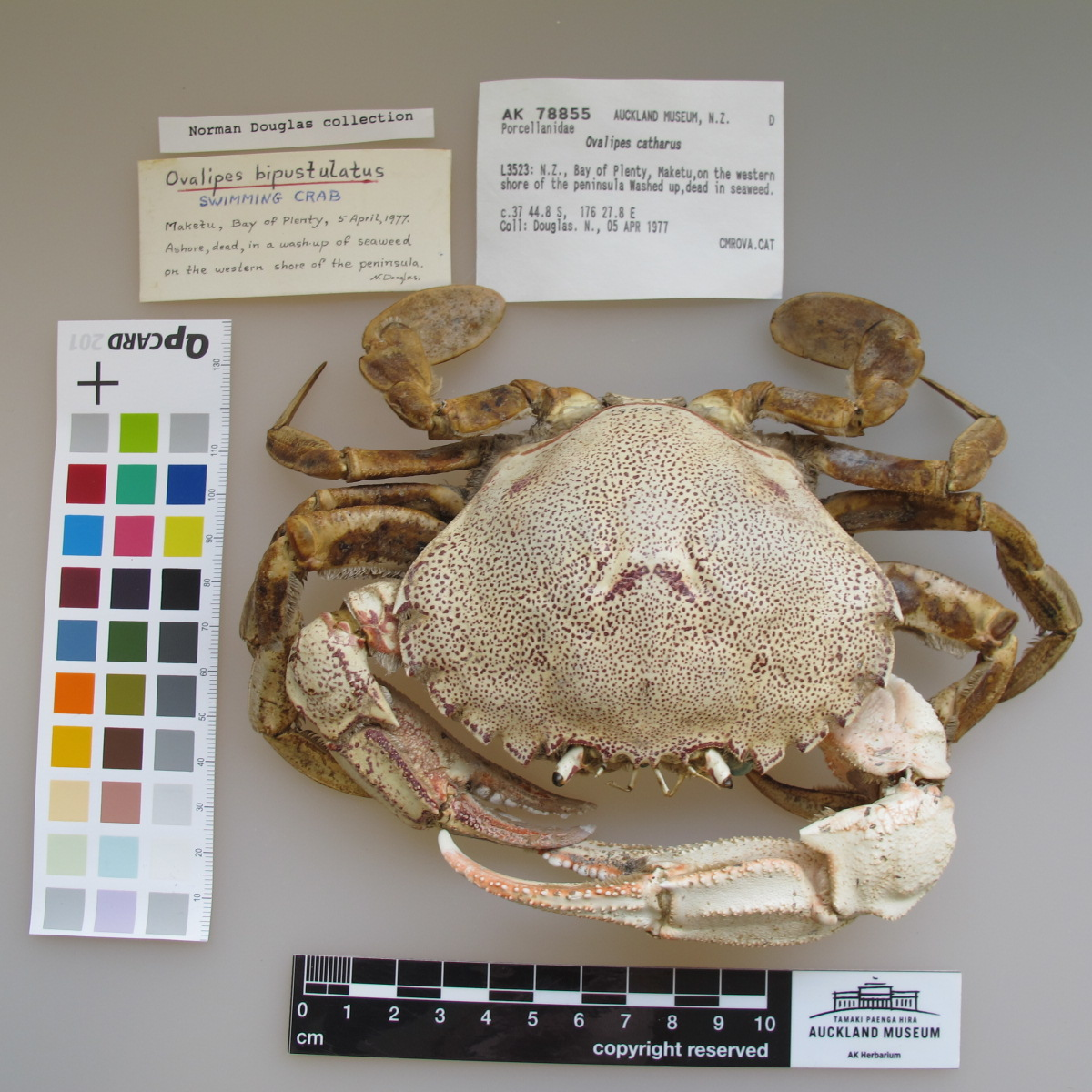
A pāpaka (paddle crab)

Shortly after this, Rakapare and Tama-oho went out hunting for pāpaka crabs, in the area of Kiri-te-here and Rākei-Mata-taniwha. This was done at night with torches. A group of Tū-pāhau's men went out with baskets and in the darkness, Rakapare and Tama-oho's men mistook them for members of their own group and handed all the crabs over to them. When he realised what had happened, Rakapare led a war-party down the beach to attack Tū-pāhau, crossing Kōpia bay with the tide almost full. As they approached, Tū-pāhau chose to have sex with his wife, Hine-te-ao, taking no action against the approaching forces until they were already climbing the ramparts of the fort. Earlier, Tū-pāhau had filled his three waka with stones and hung them above the path from Kōpia up to the fortress. Now, he cut the ropes, which were holding his three waka in place, causing them to fall down on top of the attackers. Then he charged down and routed the enemy force.

As they fled, Rakapare called on Tama-oho to regroup and counter-attack at Rau-ngāwari. However, Tama-oho had noticed that Rakapare and his men had been holding back part of the bird catch from their hunting expeditions and eating it by themselves at night. So, he shouted back to Rakapare, "Night-eater can fight; Day-eater is off", which is now a proverbial saying. When Rakapare and his men reached Rau-ngāwari, Tama-oho's men were not there. Lacking Tama-oho's support, Rakapare had to flee inland. Jones says that, Tū-pāhau caught up with him just after he had crossed the Kaiwaka river and threw his spear across the river, killing Rakapare and another. As a result, the place was named Nga Awa-pūrua ('The double streams').

=== Family ===
Tū-pāhau married o Hine-te-ao, who came from Maungakiekie and belonged to the Waiohua tribal confederation. Their son Korokino was the father of Toa-rangatira, the namesake of Ngāti Toa. He also married Rārua-ioio, with whom he had two sons, Kārewarewa and Hika-haere, whose descendants are Ngāti Rārua.

== Sources ==
Māui Pōmare recounts the story of Tū-pāhau in Legends of the Maori. Pei Te Hurinui Jones tells the story of the expedition to Marokopa, from an oral account that he heard from Te Nguha Huirama of Ngāti Tamainupō, Ngāti Maniapoto, and Ngāti Te Ata on 24 May 1932.

== Bibliography ==
- Jones, Pei Te Hurinui; Biggs, Bruce (2004). Ngā Iwi o Tainui: Nga Koorero Tuku Iho a nga Tuupuna = The Traditional History of the Tainui People. Auckland [N.Z.]: Auckland University Press. ISBN 1869403312.
- Pōmare, Māui (1934). Cowan, James (ed.). Legends of the Maori: Volume 2. Wellington [N.Z.]: Harry H. Tombs.
