= Tūrongo =

New Zealand Māori chief

Places in the life of Tūrongo.
1 Kāwhia
2 Pātea
3 Pukehou
4 Ōkoroire
5 Rangiātea

Tūrongo was a Māori rangatira (chief) in the Tainui confederation of tribes, based at Rangiātea, near Waikeria, New Zealand. He quarrelled with his brother, Whatihua, and as a result Tainui was split between them, with Tūrongo receiving the southern Waikato region. His marriage to Māhina-a-rangi created a genealogical link between Tainui and Ngāti Kahungunu of the East Coast, which is still commemorated. He probably lived in the early sixteenth century.

== Life ==
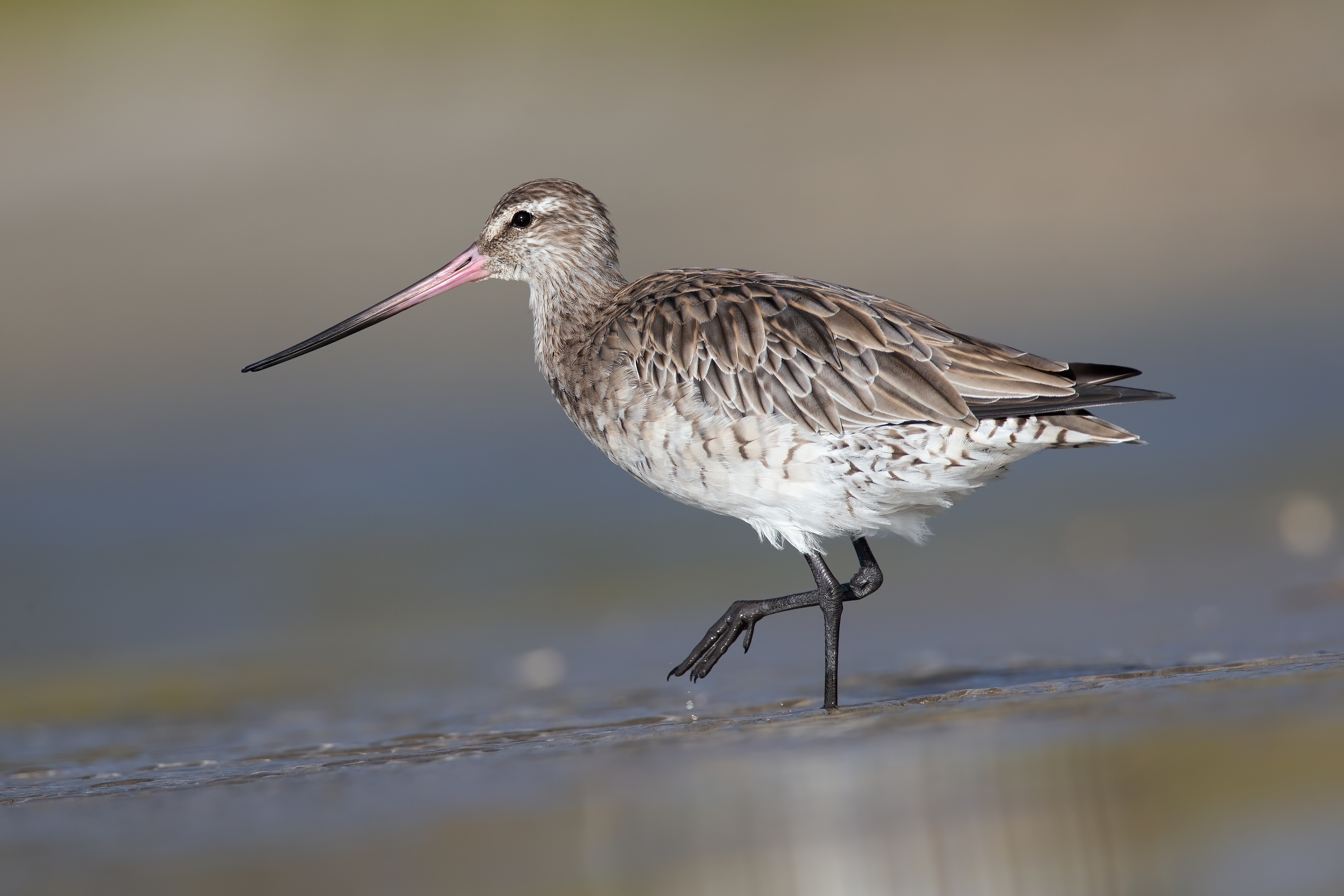
A kūaka (bar-tailed godwit)

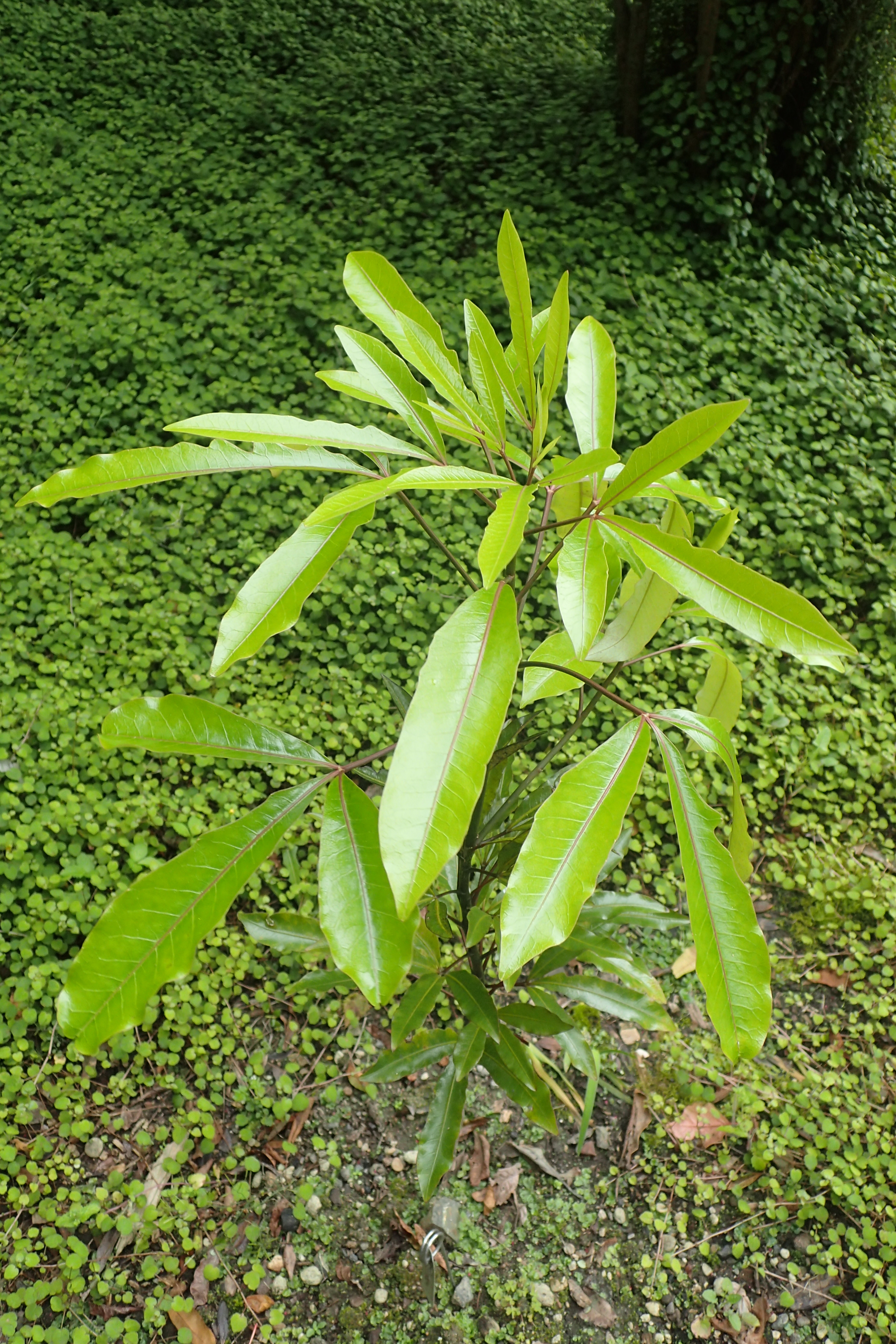
A raukawa plant

Tūrongo was a male-line descendant of Hoturoa, leader of the Tainui waka, through his father Tāwhao. Tāwhao married two daughters of Te Aorere, another descendant of Hoturoa, Pūnui-a-te-kore and Maru-tē-hiakina. Tūrongo was born to the senior wife, Pūnui-a-te-kore, but his half-brother Whatihua was born before him to Maru-tē-hiakina. As a result, the relative status of the two sons was unclear and they competed for pre-eminence.

As youths, Whatihua and Tūrongo went hunting kūaka (bar-tailed godwits) on Kaiwhai island off Kāwhia. At first all the birds came to Tūrongo and he caught great numbers, but while he was focussed on cooking the birds, Whatihua snuck up behind him and "snatched the hau" (the spiritual essence) from Tūrongo's head. After that all of Tūrongo's mana passed to Whatihua.

=== Courtship of Rua-pū-tahanga ===
When the two brothers reached adulthood, Tūrongo travelled south to Pātea and got engaged to Rua-pū-tahanga, a descendant of Turi, leader of the Aotea canoe. He then returned to Kāwhia and began to build a house at Te Whare-o-Ngarue in Kāwhia in preparation for her arrival. As he was working on the house, Whatihua came and advised him that the planned house was too big, convincing him to shorten the tāhuhu (ridge beam) in order to complete the task on time. He also convinced him to plant huge gardens, using up all of his kumara, so that he had none remaining in his storerooms. Meanwhile, Whatihua built his own house at Te Wharenui ('The Big House') on the Aotea Harbour, where it is said that the outline of the house is still visible in the grass in the summer. While Tūrongo was waiting to harvest his kumara, Whatihua summoned Rua-pū-tahanga from Pātea.

Rua-pū-tahanga made the journey up the Whanganui River, through Tāngarākau, and Ōhura, into the Mōkau Valley. The places Te Umu-Kaimata, Taorua, and Te Puna-a-Rua-pū-tahanga are named after events that took place on her journey. When she arrived at Kāwhia, Tūrongo had no food for her and his house was too small to fit all the people whom she had brought along with her, while Whatihua had plenty of food and space, so she married him instead. Beaten, Tūrongo left Kāwhia.

The sad song, Hei konā ra, e whare kikino, tū mai ai ("Farewell, evil house, remain there") that Tūrongo sang as he departed is preserved in Āpirana Ngata's collection of Māori songs, Nga Moteatea.

=== Courtship of Māhina-a-rangi ===
Tūrongo travelled east, seeking to marry Māhina-a-rangi of Ngāti Kahungunu, a daughter of Te Angiangi (also called Te Angi-o-tū) and descendant of Rākei-hikuroa. When he arrived at her village near Pukehou in Hawke's Bay, he found the people building a house and joined in the work, impressing the people with his skill at splitting timber. Privately Te Angiangi encouraged his daughter to take him as a husband. For a number of nights, Māhina-a-rangi covered herself in raukawa perfume and met Tūrongo as he was heading to sleep, without revealing who she was. Eventually, this became public knowledge and the pair were married.

=== Return to Waikato ===
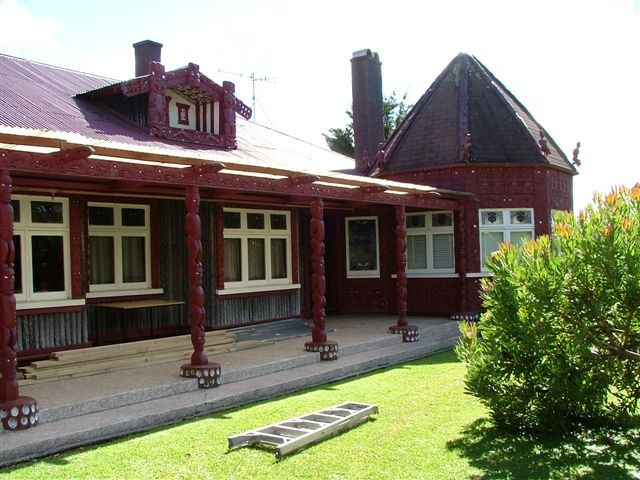
Turongo House at Turangawaewae marae

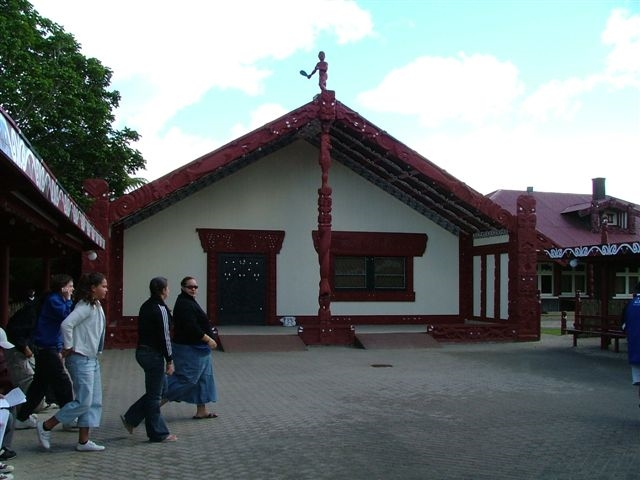
Mahinarangi meeting house at Turangawaewae marae

After the marriage had taken place, Tūrongo's elderly father Tāwhao travelled to Pukehou and invited Tūrongo to return to Kāwhia. There he divided his lands between Whatihua and Tūrongo, roughly along the aukati line that later formed the northern boundary of the King Country. The north went to Whatihua, who remained at Kāwhia, while the south went to Tūrongo, who was sent inland and settled at Rangiātea, near Waikeria and Ōtorohanga.

Tūrongo had told Māhina-a-rangi to come to join him when she was ready to give birth. When that time approached, she went with a party of her people via Lake Waikaremoana, Te Wairoa, and Rotorua, before heading west. At Ōkoroire she gave birth and the hot spring where she bathed afterwards is now known as Te Wai Takahanga a Māhina-a-rangi. She named the son Raukawa, after the perfume she had worn when he was conceived. Then she carried on, crossing the Waikato River north of Cambridge. At this point her dog ran off to Tūrongo and brought him to meet Māhina-a-rangi. Tūrongo led her and her people to Rangiātea, and carried out the tohi baptismal ritual for Raukawa.

The family are mentioned in a nineteenth century song, Te pātere a Ngoki. The official residence of the Māori king and the meeting house at Turangawaewae marae in Ngāruawāhia are Turongo House and Mahinarangi meeting house, named in honour of the couple. The names were suggested by Sir Āpirana Ngata, to commemorate the links between Tainui and Ngāti Porou, which had supplied funding and carvers for the construction of the buildings.

== Family ==
Tūrongo and Māhina-a-rangi had two offspring:

- Raukawa, the ancestor of Ngāti Raukawa, who had four sons, with Turongoihi:

- Rereahu, ancestor of Ngāti Maniapoto, Ngāti Hauā, and Ngāti Korokī Kahukura
- Kurawari, who married a distant cousin, Wharerere, and had several children:

- Whāita, ancestor of Ngāti Whāita
- Korokore, who married Parahore and whose death sparked the Ngāti Raukawa–Ngāti Kahu-pungapunga War

- Whakatere, the ancestor of Ngāti Whakatere:

- Poutū-te-rangi, who settled on the south shore of Lake Taupō and was killed in the Ngāti Tama–Ngāti Tūwharetoa War.

- Takihiku, the ancestor of Ngāti Takihiku, who married Maikuku-tara and had four sons:

- Tama-te-hura
- Upoko-iti, who joined the war against Ngāti Kahu-pungapunga and was father of Te Ata-inutai, who led a raid against Tuwharetoa.
- Wairangi, the ancestor of Ngāti Wairangi, a hapū ('subtribe' or 'clan') of Ngāti Raukawa
- Pipito, an ancestor of Te Rauparaha.

- Hinewai, who married Mōtai, a son of Tūrongo's brother Whatihua, and had a son Kura-nui, whose daughter Rerei-ao married Pikiao, creating a link between Tainui and Te Arawa that was considered very important in Tainui whakapapa. Through her son Hekemaru, she is the ancestor of Ngāti Mahuta and, in some accounts, Ngāti Pāoa.

== Bibliography ==
- Grace, John Te Herekiekie (1959). Tuwharetoa: The history of the Maori people of the Taupo District. Auckland [N.Z.]: A.H. & A.W. Reed.
- Jones, Pei Te Hurinui; Biggs, Bruce (2004). Ngā iwi o Tainui : nga koorero tuku iho a nga tuupuna = The traditional history of the Tainui people. Auckland [N.Z.]: Auckland University Press. ISBN 1869403312.
- Te Rangi Hīroa (1910). "Wairangi, He Tipuna No Ngati-Raukawa / Wairangi, an Ancestor of Ngati-Raukawa". Journal of the Polynesian Society. 19 (4): 197–205.
