= Hotunui =

New Zealand Māori tribal leader (16th century)

Hotunui was a Māori rangatira (chieftain) of the Tainui tribal confederation of Waikato, New Zealand. Through his son Marutūāhu he is the ancestor of four tribes of the Hauraki Gulf: Ngāti Maru, Ngāti Rongoū, Ngāti Tamaterā, and Ngāti Whanaunga. He probably lived in the latter half of the sixteenth century.

== Life ==
Places in the life of Hotunui.
1 Taukōkako
2 Kāwhia
3 Whakatīwai

According to the Tainui traditions reported by Pei Te Hurinui Jones, Hotunui was the son of Uenuku-te-rangi-hōkā, son of Whatihua (through whom he was a male-line descendant of Hoturoa, the captain of the Tainui) and Rua-pū-tahanga of Ngāti Ruanui (through whom he was a descendant of Turi, the captain of the Aotea canoe). He had two half-brothers, Tamāio and Mōtai. Uenuku-te-rangi-hōkā went to live in south Taranaki, the homeland of his mother, settling at Taukōkako, near Taiporohēnui, where Hotonui was born.

Ngāti Maru tradition appears to identify Hotunui with Hoturoa, but while Jones concedes that Hotunui may be an alternative name for Hoturoa, he insists that the father of Marutūāhu is a different, later individual.

=== Marriage to Mihi-rāwhiti ===
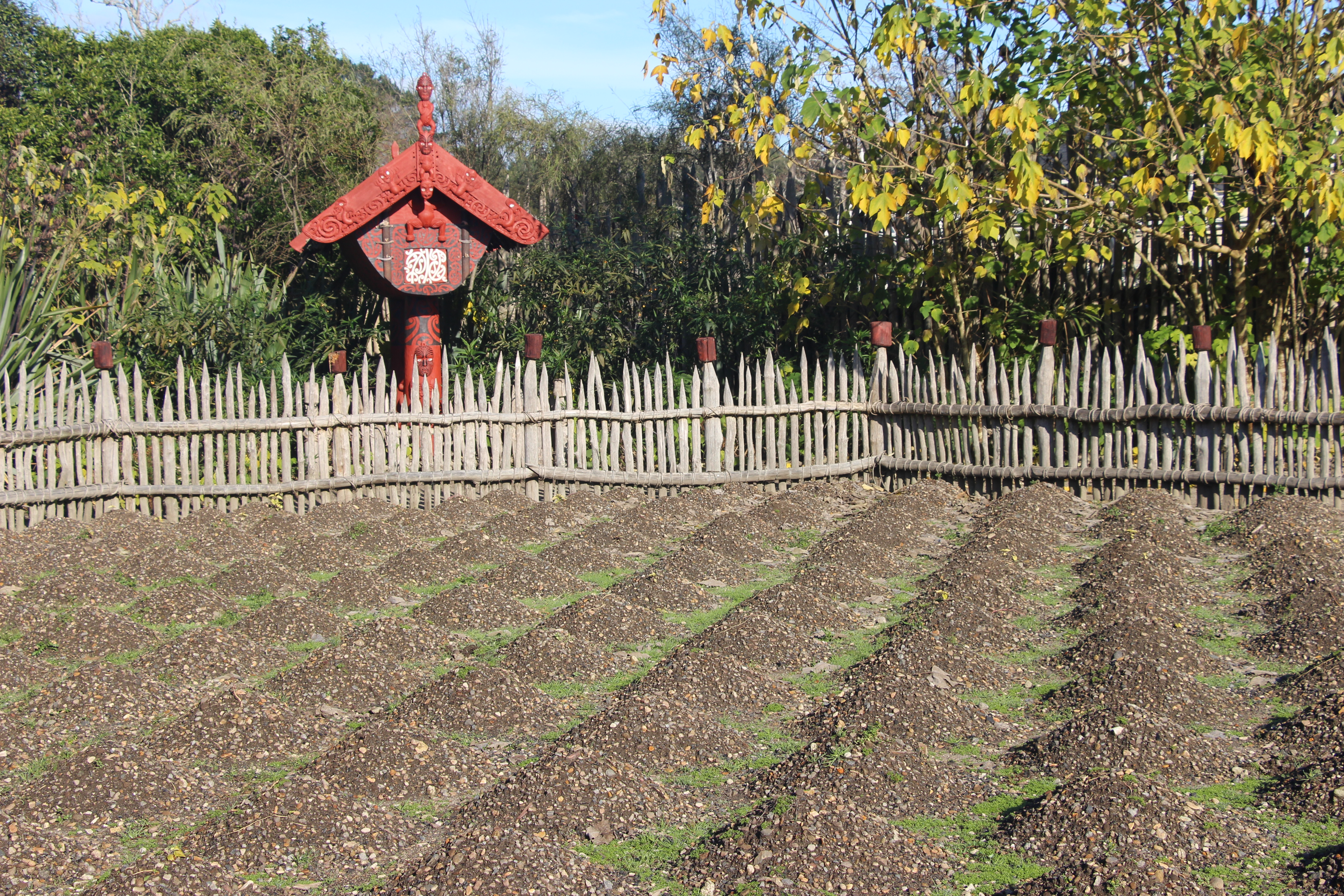
Kūmara mounds in Te Parapara, the traditional Māori garden at Hamilton Gardens.

When Hotonui grew up, he married a lady from Kāwhia, Mihi-rāwhiti (perhaps originally named Whaea-tapoko) daughter of Māhanga (son of Tūheita, rival of Kōkako and a descendant of Hoturoa), and they split their time between Taranaki and Kāwhia. Their first two sons, Manu-kōpiri and Maru-wharanui, were born in south Taranaki. During a stay in Kāwhia, some of Māhanga's kūmara were stolen and Hotonui's footprints were found outside, so he was accused of the theft. In his fury, Māhanga went out, uprooted all of Hotunui's kumara plants and crushed their mounds. Hotunui was so angry and ashamed at this that he left, an event known to Tainui as 'Te Mara-tuahu-kau' (the cultivation mounded without result). Mihi-rāwhiti was pregnant at the time and Hotonui instructed her to name the child in memory of his expulsion: Maru-tūahu ('crushed mound') if it was a boy and Pare-tūahu if it was a girl. In the end she had a boy.

Hotunui settled among the Uri o Pou / Ngāti Pou at Whakatīwai on the Hauraki Gulf, where he married a local woman. According to Pei Te Hurinui Jones, she was a sister of the local chief Te Whata (or Te Whatu). According to a Hauraki Ngāti Maru account reported by John White, she was Waitapu, daughter of Rua-hiore.

=== Journey of Maru-tūahu ===
When Maru-tūahu grew up, he set off for Hauraki in search of his father. Along the way he was met by two daughters of Te Whata, Hine-rehua (or Hine-urunga) and Pare-moeahu, who both instantly decided that they wanted to marry him. After they had discovered who he was, Pare-moeahu ran to Hotonui and told him of his son's arrival. Maru-tūahu subsequently married her. According to Pei Te Hurinui Jones Hine-rehua married Hotunui's other son Pākā, but Ngāti Maru tradition says that she also married Maru-tūahu.

== Family and descendants ==
Hotunui and Mihi-rāwhiti had three children:

- Manu-kōpiri, who was born in South Taranaki, and settled along the Whanganui River.
- Maru-wharanui, who was born in South Taranaki, and whose descendants, if any, remained there. The Ngāti Maru of Hauraki say that he is the ancestor of the Ngāti Maru of Taranaki, but they themselves say he had a different parentage.
- Maru-tūahu, who married Pare-moeahu, daughter of Te Whata and had sons:

- Tama-te-pō, ancestor of Ngāti Rongoū
- Tama-te-rā, ancestor of Ngāti Tamaterā
- Whanaunga, ancestor of Ngāti Whanaunga
- According to Ngāti Maru tradition, Maru-tūahu also married Te Whata's elder daughter, Hine-rehua, and had Te Ngako or Te Ngakohua, ancestor of the Hauraki Ngāti Maru

Hotunui and Waitapu had one son:

- Pākā, who married Hine-rehua, daughter of Te Whata, according to Pei Te Hurinui Jones, and had a daughter, Kahu-reremoa, who herself married Taka-kōpiri, son of Rangitahi, of Te Arawa, whose daughter Tū-parahaki was an ancestor of Ngāti Hauā.

== Sources ==
A Tainui account of Hotunui is recorded by Pei Te Hurinui Jones but, unusually, he does not report his source. It also appears in S. Percy Smith's History and Traditions of the Maoris of the west coast North Island of New Zealand prior to 1840, published in 1910. Hauraki Ngāti Maru versions are recorded by George Grey in 1853 and by John White in 1888.

== Bibliography ==
- Graham, George (1949). "Pare Hauraki pare Waikato". Journal of the Polynesian Society. 58: 68–74.
- Jones, Pei Te Hurinui; Biggs, Bruce (2004). Ngā iwi o Tainui : nga koorero tuku iho a nga tuupuna = The traditional history of the Tainui people. Auckland [N.Z.]: Auckland University Press. ISBN 1869403312.
