= Tongātea =

Māori rangatira (chieftain)

Tongātea (or possibly Tongatea) was a Māori rangatira (chieftain) of Ngāti Ruanui, based at Pātea in southern Taranaki, New Zealand. He probably lived in the early sixteenth century.

== Life ==
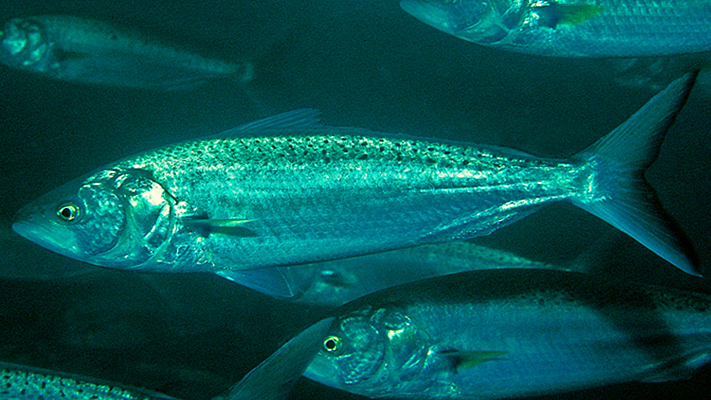
Kahawai.

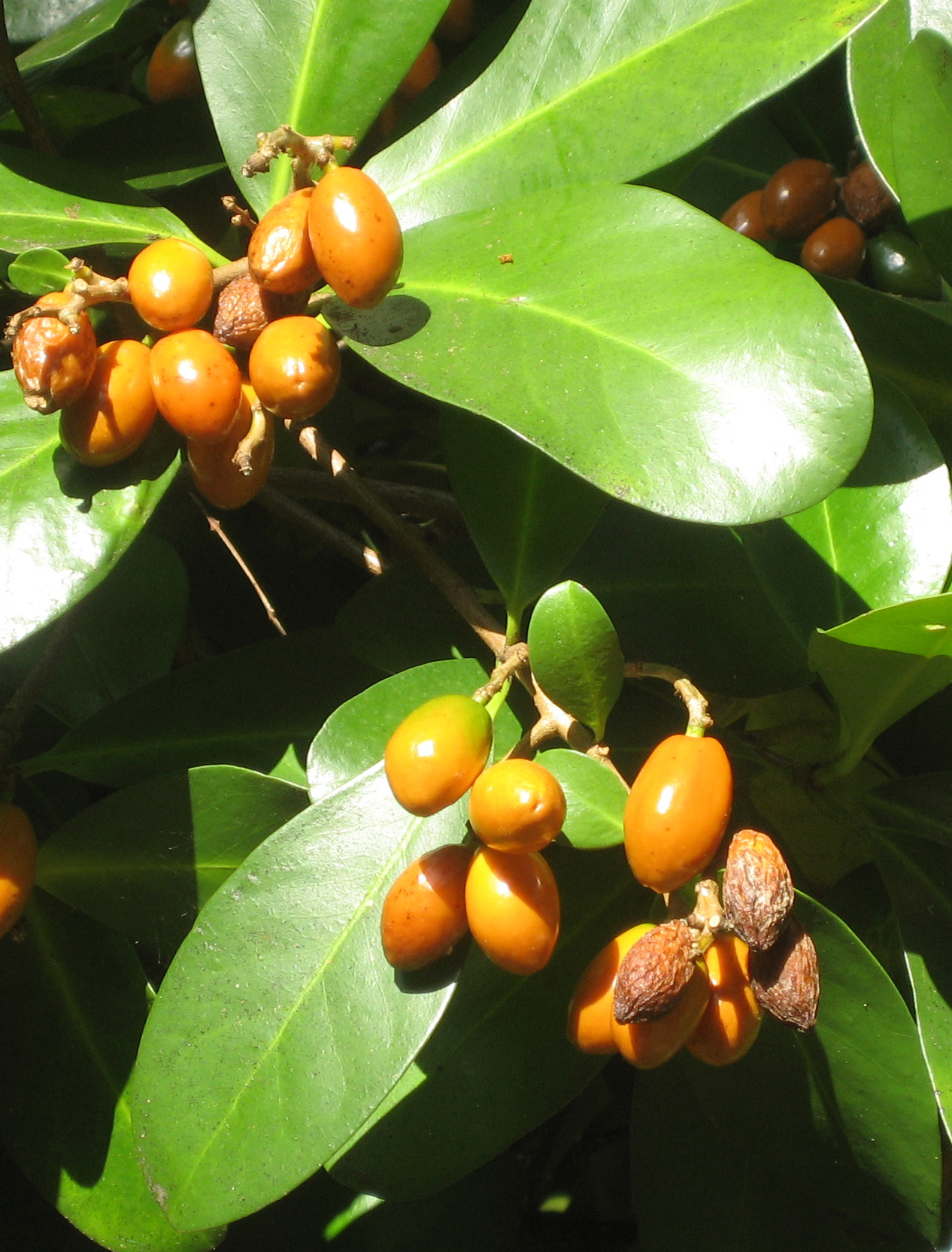
Karaka berries.

Tongātea was the son of Huetaepo and a direct descendant of Turi, the captain of the Aotea canoe. He had a sister, Rua-pū-tahanga, who married Whatihua, the rangatira of the northern part of Tainui, who was based at Kāwhia. When Rua-pū-tahanga gave birth to her first son, Uenuku-tuhatu, Tongātea set out from Pātea in order to carry out the tohi baptismal ritual, but at Marokopa he met and married a lady of Ngāti Awa, named Manu.

Tongātea established a mauri ika ('fish talisman') at Marokopa, which was believed to be responsible for the annual spawning of kahawai in the Marokopa River, which was still being fished according to traditional rules in 1932. After a while, Tongātea decided that it would be good to settle at Marokopa permanently, so he planned to return to Taranaki in order to gather a raiding party to seize the place. However, when he told Manu that he was leaving, she guessed the reason and told her brothers, who caught him on his way back to Pātea and killed him.

Tongātea was known as a greedy eater, who did not even bother to peel his kūmara and karaka before eating them. As a result, when Manu gave birth to his daughter after his death, she was named Peha-nui ('Many peelings'), but other versions give her name as Pēhā-nui. She was the mother of Manu-Tongātea.

== Source ==
Pei Te Hurinui Jones records the story of Tongātea based on an oral account which he heard from Āihe Huirama and Te Nguha Huirama of Ngāti Tamainupō, Ngāti Maniapoto, and Ngāti Te Ata in 1932.

== Bibliography ==
- Jones, Pei Te Hurinui; Biggs, Bruce (2004). Ngā iwi o Tainui : nga koorero tuku iho a nga tuupuna = The traditional history of the Tainui people. Auckland [N.Z.]: Auckland University Press. ISBN 1869403312.
