= Whatihua =

Whatihua was a Māori rangatira (chief) in the Tainui confederation of tribes, based at Kāwhia, New Zealand. He quarrelled with his brother, Tūrongo, and as a result Tainui was split between them, with Whatihua receiving the northern Waikato region, including Kāwhia. He probably lived in the early sixteenth century.

== Life ==
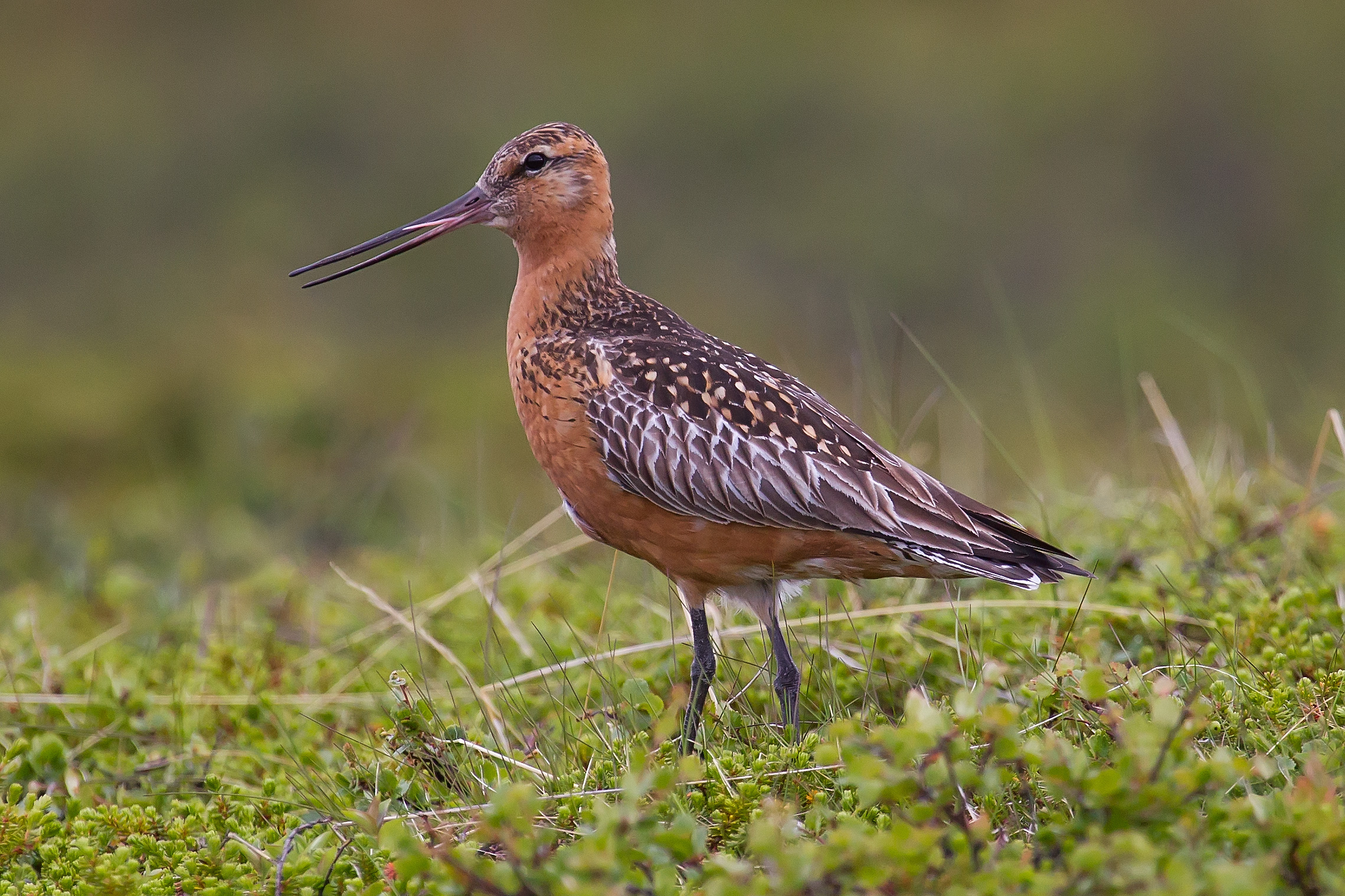
Kūaka (Bar-tailed godwit).

Whatihua was a male-line descendant of Hoturoa, leader of the Tainui waka through his father Tāwhao. Tāwhao married two daughters of Te Aorere, another descendant of Hoturoa, Pūnui-a-te-kore and Maru-tē-hiakina. Whatihua was the first-born son, but his mother was the younger of Tāwhao's wives, Maru-tē-hiakina. His younger brother Tūrongo was born to the senior wife, Pūnui-a-te-kore. As a result, the relative status of the two sons was unclear and they competed for pre-eminence.

As youths, Whatihua and Tūrongo went hunting kūaka (Bar-tailed godwits) on Kaiwhai island off Kāwhia. At first, all the birds came to Tūrongo and he caught great numbers, but while he was focussed on cooking the birds, Whatihua snuck up behind him and "snatched the hau" (the spiritual essence) from Tūrongo's head. After that all of Tūrongo's mana passed to Whatihua.

=== Courtship of Rua-pū-tahanga ===
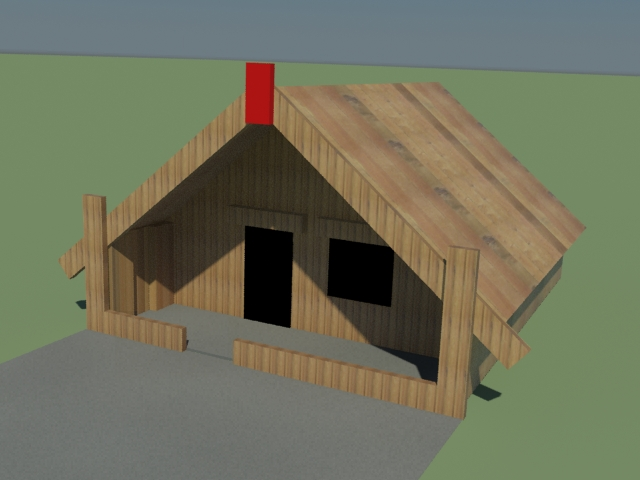
A diagram of a Māori wharenui ('meeting house'). The tāhuhu is the main beam which forms the ridge of the roof. In traditional Māori architecture, it symbolises the backbone.

When the two brothers reached adulthood, Tūrongo travelled south to Pātea and got engaged to Rua-pū-tahanga, of Ngāti Ruanui. He then returned to Kāwhia and began to build a house at Te Whare-o-Ngarue in Kāwhia in preparation for her arrival. As he was working on the house, Whatihua came and advised him that the planned house was too big, convincing him to shorten the tāhuhu (ridge beam) in order to complete the task on time. He also convinced him to plant huge gardens, using up all of his kumara, so that he had none remaining in his storerooms. Meanwhile, Whatihua at Te Wharenui ('The Big House') on the Aotea Harbour, where it is said that the outline of the house is still visible in the grass in the summer. While Tūrongo was waiting to harvest his kumara, Whatihua summoned Rua-pū-tahanga from Pātea.

Rua-pū-tahanga made the journey up the Whanganui River, through Tāngarākau, and Ōhura, into the Mokau Valley. The places Te Umu-Kaimata, Taorua, and Te Puna-a-Rua-pū-tahanga are named after events that took place on her journey. When she arrived at Kāwhia, Tūrongo had no food for her and his house was too small to fit all the people whom she had brought along with her, while Whatihua had plenty of food and space, so she married him instead. Beaten, Tūrongo left Kāwhia.

=== Division of the Waikato ===
After Tūrongo left Kāwhia, he had travelled east and married Māhina-o-rangi at Pukehou in Hawke's Bay. After the marriage had taken place, the elderly Tāwhao, travelled there and invited Tūrongo to return to Kāwhia. There he divided his lands between Whatihua and Tūrongo, roughly along the aukati line that later formed the northern boundary of the King Country. The north went to Whatihua, who remained at Kāwhia, while the south went to Tūrongo, who was sent inland and settled at Rangiātea, near Waikeria.

=== Departure of Rua-pū-tahanga ===
Whatihua and Rua-pū-tahanga had two sons, Uenuku-tuhatu and Uenuku-te-rangi-hōkā. Shortly after the birth of Uenuku-te-rangi-hōkā, Apakura, asked him to catch her an eel, so he went to Ōparau, where there was known to be a large eel, and caught it, using one of Rua-pū-tahanga's mauri (magic talismans). This so infuriated Rua-pū-tahanga that she left Kāwhia, taking the baby Uenuku-te-rangi-hōkā with her. After a while Whatihua noticed that she had gone and set off in pursuit. At the Matatua headland, she realised that Whatihua was following her and buried the baby in the sand up to his neck, so that Whatihua had to stop to uncover him and fetch people to take him back to the village. While he did this, Rua-pū-tahanga swum across the Kawhia Harbour, reaching the shore at Te Maika. From there, she passed Lake Taharoa, Taumatakanae, and Harihari, crossed the Marokopa River at the coast, crossed Kiri-te-here stream and reached the base of Mount Moeātoa, where cliffs extend right to the sea. She stopped to rest there and a small stream at the spot is named for the event, Te Mimi-o-Rua-pū-tahanga ('Rua-pū-tahanga's pee').

As she was resting, Whatihua caught up with her and there was nowhere to run, so Rua-pū-tahanga leapt off the cliffs into the roiling waves, where a taniwha, Rākei, picked her up and carried her away. She shouted to Whatihua, "Go back! You will die in your pursuit of my body, now set apart" or "The tides of Rākei of the hundred monster's eyes have risen," both now proverbial sayings. He returned to Kawhia.

=== Battle of Mahea-takataka ===
Mangō, a cousin of Whatihua who was based at Te Whena on the Kāwhia harbour, wanted a comb owned by Whatihua. He broke into Whatihua's house in the night and stole it, wandering around repeatedly so that the tracks would appear to belong to a large group of thieves. However, because of a crooked leg, Mangō had a distinctive gait and the tracks were easily identified as his in the morning. Whatihua led a war party of a thousand men to Te Whena to reclaim the comb, but Mangō attacked him with a force of nine hundred at Mahea-takataka. Whatihua's party was defeated and most of his men were killed, but Whatihua himself was captured alive and brought to Mangō, who grabbed him by his hair and urinated on his head. After this, Whatihua was allowed to go free, but the defeat had caused him to lose his mana and he was no longer seen as an important leader.

=== Death ===
Whatihua had made his base at the village of Manu-aitu. When he grew old he went out to a seaside cliff, which has a cave partway up called Poho-tangi ('sounding belly'), because of the sound it makes as the wind and waves crash against the cliff face. When the people saw Whatihua at the top of the cliff, some rushed to the top and others rushed to the bottom of the cliff, but he leapt off before they could get there. His body was not found at the base and it was believed that he had somehow ended up in the cave, which he had earlier predicted would be his tomb.

== Family ==
Whatihua married Rua-pū-tahanga and Apakura, but it is not certain which of them he married first.

Rua-pū-tahanga was a descendant of Turi, leader of the Aotea canoe. With Whatihua, she had two sons:

- Uenuku-tuhatu, probably the same as Uetapu, who had three sons and two daughters:

- Te-Ata-i-ōrongo, who married Rangi-waea and had one son, Kai-ihu
- Mania-ōrongo
- Tū-a-tangiroa, who had a daughter, Hine-au-Pounamu, who married Rereahu
- Māpau-inuhia and Waengarangi, who both married Huiao, son of Whāita and had three children, Tū-irirangi, Hine-moana, and Paiariki.

- Uenuku-te-rangi-hōkā, also called Uenuku-whāngai ('the adopted') because he was raised by Apakura, who had three sons:

- Tamāio
- Hotunui
- Mōtai, who married Hinewai, a daughter of Whatihua's brother Tūrongo, and had a son Kura-nui, whose daughter Rerei-ao married Pikiao, ancestor of Ngāti Pikiao, creating a link between Tainui and Te Arawa that was considered very important in Tainui whakapapa.

Apakura was descended from Tamatea, the captain of the Tākitimu canoe. Her children with Whatihua were the ancestors of Ngāti Apakura.

== Bibliography ==
- Jones, Pei Te Hurinui; Biggs, Bruce (2004). Ngā iwi o Tainui : nga koorero tuku iho a nga tuupuna = The traditional history of the Tainui people. Auckland [N.Z.]: Auckland University Press. ISBN 1869403312.
- White, John (1888). The Ancient History of The Maori, his Mythology and Traditions: Tai-Nui. Vol. 4. Wellington: Government Printer.
