= Pikiao =

New Zealand Māori chief (rangatira)

* Blue: Lake Rotorua; Black: Mount Pirongia.
- Red: Marae of Ngāti Pikiao of Te Arawa, Bay of Plenty.
- Olive: Marae of Ngāti Mahuta of Tainui, Waikato.
- Yellow: Marae of Ngāti Pāoa of Marutūāhu, Hauraki Gulf.

Pikiao was a Māori rangatira (chieftain) of the Te Arawa tribal confederation based at Lake Rotorua in the Bay of Plenty, New Zealand, who was the ancestor of Ngāti Pikiao in Te Arawa, of Ngāti Mahuta in the Tainui confederation, and of Ngāti Pāoa in the Marutūāhu confederation. He probably lived in the early seventeenth century.

== Life ==
Pikiao was the son of Kawatapu-a-rangi and, through him, a descendant of Tama-te-kapua, the captain of the Arawa canoe. As an adult, Pikiao settled at Owhata by Lake Rotorua.

=== Journey to Waikato ===
At Rotorua, he married Rakeiti and had a number of daughters, leading his father to despair of having male-line descendants. Rakeiti declared tera, Te Takapuwhaia te tuhera ("Te Takapuwhaia [a stream in Lake Rotoiti] is still open"), meaning that she still had time to bear a male child. This declaration has become a proverb. However, Pikiao chose instead to leave her and travel down the Waikato River to the Waipā River, from which he went on foot to Mount Pirongia, where he met and married Rerei-ao, a descendant of the brothers Whatihua and Tūrongo and through them of Hoturoa, captain of the Tainui canoe. The link thus created between Tainui and Te Arawa is highly valued in Tainui whakapapa. Pikiaio and Rerei-ao had one son, Hekemaru, ancestor of Ngāti Mahuta and Ngāti Pāoa of the Hauraki Gulf. Subsequently, Pikiao returned to Rakeiti in Rotorua and had another son, as Rakeiti had predicted.

=== Conflict with Tūtānekai ===
One of these sons, Morewhati, was given a shark's tooth earring called Tuperenui by Tūtānekai but traded it away for a feather cloak called Iringangarangi, so Tūtānekai killed him. At Mourea Morewhati's brother, Tamakari criticised Tūtānekai severely for this, so Tūtānekai killed him as well and stuck the heads of the brothers on two stakes which were used to mark fishing grounds on Lake Rotorua. These stakes came to be called Morewhati and Tamakari and were still in place until the late nineteenth century. A relative of Morewhati and Tamakari, Tiukahapa, convinced her husband Taharangi to allow her to go out in a canoe in the night, remove the two heads, and bring them back to Ngāti Pikiao. When Tūtānekai heard about this, he went to punish Tiukahapa, but Taharangi interceded and convinced Tūtānekai to let Tiukahapa go unpunished. After this, Ngāti Pikiao relocated from Owhata to Lake Rotokakahi and Lake Tarawera.

Claiming to be grateful to Tūtānekai for his forebearance with Tiukahapa, Ngāti Pikiao invited Tūtānekai and the people of Mokoia to come to Motutawa island on Lake Rotokakahi in order to agree a peace treaty. This was a ruse and the Mokoia people, led by Tūtānekai's father-in-law, Umukaria, were ambushed and killed at Rotokakahi. Tūtānekai got revenge by attacking Ngāti Pikiao's pā at Moura on Lake Tarawera. However, Pikiao and his followers were not at Moura when it was taken, but at Te Puwha on the eastern side of Tarawera. After the attack they moved to Matata, then to Otamarakau and Pukehina, before being invited to Te Puia on Rotoehu by Pikiao's friend Matarewha.

In his old age, he returned to Pirongia to live with Hekemaru and died there.

== Family ==
In Rotorua, Pikiao married Rakeiti and had several daughters before his journey to Waikato and sons after his return:

- Tamakari, who was killed by Tūtānekai:

- Pikiao (II):

- Te Tākinga, ancestor of the Ngāti Te Tākinga hapū, who married Hineora, daughter of Te Ra of Waitaha.
- Hinekura, ancestor of the Ngāti Hinekura hapū, who saved Te Tākinga at the Battle of Harakekengunguru.

- Puwhakaoho:

- Karaewahanui.

- Te Rangiunuora, ancestor of the Ngāti Te Rangiunuora hapū, who killed Whioi at the Battle of Harakekengunguru.

- Morewhati, who was killed by Tūtānekai.

At Pirongia, he married Rerei-ao and had one son:

- Hekemaru, who married Heke-i-te-rangi and had three children:

- Mahuta from whom Ngāti Mahuta of the Taupiri region in the Waikato are descended.
- Pāoa from whom Ngāti Pāoa of the Hauraki Gulf are descended.
- Pare-tahuri, mother of Takupu-o-te-rangi, and grand-mother of Kiri-ngaua, the wife of her grand-uncle Mahuta.

== Sources ==
D. M. Stafford records the Te Arawa traditional account of Pikiao. Pei Te Hurinui Jones reports a similar account of the begatting of Hekemaru, which he heard from many Tainui elders.

== Bibliography ==
- Jones, Pei Te Hurinui; Biggs, Bruce (2004). Ngā iwi o Tainui : nga koorero tuku iho a nga tuupuna = The traditional history of the Tainui people. Auckland [N.Z.]: Auckland University Press. ISBN 1869403312.
- Stafford, Don (1967). Te Arawa;: A history of the Arawa people. Wellington [N.Z.]: Reed. ISBN 9780947506100.
