= Kai-ihu =

Kai-ihu (or possibly Kaihū) was a Māori rangatira (chief) in the Tainui confederation of tribes, based at Kāwhia, New Zealand. He is best known for his part in a raid on Te Huaki in revenge for the murder of his father, Te-Ata-i-ōrongo. He probably lived in the early seventeenth century.

== Sources ==
The earliest record of the story is a manuscript from the collection of Governor George Grey (GNZMMSS 31) composed sometime before 1854. Elsdon Best records a version which he was told in 1894 by Te Karehana Whakataki of Ngāti Toa. A version by Wirihana Te Aoterangi, a chief from Raglan who died in 1907, forms the basis of the account by Pei Te Hurinui Jones.

== Life ==
Kai-ihu was a male-line descendant of Hoturoa, leader of the Tainui waka through his father Te-Ata-i-ōrongo, son of Uetapu / Uenuku-tuhatu, the son of Whatihua.

=== Murder of Te-Ata-i-ōrongo ===
Te-Ata-i-ōrongo married Rangi-waea who came from Ōkoro but had been raised at Tairutu near Te Ākau. He came to join her there and Rangi-waea soon became pregnant. During this time, Te-Ata-i-ōrongo went fishing with Rangi-waea's brother. This brother is called Horeta in the version recorded by Wirihana Te Aoterangi and Pei Te Hurinui Jones, but in the Grey manuscript and the version recorded by Elsdon Best he is instead Rākapa-whare, the paramount chief of the tribes of the lower Waikato River. According to Te Aoterangi and Jones only Te-Ata-i-ōrongo caught any fish, so the brother tricked Te-Ata-i-ōrongo into diving down to unhitch his fish-hook from a rock and then pulled on the line so that it smashed the rock into Te-Ata-i-ōrongo's forehead, killing him. The brother abandoned the body in the sea and told Rangi-waea that he had no knowledge of Te-Ata-i-ōrongo's whereabouts.

In the night, the wairua (ghost) of Te-Ata-i-ōrongo appeared to Rangi-waea in the form of a disembodied hand, told her of the murder and encouraged her to flee to Kāwhia. The ghostly hand led Rangi-waea on the journey, via Te Iringa, Tapuae-haruru, Ōtakahi, Raglan harbour, Rangipū, Rua-o-te-ata, Kōrero-maiwaho, across Papa-i-ōrongo stream and into Kawhia harbour, where her father-in-law Uetapu had a settlement at Tokatapu. A very similar story about a ghostly hand is told about Tūheitia and his wife Te Ata.

In Pei Te Hurinui Jones' version, Horeta was abused by the people of his village for his crime and the vengeance that it would bring upon them, and eventually he committed suicide by throwing himself off a cliff.

=== Raid on Te Huaki ===
Kai-ihu was born at Tokatapu and his grandfather, Uetapu, carried out the tohi baptismal ritual, making him tapu against any sharp object touching his head. As a result of this, his head was covered in lice. Uetapu taught Kai-ihu karakia spells and how to fight with weapons. Meanwhile, plans were made for the construction of a waka (canoe) so that the tribe could undertake an expedition to get revenge (utu) for the murder of Te-Ata-i-ōrongo.

When the waka was ready, the leaders of expedition decided not to take Kai-ihu, because he was too young, but when they set off in the canoe, the waves prevented them from leaving Kawhia harbour two days in a row. On the third, Kai-ihu hid in the base of the canoe and when it reached the sea, he leapt up and sang a tauparapara. Different versions of this chant are given by different authorities. Pei Te Hurinui Jones records it as the same chant sung by Ngātoro-i-rangi to enable the Tainui canoe to leave Hawaiki. Wirihana Te Aoterangi gives a set of three separate chants.

The war party now headed for Te Huaki, the base of Rākapa-whare. They landed by night at Te Muruwai creek. The war party dammed the stream while they dragged the canoe ashore and then released the water so that their footsteps were washed away. Then they concealed the waka with seaweed. At dawn, the people of Te Huaki paddled out in canoes to fish and the war party suddenly launched their waka, bore down upon Rākapa-whare's canoe and killed everyone aboard. Rākapa-whare himself leapt into the water and tried to hide under his canoe, but Kai-ihu found him and killed him.

== Bibliography ==
- Jones, Pei Te Hurinui; Biggs, Bruce (2004). Ngā iwi o Tainui : nga koorero tuku iho a nga tuupuna = The traditional history of the Tainui people. Auckland [N.Z.]: Auckland University Press. ISBN 1869403312.
