= Tāwhao =

New Zealand Māori chief, circa 1500

Tāwhao was a Māori rangatira (chief) in the Tainui confederation of tribes, based at Kāwhia, New Zealand. He probably lived around 1500 CE. He was the last chief to lead the whole of Tainui, as the feud between his two sons Whatihua and Tūrongo led him to divide it into northern and southern sections.

== Life ==
Tāwhao was a male-line descendant of Hoturoa, leader of the Tainui waka through his father Kākāti. According to Jones, the line of descent is Hoturoa, Hotuope, Hotuāwhio, Hotumatapū, Mōtai, Ue (who married Kahupeka), Rakamaomao, and Kākāti. His mother was Ururangi, a descendant of Taumauri from the Kurahaupō waka. He was born at Kāwhia and had one older brother, Koro-te-whao, about whom nothing is recorded, and a younger half-brother, Tuhianga, who had further descendants, including Haumia and Kaihamu.

As a young man, Tāwhao moved to Whāingaroa (Raglan), where he married Pūnui-a-te-kore, daughter of Te Aorere, another descendant of Hoturoa. After his marriage, Tāwhao fell in love with his wife's younger sister, Maru-tē-hiakina, who lived at Hōrea on the other side of Whāingaroa harbour. Tāwhao caught her attention by making a small raft out of raupō rushes, fastening his ivory cloak-pin (aurei) to it, and floating the raft across the harbour to Maru-tē-hiakina using a karakia. When Maru-tē-hiakina picked up the raft and saw the cloak-pin, she instantly fell in love with Tāwhao and went to marry him.

Tāwhao returned to Kāwhia with both wives pregnant. Maru-tē-hiakina gave birth first, to a boy named Whatihua, and then Pūnui-a-te-kore gave birth to a son called Tūrongo. Because Whatihua was the first-born but Tūrongo was son of the senior wife, the relative status of the two sons was unclear and they competed for pre-eminence. Eventually, the conflict led Tūrongo to leave Kāwhia and settle at Pukehou in the southern Hawke's Bay Region.

In his old age, Tāwhao travelled to Pukehou and invited Tūrongo to return to Kāwhia. There he divided his lands between Whatihua and Tūrongo, roughly along the aukati line that later formed the northern boundary of the King Country. The north went to Whatihua, who remained at Kāwhia, while the south went to Tūrongo, who was sent inland and settled at Rangiātea, near Waikeria.
