= Tāngarākau River =

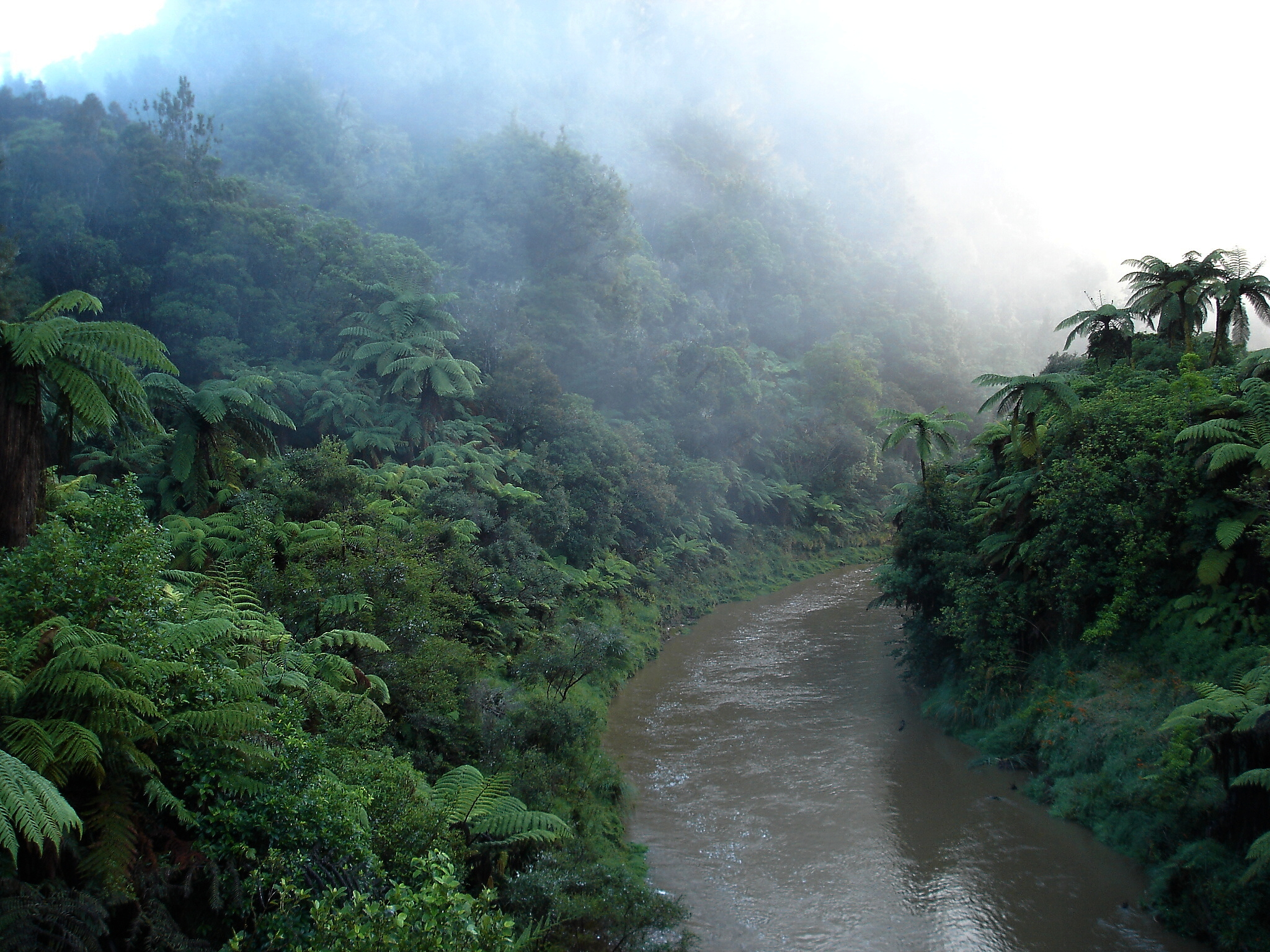
- Mist hanging low over the Tāngarākau River
- Native name: Tāngarākau (Māori)

Location
- Country: New Zealand
- Region: Manawatū-Whanganui
- Settlements: Tāngarākau

Physical characteristics
- Source
  - location: 8 km (5.0 mi) west of Ōhura
  - coordinates: 38°50′11″S 174°53′14″E
  - elevation: 470 m (1,540 ft)
- Mouth
  - location: Whanganui River
  - coordinates: 39°14′17″S 174°52′52″E
  - elevation: 85 m (279 ft)
- Length: 94 km (58 mi)

Basin features
- Progression: Tāngarākau River → Whanganui River
- River system: Whanganui River

The Tāngarākau River is a river of the Manawatū-Whanganui region of New Zealand's North Island. It flows south for 94 km (58 mi) from its source 8 km (5.0 mi) west of Ōhura in the King Country to reach the Whanganui River. State Highway 43, known as the Forgotten World Highway, travels through the Tāngarākau Gorge.

== Bridges ==
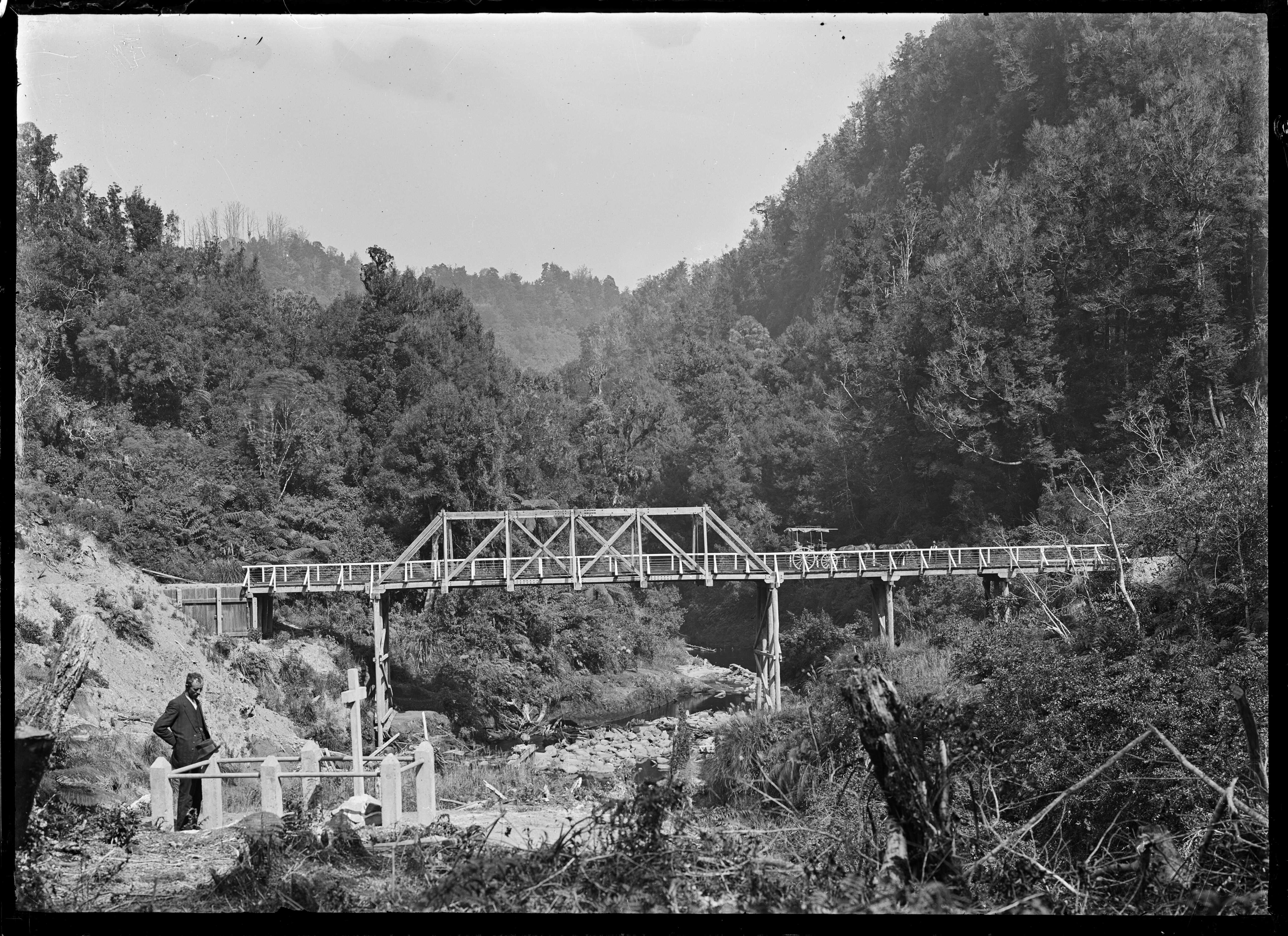
Road bridge through Tāngarākau Gorge and gravesite for surveyor beneath it, circa.1916

As the river flows mainly through remote areas there are only five bridges across the river along its entire length.

- In the upper reaches in the Waitaanga Forest there is a swing bridge on the Tatu Track
- State Highway 43 crosses the river three times as it winds through Tāngarākau Gorge
- A rail bridge on the Stratford–Okahukura Line crosses the river at the small settlement of Tāngarākau

== See also ==
- List of rivers of New Zealand
