= Turi (Māori ancestor) =

Māori mythological captain

Turi, according to Māori tradition, was the captain of the Aotea canoe and an important ancestor for many Māori iwi, particularly in the Taranaki region.

== Arrival in New Zealand ==
Turi was a vassal to chief Uenuku of Hawaiki. One year, after Turi's tribute to Uenuku was insufficient as the annual harvest was not as plentiful as usual, Uenuku killed Turi's son Potikiroroa for food supply. Turi's father Rongotea retaliated by killing Awepotiki, the son of Uenuku, and hiding his heart inside a kūmara (sweet potato) tribute to Uenuku. The conflict led Turi and his people to depart for New Zealand with many others in the Aotea. This canoe had been given to Turi by Toto, father of Turi's wife Rongorongo. In some traditions, Turi and his party stopped at Rangitāhua, believed by some to be Raoul of the Kermadec Islands, where they encountered some of the crew from the Kurahaupō canoe. Continuing, Turi and his followers eventually arrived and settled at Aotea Harbour on the west coast of the North Island.

After some time at Aotea Harbour, Turi settled the Pātea region, where he lived with his people along Pātea River. His daughter Tāneroroa married Ruanui, the eponymous ancestor of Ngāti Ruanui.
