= Hoturoa =

Polynesian Māori migration leader

According to Māori tradition, Hoturoa was the leader of the Tainui canoe, during the migration of the Māori people to New Zealand, around 1400. He is considered the founding ancestor of the Tainui confederation of tribes (iwi), who now inhabit the central North Island.

== Voyage to New Zealand ==
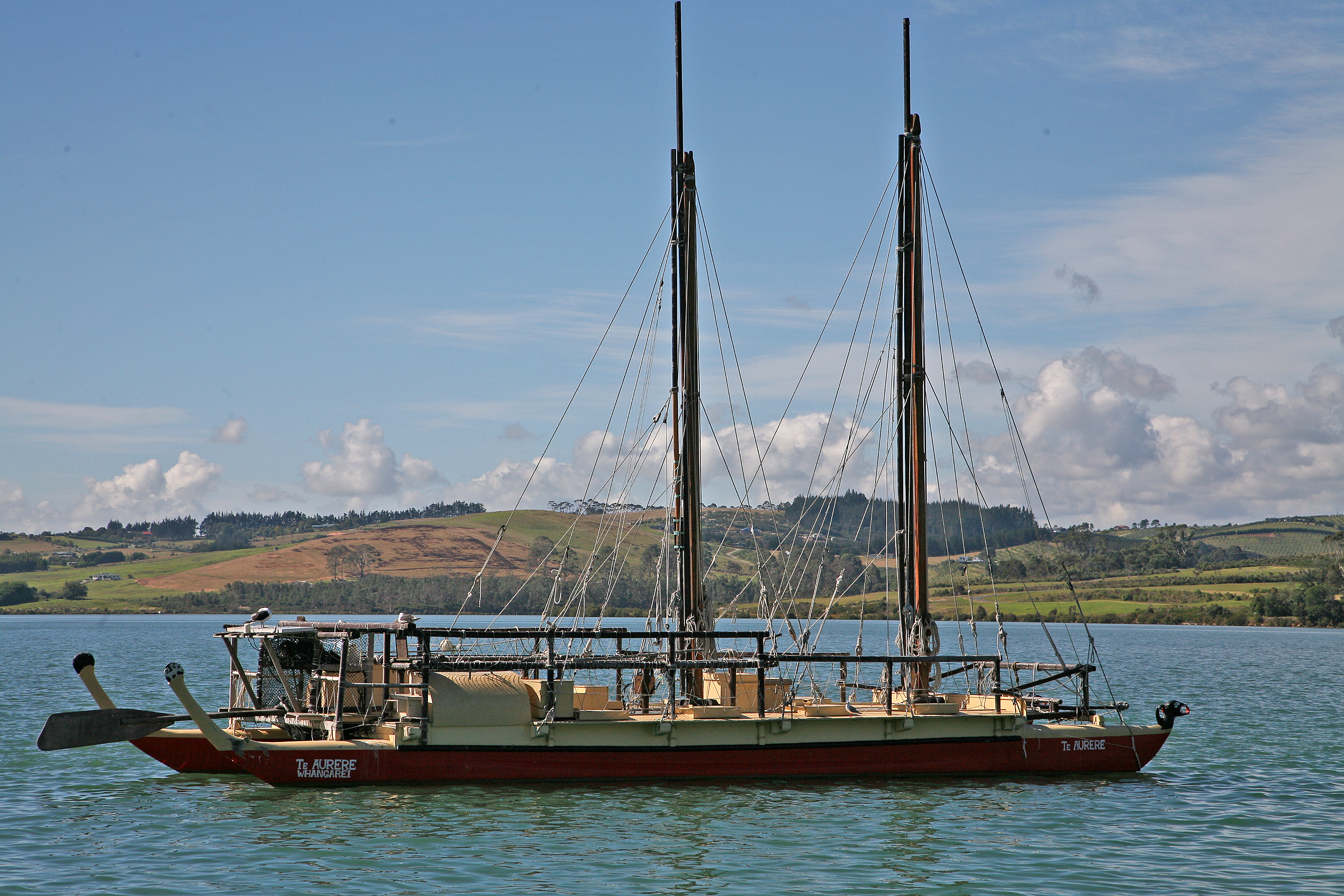
Te Aurere, a modern reconstruction of a sea-going waka (canoe).

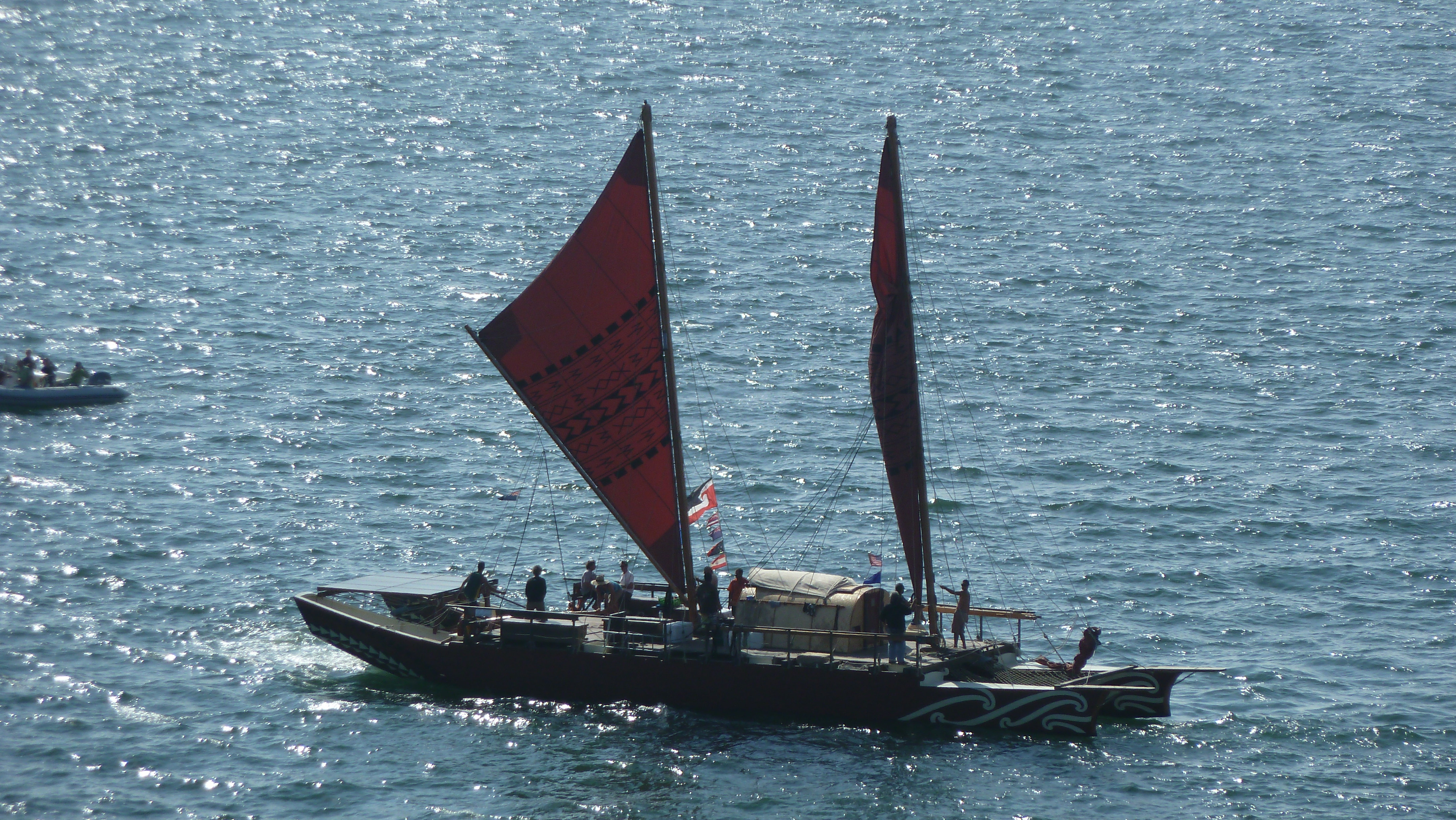
Te Haunui, a modern reconstruction of a sea-going waka (canoe).

According to Māori tradition, Hoturoa was a leader in Hawaiki, an unlocated territory somewhere in Polynesia. Because over-population had led to famine and warfare, Hoturoa decided to leave Hawaiki and he commissioned Rakatāura, an expert boat builder in the tradition of Rātā (or according to Wirihana Aoterangi by Rātā himself) to build the Tainui waka According to Pei Te Hurinui Jones the waka was named Tainui because when it first went into the water, it did not ride smoothly and one of Hoturoa's wives, perhaps Marama, shouted out "Hoturoa, your canoe is tainui ('very heavy')".

Tainui was one of the last waka to leave Hawaiki for New Zealand. It departed on Uenuku's night, the fourth night in the month of Hakihea (roughly December). When the people warned Hoturoa that this period of the month, Tamatea (the new moon), is characterised by wind and storms, he said, "Let me and Tamatea fight it out at sea!" The ship visited many Pacific islands before arriving in New Zealand, at Whangaparaoa Bay in the Bay of Plenty.

The other waka had arrived before Tainui, but their crews had gone out to investigate the land. Hoturoa built a tuahu (altar) and had the anchor rope of Tainui placed beneath that of the other waka. When the other crews returned, Hoturoa pointed to these things as evidence that Tainui had actually arrived first. This incident is the subject of much dispute between Tainui and Arawa.

From there, the ship travelled west, around the Coromandel peninsula to the Tāmaki isthmus (modern Auckland), where they heard of another sea to the west. Hoturoa's wife, Marama-kiko-hura, decided to make the crossing by land, planning to meet up with the rest of the crew at Ōtāhuhu. As she went, she sang the 'karakia urūru-whenua' ('the incantation for entering new lands') and carried the Tainui's treasures. Continuing on, Tainui passed Motutapu island and fetched up at Takapuna in the Waitematā Harbour. There, Taikehu encouraged Hoturoa to go out and look for the sea to the west. When Hoturoa returned he said he had seen grey mullet leaping in the waves, known thereafter as 'pōtiki a Taikehu' (Taikehu's children).

Hoturoa decided that Tāmaki was overpopulated and that they could carry on in search of new lands. According to one tradition, reported by Aoterangi, they carried the waka overland to Manukau Harbour on the west coast at Ōtāhuhu, after rendezvousing with Marama-kiko-hura there. As they hauled the canoe across the isthmus on rollers, however, it stuck and would not move. The tohunga Riutiuka reported that this was because Marama-kiko-hura had violated tapu with one of the crew or with a local man during her journey. Repeating the special incantation the Hoturoa had used to haul Tainui into the sea in Hawaiki, they were able to get the canoe moving.

== Quarrel between Hoturoa and Rakatāura ==
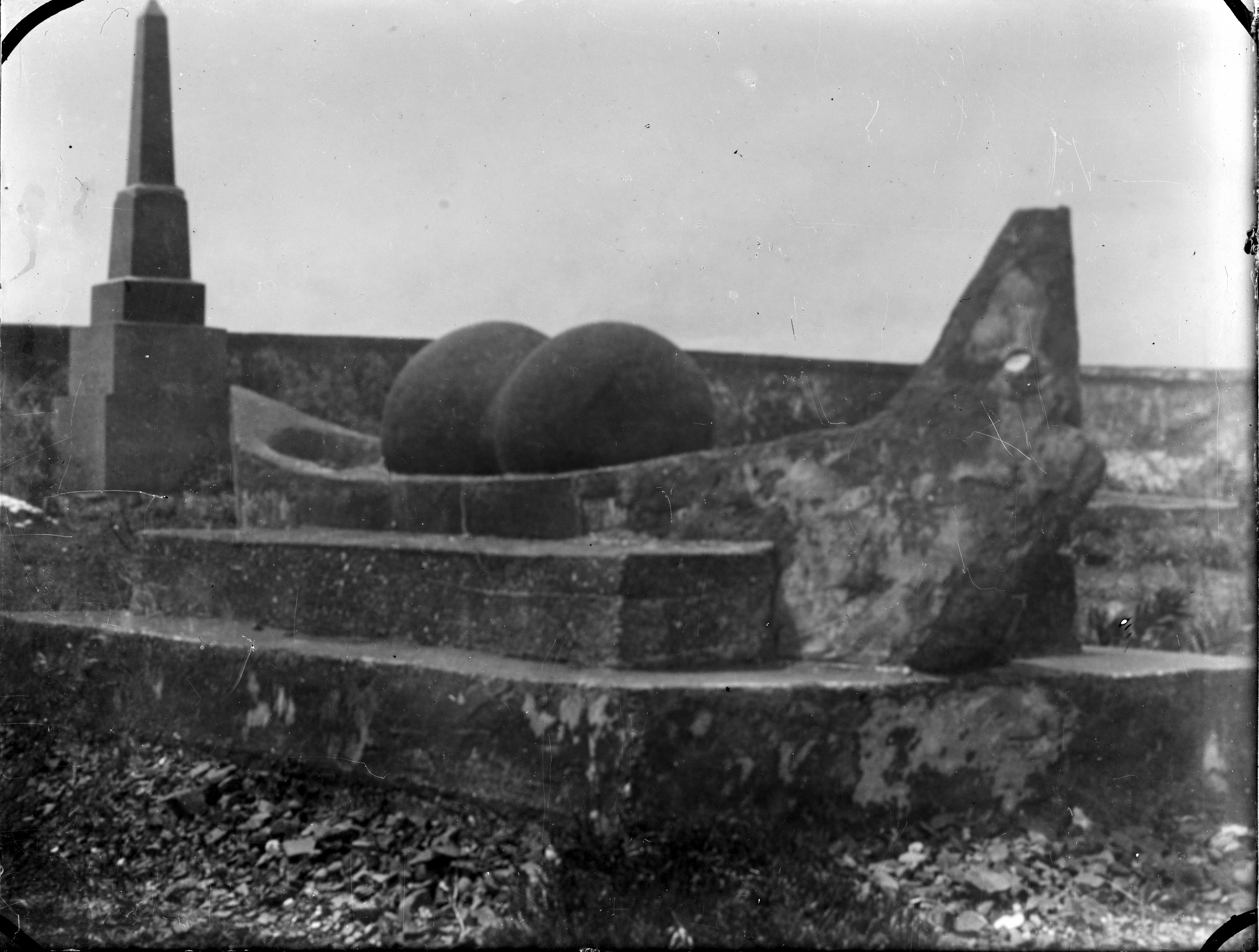
Stone anchor of Tainui at the mouth of the Mōkau river.

According to another tradition, however, it was Rakatāura who was to sing the special incantation, but when he was about to do so, his sister Hiaroa abused him for helping Hoturoa when the latter had refused to allow him to marry Hoturoa's daughter Kahukeke. As a result, Rakatāura left the crew and Hoturoa had to sail Tainui all the way around Northland. At Mount Roskill or Puketutu Island, Rakatāura and Hiaroa lit a fire and sung incantations to prevent Tainui from entering the Manukau Harbour. Then Rakatāura and Hiaroa went south, climbed up Karioi Mountain, and sung incantations to prevent Tainui from entering Raglan harbour. Again, they sang incantations at Ngairo to prevent Tainui from entering Aotea Harbour or Kāwhia Harbour.

At the mouth of the Mimi river, Hoturoa brought Tainui to shore and planted a pōhutukawa tree, which was still living as of 1912, though it was chopped down by the local New Zealand council government in 1915. The area had already been settled by one of Hoturoa's relatives, Awangaiariki from the Tokomaru waka, so they turned around and began to head north once more. At the mouth of the Mōkau river, Hoturoa disembarked and travelled north by land. At Whareorino he encountered Rakatāura and they reconciled.

Together, they brought Tainui in to Kāwhia harbour and hauled it ashore. Hoturoa set up an altar on the site, called Puna-whakatupu-tangata ('The Source of Mankind') and Rakatāura set up one called Hani. The waka was buried at Maketū marae, where it remains to this day.

== Settlement at Kāwhia ==
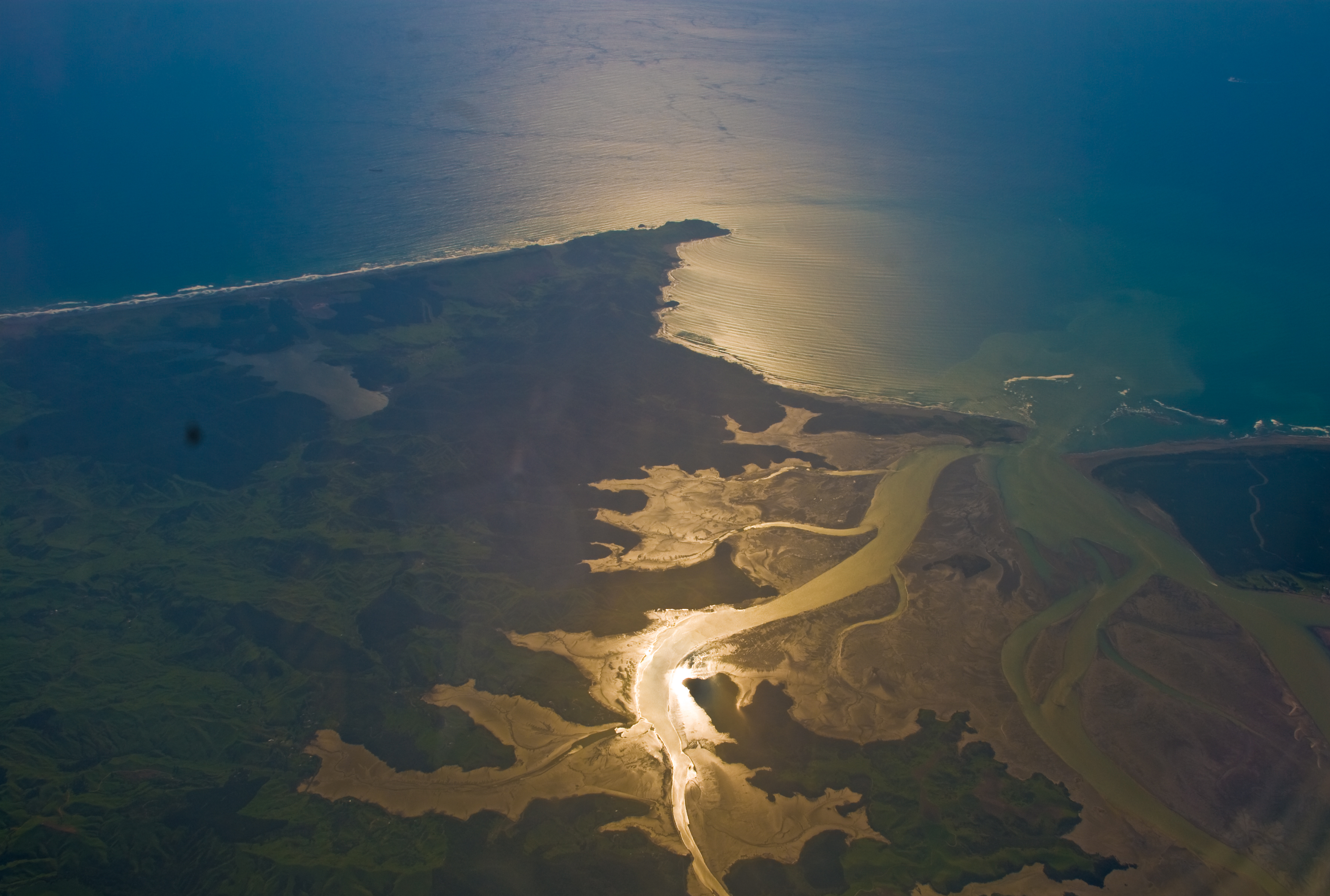
Aerial view of Kāwhia Harbour.

At Kāwhia, Hoturoa established settlements at Maketū, Paringa-a-tai, Motungaio, Ōmiti, and Te Puru, laying out gardens of taro, hue, and kūmara, which had been brought from Hawaiki by his wife Whakaotirangi. Hoturoa disavowed his senior wife, Whakaotirangi, in favour of his younger wife Marama-kiko-hura. Whakaotirangi withdrew to Pākarikari, where she established a kūmara garden. Hoturoa was summoned to Pākarikari by the false news that Whakaotirangi was dying and when he saw the kūmara he wept and reconciled with her.

Hoturoa now neglected Marama-kiko-hura, believing that her infant son Tānenui was not actually his son, but the product of an affair. One day, while Marama-kiko-hura was away, Tānenui would not stop crying, so Hoturoa stuck his penis in the baby's mouth. When Marama-kiko-hura returned, she realised what had happened and departed with Tānenui for Tāmaki (Auckland), where Tānenui had descendants.

Hoturoa died at Kāwhia.

== Family ==
Hoturoa was the son of Auau-te-rangi and Kuotepo. He had two younger brothers, Hotunui, who accompanied him on Tainui, and Pūmai-te-rangi, who remained in Hawaiki. More distantly, he was related to Tama-te-kapua, leader of the Arawa canoe and founder of Te Arawa confederation of tribes, based in Rotorua and the Bay of Plenty.

He married twice. His first wife was Whakaotirangi, whom he married in Hawaiki and who accompanied him on Tainui. They had several sons and a daughter:

- Poutūkeka, who married Te Amonga and Takahi-roa, and had a son with the former, Hāpopo, all of whom travelled on Tainui, and settled in Tāmaki (modern Auckland)
- Hotuope, who travelled on Tainui with his wife Hine-ihi, daughter of his uncle Pūmai-te-rangi, and was the ancestor of the main line of Tainui. According to Jones, the line is as follows: Hotuope (married Hine-ihi), Hotuāwhio, Hotumatapū (married Hineraku), Mōtai (married Pare-a-uru), Ue (married Kahupeka), Rakamaomao (married Tai-aroha), Kākāti (married Ururangi), and Tāwhao, after whom the line splits.
- Hotuāwhio, who travelled on Tainui, is sometimes a son of Hoturoa, but usually a son of Hotuope and Hine-ihi and ancestor of the Tainui main line.
- Kapa-a-rangi, ancestor of a separate line which was reunited with the main line by the marriage of Pūnui-a-te-kore and Maru-tē-hiakina to Tāwhao.
- Kahukeke, who travelled on Tainui and married the tohunga Rakatāura, and had descendants including Kahupeka who married Ue of the Tainui main line.

His second wife was Marama-kiko-hura (Marama of the bare flesh) or Marama-hahake (Marama the naked), whom he married in Hawaiki. She accompanied him on Tainui but he repudiated her after settling in Kāwhia. They had one son whose legitimacy was questioned:

- Tānenui, born at Kāwhia, who had descendants in Tāmaki (modern Auckland)

== Bibliography ==
- Foster, Bernard John (1966). McLintock, Alexander Hare (ed.). "Hoturoa". An encyclopaedia of New Zealand, edited by A. H. McLintock, 1966.
- Jones, Pei Te Hurinui; Biggs, Bruce (2004). Ngā iwi o Tainui : nga koorero tuku iho a nga tuupuna = The traditional history of the Tainui people. Auckland [N.Z.]: Auckland University Press. pp. 16–50. ISBN 1869403312.
- Walker, Ranginui (2004). "Nga Korero o Nehera". Ka Whawhai Tonu Matou - Struggle Without End (Second ed.). Auckland, New Zealand: Penguin Books. p. 46. ISBN 9780143019459.
