= Pei Te Hurinui Jones =

Ngāti Maniapoto leader, interpreter, land officer, writer, translator, genealogist

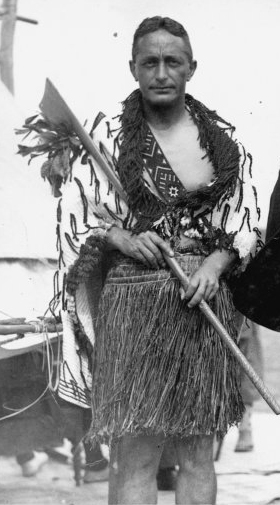
- Pei Te Hurinui Jones, circa 1930
- Born: 9 September 1898; Harataunga, Thames/Coromandel, New Zealand
- Died: 7 May 1976 (aged 77); Taumarunui, King Country, New Zealand
- Occupations: Political leader, writer, genealogist, historian
- Notable work: Ngā Mōteatea; Nga Iwi o Tainui
- Political party: New Zealand National Party
- Spouses: Hepina Te Miha Teri; Kate Huia Apatari
- Parent(s): David Lewis (father); Pare Te Kōrae (mother); Te Hurinui Te Wano (foster-father)
- Relatives: Michael Rotohiko Jones (brother)

Pei Te Hurinui Jones OBE (9 September 1898 – 7 May 1976) was a Māori political leader, writer, genealogist, and historian. As a leader of the Tainui tribal confederation and of the Māori King Movement, he participated in negotiations with the New Zealand Government, seeking compensation for land seizures, served on several boards, and authored a number of works in Māori and English, including the first history of the Tainui people.

== Early life ==
Jones's mother was Pare Te Kōrae of the Ngāti Maniapoto tribe. His father, David Lewis, was a Pākehā storekeeper of Jewish descent at Poro-o-Tarāo, between Te Kūiti and Taumarunui. They had two sons, Michael Rotohiko Jones ('Mick'), born 1895, and Pei, who was born 9 September 1898 in Harataunga, on the Coromandel Peninsula. Lewis went to the Second Boer War and did not return to New Zealand afterwards. Pare Te Kōrae remarried to David Jones, of Ngā Puhi, and both sons adopted their step-father's surname. They moved to Te Kawakawa, a small village near Ongarue, where Te Hurinui Te Wano, Pei's "grand-uncle", the cousin of his maternal grandfather, acted as his foster-father, "profoundly affecting the rest of his life". Te Hurinui Te Wano died in 1911 and Pare Te Kōrae in 1915.

Jones was known as 'the child with significant dreams' because he was troubled by night terrors that the tribe believed to have a supernatural element. Two ceremonies were undertaken to cure him of these dreams, which "confirmed a commitment to his traditional Māori heritage.

Jones had very limited formal education. He was enrolled at Wesley Training College in 1913, but attended rarely, and was largely self-taught.

== Political career ==
In 1920, Jones joined the Maori Affairs Department, working first at Whanganui and then as Land Title Consolidation Officer in Auckland. Because he was Māori, he was not allowed to hold any position with financial responsibility, which eventually led him to leave the department.

Pei, along with his brother Michael Rotohiko, and Leslie George Kelly, was involved in the Kingitanga, as an advisor to Te Puea of Turangawaewae, the Māori King Korokī Mahuta and his daughter and successor, Queen Te Atairangikaahu. He considered himself senior in his genealogical ties to Te Puea with whom he worked. Te Puea referred to the Jones brothers as "those bloody Hurai" ('Jews'), as their father was Jewish.

In 1928, the Sim Native Land Confiscation commission recommended that Tainui should be compensated for the land confiscations that followed the invasion of the Waikato in 1863. This initiated a long series of negotiations, in which Jones served as a representative of the Kingitanga, culminating in the Waikato-Maniapoto Maori Claims Settlement Act 1946. Jones served as first chairman of the Tainui Maori Trust Board, established by the act to receive and administer funds received from the New Zealand government. He was involved with the Māori Land Court, and with the consolidation of Māori land, and with the development of Māori land in the King Country, principally through the establishment in 1945 of the Puketapu Incorporation, which managed logging, timber milling, and sheep farms in the Taumarunui region, on behalf of Māori shareholders. It was sold to the Kauri Timber Company in 1960. Jones was the second president of the New Zealand Māori Council, a board member of the Maniapoto District Maori Council, and the Taumarunui Borough Council.

Jones was a strong National Party advocate. He stood for Parliament several times between 1930 and 1963. In 1930 he stood as an independent in the 1930 by-election for Western Maori. In the 1938 election, when he stood as an independent in the Western Maori electorate (with National Party support), he came second after Labour's Toko Ratana. He stood as the National Party candidate for Western Maori in 1943, 1945 by-election, 1957, 1960 and 1963, although a newspaper report said he was "Unofficial Labour" in 1943.

In the 1961 Queen's Birthday Honours, Jones was appointed an Officer of the Order of the British Empire, for services to the Māori people.

== Writings ==
Jones wrote extensively in Māori and English. He wrote the first Māori translations of Shakespeare's The Merchant of Venice, Julius Caesar, and Othello, as well as Edward FitzGerald's Rubaiyat of Omar Khayyam. He completed Ngā Mōteatea, a collection of Māori songs begun by Āpirana Ngata, producing nearly all of the English translations. In English he wrote King Pōtatau, a historical novel on Pōtatau Te Wherowhero, the first Māori king. He was also a frequent contributor to the Journal of the Polynesian Society and Te Ao Hou / The New World. Jones served as chairman of the Māori Dictionary Revision Committee, which revised Henry Williams' Dictionary of the New Zealand Language (1844, 1852, 1871), and was appointed to the New Zealand Geographic Board for expertise in Māori language and history.

Jones was very invested in the traditions and whakapapa (genealogy) of Tainui and wrote the first history of the Tainui people, in Māori. He began collecting material from oral sources in the late 1920s, publishing Māhinārangi, an account of the construction of the Māhinārangi meeting house at Turangawaewae marae in 1929. By 1936, Jones had produced a manuscript that covered Tainui history from the arrival of the Tainui canoe in New Zealand, until the early nineteenth century. In 1943, when Jones was suffering from cancer and expected to die, he gave the manuscript to Leslie George Kelly to produce a typescript. Kelly subsequently incorporated the material into his 1949 book Tainui: The Story of Hoturoa and his Descendants, without attribution. Jones published a short text in 1950, "Te Korero o Tainui". He drafted a complete manuscript in the 1970s with the assistance of G. H. Rowell. After his death, the manuscript was edited by Bruce Biggs and published as Nga Iwi o Tainui in 1995, with notes and facing English translation. Dame Te Atairangikaahu said "we look upon these words as the living presence of our tuupuna [ancestors] and so they are a living taaonga [sic] for us all." He also published numerous pamphlets regarding the foundations of specific marae.

He was awarded an honorary degree by Waikato University in 1968 to recognise his major contribution to Waikato Tainui literature and development. Jones's 1945 translation of Shakespeare’s The Merchant of Venice was filmed in 2002, and released as The Maori Merchant of Venice. In 2025 King Pōtatau was recognised as one the 180 most significant works of Māori-authored non-fiction.

== Personal life ==
Jones met his first partner, Hepina Te Miha Teri of Ngāti Tūwharetoa, around 1916 and married her in hospital in Hāwera on 16 October 1943 while he was suffering from cancer. They adopted three children. Hepina died in December 1957 at Whakarewa on Māhia Peninsula. He married for a second time to Kate Huia Apatari in Palmerston North on 6 January 1958.

Jones died at Taumarunui on 7 May 1976 and is buried at Te Tōkanga-nui-a-noho marae in Te Kūiti next to his foster father, Te Hurinui Te Wano.

== Works ==
- Jones, Pei Te Hurinui (1995). Nga Iwi o Tainui: The Traditional History of the Tainui People / Nga Koorero Tuku Iho a Nga Tuupuna. Edited and annotated by Bruce Biggs. Auckland: Auckland University Press.
