= Ngāti Raukawa–Ngāti Kahu-pungapunga War =

17th-century conflict in New Zealand

Date	Mid-seventeenth century
Location	Upper Waikato River, New Zealand
Result	Ngāti Raukawa victory; Ngāti Raukawa gain upper Waikato River

Belligerents
Ngāti Raukawa	Ngāti Kahu‑pungapunga Te Arawa

Commanders and leaders
Whāita; Tama-te-hura; Pipito; Wairangi; Upoko-iti	Parahore / Purahore

The Ngāti Raukawa–Ngāti Kahu-pungapunga War was a conflict between the Ngāti Raukawa iwi of Tainui and Ngāti Kahu-pungapunga in the Waikato region of New Zealand in the mid-seventeenth century, which resulted in Tainui's acquisition of the upper Waikato River. This marked the final destruction of all non-Tainui people within the Waikato region.

== Sources ==
A detailed account of the war was published by Walter Edward Gudgeon in the 1893 issue of the Journal of the Polynesian Society, with no indication of the sources on which it is based. It is also recorded by Pei Te Hurinui Jones, based on oral testimony given at the Māori Land Court at Cambridge in a dispute over ownership of Waotū. A similar account was given by Hōri Wirihana of Ngāti Kauwhata in evidence to the Māori Land Court at Ōtorohanga on 17 August 1886. D. M. Stafford records Arawa traditions derived from testimony given to the Māori Land Court by Hamuera Pango and Te Rangikāheke and other unnamed sources. Some events are mentioned in F. L. Phillips' Nga Tohu a Tainui / Landmarks of Tainui (1989), drawing on various oral traditions.

== Background ==
The Tainui confederation originally settled on the western coast of the Waikato region at Kāwhia, around 1300. From that point onwards, they slowly expanded inland, with the Ngāti Raukawa iwi of Tainui establishing itself around the Waipā River. By the mid-seventeenth century, Ngāti Kahu-pungapunga were the only non-Tainui people remaining in the Waikato region. According to Jones, they were a tribe of Tangata whenua ('people of the land'), who had been presented in Waikato before the arrival of the Tainui. According to the 1886 testimony of Hōri Wirihana, they were part of the Te Arawa confederation. According to Waata Roore Erueti, their ancestor Kahupungapunga was the son of Manaia, brother-in-law of Ngātoro-i-rangi.

At this time, they inhabited the upper banks of the Waikato River, from Putāruru to Ātiamuri. This was fairly marginal land, but it included two maunga manu ('bird mountains'), Whakamaru and Tū-aropaki (now site of Mokai Power Station), which the people of Tainui desired.

== Outbreak of war ==
The rangatira (chieftain), Parahore or Purahore of Ngāti Kahu-pungapunga married Korokore (called Koroukore or Korokoro in some sources), the sister of Whāita, a prominent rangatira of the southern Tainui, who was based at Wharepuhunga, a hill not far from the west bank of the Waikato. However, a group of Ngāti Kahu-pungapunga led by Te Maru-huoko murdered her at Te Aharoa in Waotū because they knew that Tainui wanted their lands and they were angry that they were required to hand many of the birds that they caught over to her.

Gudgeon also reports an alternative version, in which Whāita had eloped with Waiarohi, wife of Te Ruamano, a rangatira of Ngāti Waihakari and left her with the Ngāti Kahu-pungapunga for safekeeping only for them to murder her for some reason.

News of the murder was brought to Tama-te-hura, a cousin of Korokore. He passed the news on to Whāita at Wharepuhunga, who gathered a war party. He was joined by Tama-te-hura's brothers Upoko-iti and Pipito, as well as Wairangi, who may have been a brother of Tama-te-hura or Whāita.

== Course of the war ==
Localised places in the war.
1 Wharepuhunga
2 Te Horanga
3 Maungatautari
4 Te Ana-kai-tangata
5 Pirau-nui
6 Puke-tōtara / Ōmaru-o-aka
7 Hōkio
8 Whakamaru
9 Waikuta
10 Pōhatu-roa

The Tainui war-party marched past Maungatautari and attacked the local forts of Ngāti Kahu-pungapunga on the west side of the Waikato River. According to Jones, the first place to fall was Te Pōhue, and the Ngāti Kahu-pungapunga then fled to Te Ana-kai-tangata ('Cannibal Cave') and Te Ana-kōpua ('Deep Pool Cave'). Defeated there, too, the Ngāti Kahu-pungapunga fled to another refuge, Takahanga-ahiahi.

Gudgeon says that the first conquest was Te Horanga, south of Kihikihi on the Puniu River, which was defended by Korokore's murderer, Te Maru-huoko, and that this was followed, on the same day, by the fall of the village of Te Aro-whenua, and two other places: Pōhue, and Taka-ahiahi. Bruce Biggs says the Te Horanga was the base of Parahore. Wirihana, on the other hand, says that Te Horanga was already in Tainui hands before the war, being the base of Tama-te-hura, and that the first battle of the war was Te Ana-kai-tangata.

=== Invasion of Waotū ===
After this, the Tainui war party split into two groups, which moved up the river on opposite sides. Wairangi and Upoko-iti stayed on the west side, while Whāita, Pipito, and Tama-te-hura crossed the Waikato River and advanced on the Waotū region, where Ngāti Kahu-pungapunga had three fortresses: Pirau-nui (a foothill of Matawhenua), Puke-tōtara / Ōmaru-o-aka, Pawa-iti, and Hōkio, which Whāita captured. At nearby Mangamingi, Pipito killed a Ngāti Kahu-pungapunga chieftain, Matanuku.

Gudgeon places the defence of Te Ana-kai-tangata at this point and says that the siege lasted for three days, before the Ngāti Kahu-pungapunga forces fled. Four of their chieftains, Kaimatirei, Te Aomakinga, Tokoroa, and Te Rau-o-te-Huia were killed.

From there, Ngāti Kahu-pungapunga fled south of Whakamaru, where they had two fortresses, Te-Ahi-pū and Te Aho-roa. Again, Whāita defeated them. At Te Aho-roa, all the Ngāti Kahu-pungapunga dead were burnt, as revenge for their murder of Korokore, which had taken place on the site. At nearby Turihemo, Whāita personally killed one Ngāti Kahu-pungapunga rangatira, Manuawhio, while Pipito captured a number of Ngāti Kahu-pungapunga hiding in a cave near Tokoroa and brought them back to Te Aho-roa to be eaten.

After this, Jones reports that Whāita's forces captured and killed one of the Ngāti Kahu-pungapunga chieftains, Tama-pohia, at Wai-mapora, and killed further Ngāti Kahu-pungapunga at Te Ripinga-a-tahurangi. Gudgeon instead says that Whāita's forces killed three chieftains: Pokere, Mangapohue, and Tikitikiroahanga.

=== Te Arawa intervention ===
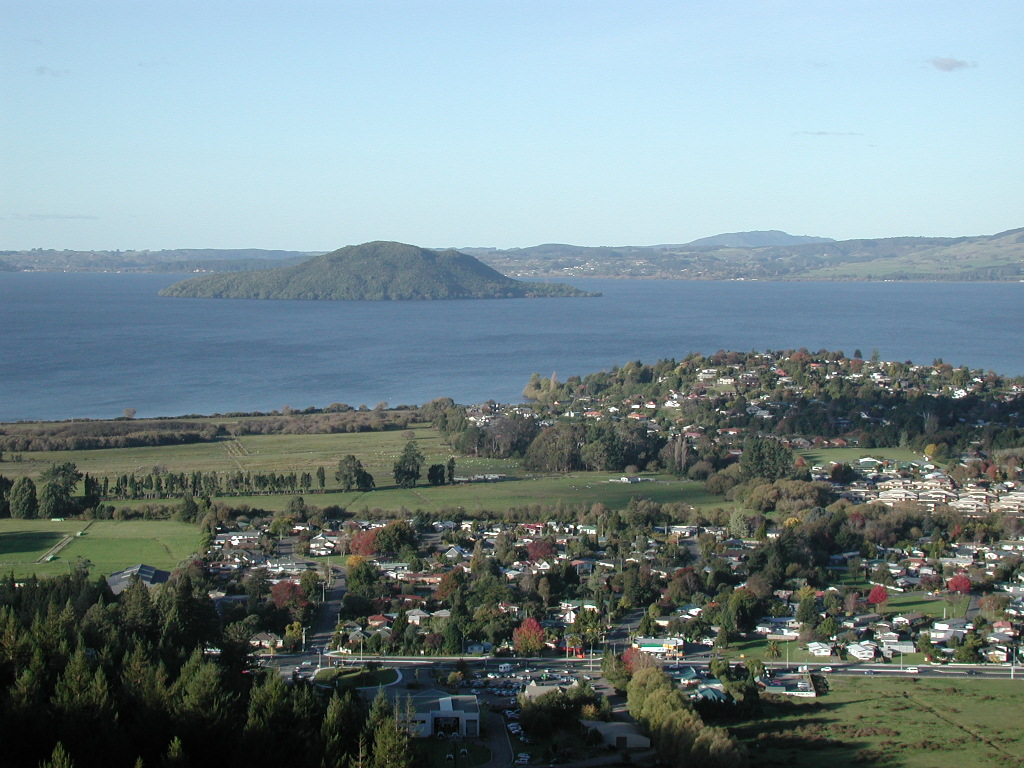
View of Lake Rotorua from the west.

The Te Arawa tribal confederation of the Bay of Plenty now intervened. The Tainui and Arawa versions agree that Te Arawa attacked Ngāti Raukawa on the Upper Waikato River and that Raukawa responded with a raid to Lake Rotorua. Otherwise, their accounts are very different.

==== Tainui accounts ====
Jones reports a Tainui version. He suggests that Te Arawa were worried about Whāita continuing into their lands or that they had marriage ties with the Ngāti Kahu-pungapunga. Whāita defeated the Te Arawa forces that had entered Ngāti Kahu-pungapunga lands and pursued them into Te Arawa land, where however, his forces were routed and forced to flee for the Waikato River, with Te Arawa in pursuit. At Te Whana-a-Whāita ('The springing back of Whāita'), Whāita rallied the troops and defeated Te Arawa. This place remained the boundary between Tainui and Te Arawa thereafter.

According to Gudgeon, Whāita's illness had prevented him from joining the expedition against Te Arawa, which he says was led by Tama-te-hura and reached Waikuta on the shores of Lake Rotorua before Te Arawa turned the force back, took Tama-te-hura prisoner, and killed Pipito. He says that the leader of the Arawa forces was Ariari-te-rangi, son of Hinemoa and Tūtānekai. In this account the Te Arawa pursued the Tainui forces all the way back to Te Whana-a-Whāita, where Whāita rallied them, as in Jones' version. While this was happening, Wairangi's force passed Te Wawa, killed the rangatira Whakahi at Te Pae-o-Turawau, and killed Korouamaku at Te Ngautuku, near Ātiamuri.

==== Te Arawa accounts ====
The Te Arawa version reported by Hamuera Pango of Ngāti Whakaue reports that one Taharangi of Te Arawa drowned at Atiamuri and when his body washed up at Matanuku, the Ngāti Raukawa there cooked and ate it. Te Rangikāheke of Ngāti Rangiwewehi says that the invaders killed Kaitui the rangatira of Ngāti Tuara and Ngāti Kea (relatives of Te Arawa). Ngāti Whakaue and Te Uri o Uenukukōpako therefore attacked Ngāti Raukawa at Whakamaru and killed Wairangi, hanging his body from a post. Ngāti Raukawa responded with an attack on Lake Rotorua, led by Tama-te-hura, Takehiku, Upokoiti, Poutu, and Haerehuka.

Ngāti Raukawa came to the pa Mokoroa, which blocked their way, when only the old and infirm were there. An old woman grabbed a taiaha and pushed huge rocks down on the attackers, causing them to withdraw. Ngāti Raukawa eventually conquered Mokoroa and killed everyone, but the delay provided time for someone to send a message to Ngongotaha, where a massive pahu (gong) was struck to some aid from Te Arawa on Mokoia. Te Arawa attacked Ngāti Raukawa at Kopakerauhue, but Ngāti Raukawa drove them back to Ngongotaha, where Pipito was killed by an Arawa chief named Whitiora and this caused the battle to turn in Te Arawa's favour. Tama-te-hura was taken prisoner and Raukawa fled. Marsh says that Upokoiti and Poutu were killed in the battle and that Tama-te-hura was killed in revenge for the eating of Taharangi. The battle was called Panepanehuka.

=== Siege of Pōhatu-roa ===
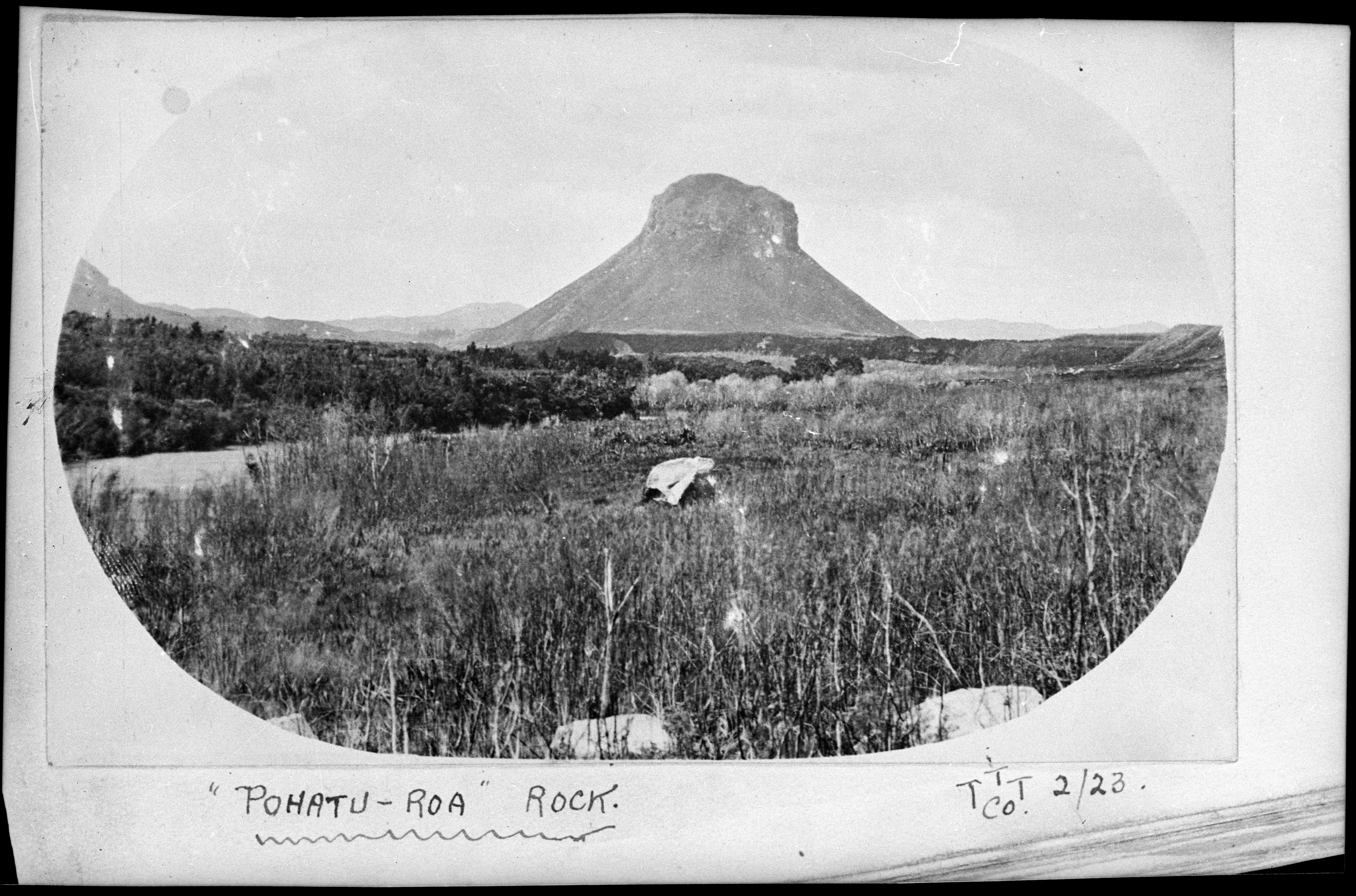
Pōhatu-roa, as photographed by Albert Percy Godber in February 1923.

The last of the Ngāti Kahu-pungapunga made their stand at Pōhatu-roa, a hill just west of Ātiamuri, which was the base of their allies, the Ngāti Hotu.

Whāita and Wairangi's war-parties reunited and surrounded the hill.The two forces clashed repeatedly, but eventually hunger sapped the defenders' strength and they were unable to deflect a Tainui assault, which captured the chieftain Hikaraupi and the mountain. According to Wirihana, at the end of the campaign there was a disagreement about what to do with the captured Ngāti Kahu-pungapunga – Tame-te-hura wanted to keep them as slaves, but Whāita insisted that they must all be killed, so that they would not return with Arawa support to reclaim the land. Jones agrees that all the Ngāti Kahu-pungapunga died, while Gudgeon speculates that they may have fled to join Te Arawa. Local tradition identifies a number of large stones as the location where the Ngāti Hotu and Ngāti Kahu-pungapunga prisoners were cooked and eaten.

== Aftermath ==
The war marked the final stage in the expansion of Tainui to encompass the whole of the Waikato region. The territory of Ngāti Kahu-pungapunga passed to the Ngāti Raukawa iwi of Tainui. The portion south of Whakamaru was settled by Wairangi and his descendants, the Ngāti Wairangi section of Ngāti Raukawa, who now share Mōkai marae with a number of other hapu. Whāita took the section furthest up the river, around Pōhatu-roa and his descendants, the Ngāti Whāita, have their marae at Ōngāroto, on the north bank of the Waikato River, a little west of Ātiamuri. The war also established the border between Tainui and Te Arawa at Te Whana-a-Whāita.

== Bibliography ==
- Gudgeon, W. E. (1893). "The Tangata Whenua; Or, Aboriginal People of The Central Districts of the North Island of New Zealand". Journal of the Polynesian Society. 2 (4): 203–210. Archived from the original on 30 January 2019.
- Jones, Pei Te Hurinui; Biggs, Bruce (2004). Ngā iwi o Tainui : nga koorero tuku iho a nga tuupuna = The traditional history of the Tainui people. Auckland [N.Z.]: Auckland University Press. ISBN 1869403312.
- Stafford, D.M. (1967). Te Arawa: A History of the Arawa People. Rotorua, New Zealand: A.H. & A.W. Reed.
