= Whāita =

Whāita was a Māori rangatira (chieftain) of the Ngāti Raukawa iwi in the Tainui tribal confederation based at Wharepuhanga near Rangitoto in the Waikato region, New Zealand and is the ancestor of the Ngāti Whāita hapū. He probably lived in the mid-seventeenth century.

== Life ==
Whāita was the son of Kurawari and Wharerere. Kurawari was a daughter of Raukawa and granddaughter of Tūrongo, the first chieftain of the southern Waikato region, and through him a direct descendant of Hoturoa, captain of the Tainui canoe. Wharerere was also a descendant of Hoturoa, through a collateral line.

Whāita had a sister, called Korokore, Koroukore, or Korokoro, who married Parahore or Purahore, rangatira of the Ngāti Kahu-pungapunga, who inhabited the upper banks of the Waikato River, from Putāruru to Ātiamuri.

=== Outbreak of war with Ngāti Kahu-pungapunga ===
Places in the war with Ngāti Kahu-pungapunga.
1 Wharepuhunga
2 Maungatautari
3 Pirau-nui
4 Puke-tōtara / Ōmaru-o-aka
5 Hōkio
6 Whakamaru
7 Waikuta
8 Pōhatu-roa and Ātiamuri

The people of Tainui desired the land of Ngāti Kahu-pungapunga, especially their two maunga manu ('bird mountains'), Whakamaru and Tū-aropaki (now site of Mokai Power Station). Because the people of Ngāti Kahu-pungapunga knew this, they resented their chieftain's wife, Korokore, especially when they were required to hand many of the birds that they caught over to her, so a group of them, led by Te Maru-huoko, gathered together and murdered Korokore at Waotū.

Walter Edward Gudgeon and D. M. Stafford report an alternative version, in which Whāita's lover Waiarohi, wife of Te Ruamano, a rangatira of Ngāti Huarere, was left her in the care of Ngāti Kahu-pungapunga for safekeeping only for them to murder her.

One of Korokore's slaves escaped and brought news of this murder to Tame-te-hura, a cousin of Korokore. He passed the news on to Whāita at Wharepuhanga, who gathered a war party. He was joined by Tama-te-hura's brothers Upoko-iti and Pipito, as well as Wairangi, who may have been a brother of Tama-te-hura or Whāita.

=== Invasion of Waotū ===
The Tainui war-party marched past Maungatautari and attacked the local forts of Ngāti Kahu-pungapunga on the west side of the Waikato River. Then the war party split into two groups, which moved up the river on opposite sides. Wairangi and Upoko-iti stayed on the west side, while Whāita, Pipito, and Tama-te-hura crossed the Waikato River and advanced on the Waotū region, where Ngāti Kahu-pungapunga had three fortresses: Pirau-nui (a foothill of Matawhenua), Puke-tōtara / Ōmaru-o-aka, Pawa-iti, and Hōkio, which Whāita captured.

From there, Ngāti Kahu-pungapunga fled south of Whakamaru, where they had two fortresses, Te-Ahi-pū and Te Aho-roa. Again, Whāita defeated them. At Te Aho-roa, all the Ngāti Kahu-pungapunga dead were burnt, as revenge for their murder of Korokore, which had taken place on the site. At nearby Turihemo, Whāita personally killed one Ngāti Kahu-pungapunga rangatira, Manuawhio, while Pipito captured a number of Ngāti Kahu-pungapunga hiding in a cave near Tokoroa and brought them back to Te Aho-roa to be eaten.

=== Te Arawa and Te Whana-a-Whāita ===
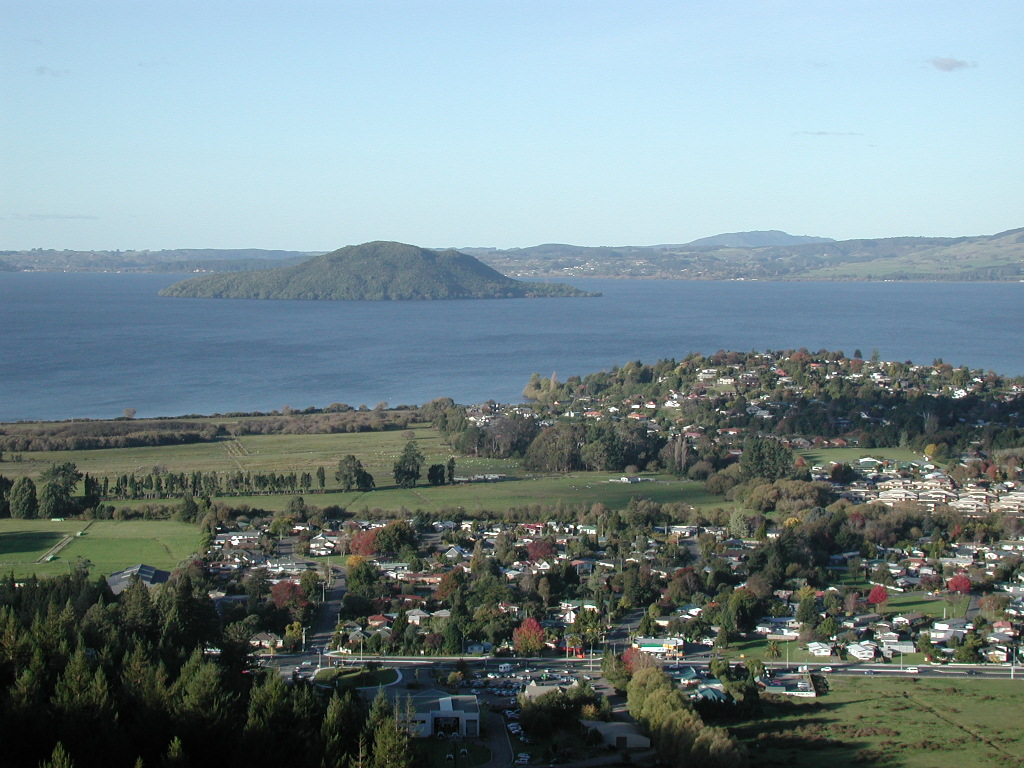
View of Lake Rotorua from the west.

The Te Arawa tribal confederation of the Bay of Plenty now intervened. Jones suggests that they were worried about Whāita continuing into their lands or that they had marriage ties with the Ngāti Kahu-pungapunga. Whāita defeated the Te Arawa forces that had entered Ngāti Kahu-pungapunga lands and pursued them into Te Arawa land, where however, his forces were routed and forced to flee for the Waikato River, with Te Arawa in pursuit. At Te Whana-a-Whāita ('The springing back of Whāita'), Whāita rallied the troops and defeated Te Arawa. This place remained the boundary between Tainui and Te Arawa thereafter.

According to Gudgeon, Whāita's illness had prevented him from joining the expedition against Te Arawa, which he says was led by Tama-te-hura and reached Waikuta on the shores of Lake Rotorua before Te Arawa turned the force back, took Tama-te-hura prisoner, and killed Pipito. He says that the leader of the Arawan forces was Ariari-te-rangi, son of Hinemoa and Tūtānekai. In this account Te Arawa pursued the Tainui forces all the way back to Te Whana-a-Whāita, where Whāita rallied them, as in Jones' version.

=== Pohatu-roa ===
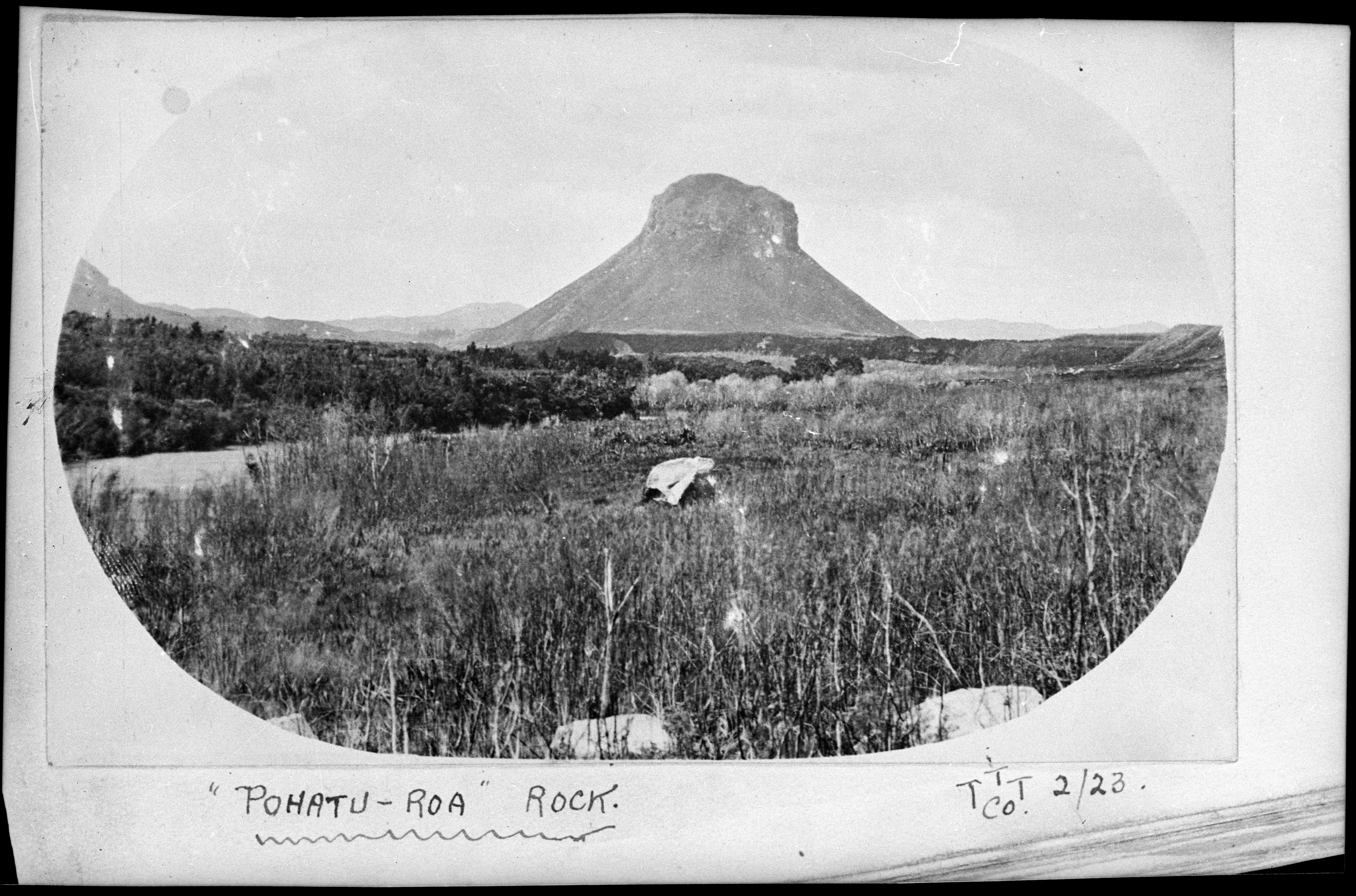
Pōhatu-roa, as photographed by Albert Percy Godber in February 1923.

The last of the Ngāti Kahu-pungapunga made their stand at Pōhatu-roa, a hill just west of modern Ātiamuri. Whāita and Wairangi's war-parties reunited and surrounded the hill. Eventually hunger sapped the defenders' strength and they were unable to deflect a Tainui assault, which captured the mountain. At this point there was a disagreement about what to do with the captured Ngāti Kahu-pungapunga – Tame-te-hura wanted to keep them as slaves, but Whāita insisted that they must all be killed, so that they would not return with Te Arawa support to reclaim the land. Jones agrees that all the Ngāti Kahu-pungapunga died, while Gudgeon speculates that they may have fled to join Te Arawa.

== Family ==
Whāita had one son, Huiao, who married two daughters of Uenuku-tuhatu, son of Whatihua. With the first daughter, Māpau-inuhia, he had a son, Tū-irirangi (ancestor of the Ngāti Kinohaku hapū of Ngāti Maniapoto) and a daughter, Hine-moana, who married Tūpito. With the second daughter, Waengarangi, he had Pai-ariki.

Whāita's descendants, the Ngāti Whāita, have their marae at Ōngāroto, on the north bank of the Waikato River, a little west of Ātiamuri. Stafford reports that Whāita fought a decisive battle against Ngāti Kahupungapunga there and erected a set of 170 standing stones at a place nearby called Te Pae o Tawhiti, one for each enemy killed.

== Sources ==
A detailed account of Whāita's exploits during the war was published by Walter Edward Gudgeon in the 1893 issue of the Journal of the Polynesian Society, with no indication of the sources on which it is based. A similar account is given by Pei Te Hurinui Jones, based on oral testimony given at the Māori Land Court at Cambridge in a dispute over ownership of the Waotū area. A similar account was given by Hōri Wirihana of Ngāti Kauwhata in evidence to the Māori Land Court at Ōtorohanga on 17 August 1886.

== Bibliography ==
- Gudgeon, W. E. (1893). "The Tangata Whenua; Or, Aboriginal People of The Central Districts of the North Island of New Zealand". Journal of the Polynesian Society. 2 (4): 203–210.
- Jones, Pei Te Hurinui; Biggs, Bruce (2004). Ngā iwi o Tainui : nga koorero tuku iho a nga tuupuna = The traditional history of the Tainui people. Auckland [N.Z.]: Auckland University Press. ISBN 1869403312.
- Stafford, D.M. (1967). Te Arawa: A History of the Arawa People. Rotorua, New Zealand: A.H. & A.W. Reed.
