= Uenukukōpako =

Māori rangatira

Uenukukōpako was a Māori rangatira (chief) in the Te Arawa confederation of tribes and ancestor of the iwi of Te Uri o Uenukukōpako. He joined his cousin Rangiteaorere in the conquest of Mokoia Island in Lake Rotorua and settled his people there.

== Life ==
Uenukukōpako was born at Ohoukaka on Lake Rotoiti. His father was Tūhourangi, ancestor of the Tūhourangi iwi, through whom he was descended from Tama-te-kapua, the captain of the Arawa by multiple lines. His mother was Rakeitahaenui. He had one full brother, Taketakehikuroa, and a half-brother, Maruhangaroa.

=== Conquest of Mokoia ===
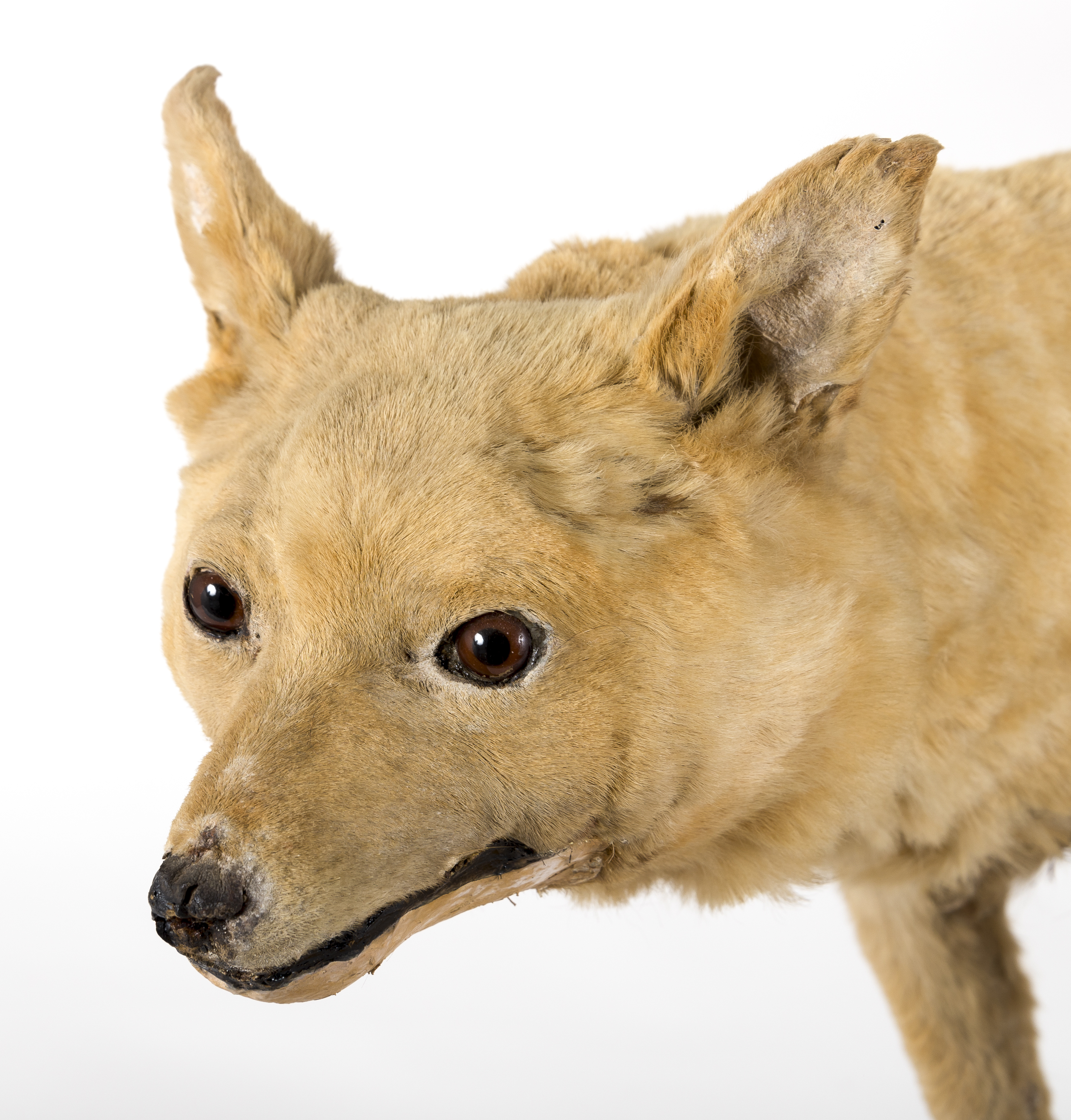
Kurī (Māori dog).

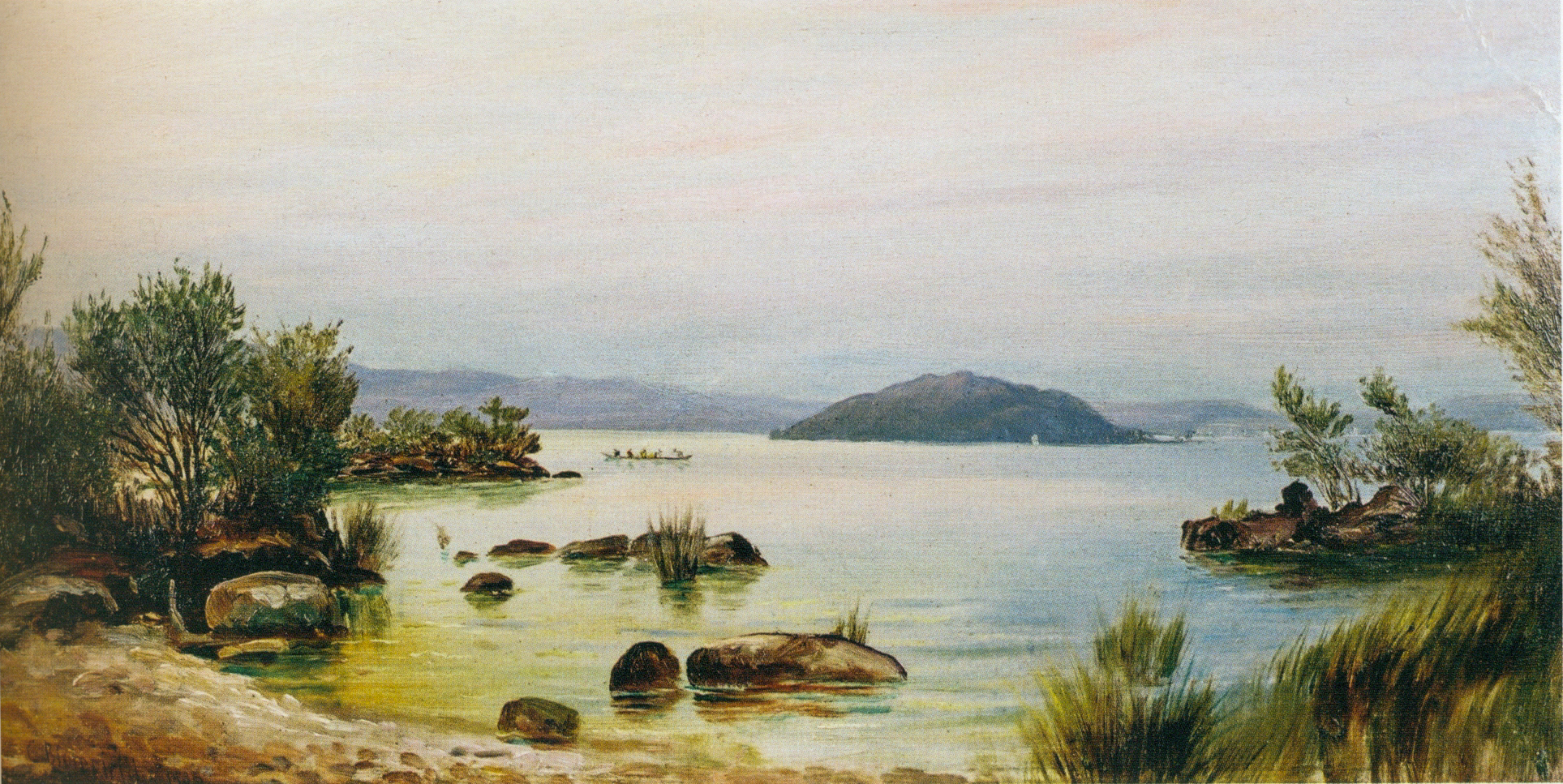
Mokoia Island, painting by Charles Blomfield, 1908.

When Uenukukōpako and Taketakehikuroa were grown up and married, they decided to visit their wives' families at Maroanuiatia. They took a canoe through the Ohau channel to Ohinemutu and as they went past Mokoia Island, Uenukukōpako's dog, Potakatawhiti jumped out and swam to the island. Since the dog would not get back in the boat, Uenukukōpako asked the residents of Mokoia Island, who were led by Kawaarero, to look after the dog. But when he returned from his trip, he found out that Kawaarero had killed the dog. Uenukukōpako and Taketakehikuroa led a war party in an attack on Mokoia in revenge, but the defenders stood in the water and overturned the attacker's canoes as they came into shore, forcing them to retreat. They attacked a second time with the aide of their paternal uncle, Rangiwhakaekeau, but were defeated again.

At this point, Rangiteaorere, an illegitimate son of Rangiwhakaekeau, arrived from Te Teko and agreed to participate in a third attack on Mokoia, so long as he was given leadership of the expedition. Rangiteaorere swam out in the night and planted a stump in the lakebed near the shore of Mokoia and attached a rope to it. When the attackers approached the island in their canoes the next morning, Kawaarero waded out into the water to overturn the canoes, but Rangiteaorere grabbed onto the rope and used it to pull his canoe past the defenders and straight to the shore. They then attacked the defenders from behind and killed them. Kawaarero fled to the highpoint of the island or to a rock off the shore, but Rangiteaorere killed him. Uenukukōpako killed another chief, Arorangi. The attackers also killed the chiefs Mamaku, Matariki, Ouepo, Te Arai, Maungaroa, and Parakiri and most of the other inhabitants of the island. The bay where the battle had taken place was named Te Koupaengatangata ("the stump overthrows the people"). The survivors fled to the mainland, where Uenukukōpako attacked them at Mataiahurangi (near Te Ahuaha-pakahu stream), at Te Pihapiha pā, and Wharangi pā. The survivors fled via Okareka and Tikitapu to the Waikato.

After the battle, Uenukukōpako and his brother Taketakehikuroa both settled on Mokoia. Taketakehikuroa declared a particular hot spring to be tapu, but Uenukukōpako ordered his wife Taoitekura to wash their newborn daughter in the spring anyway. Taketakehikuroa appealed to Rangiteaorere, who decided that Uenukukōpako had done no wrong, and Taketakehikuroa left the island and resettled at Ohoukaka. The daughter was named Waitapu (tapu water) in commemoration of the event.

=== Travels and settlement ===
Uenukukōpako travelled widely. During these travels, he established a pā (fortified village) at Waiteti, another at Weriweri, which he gave to his son Whakaue-kaipapa, and a third one at Ātiamuri, which he called Te Ngārahu. He also visited Horohoro and Maronuiatia. During his lifetime, all the huahua (cooked birds, preserved in their own fat) from Maroanui, Patetere, Whakamaru, and Horohoro were sent to Uenukukōpako.

== Family ==
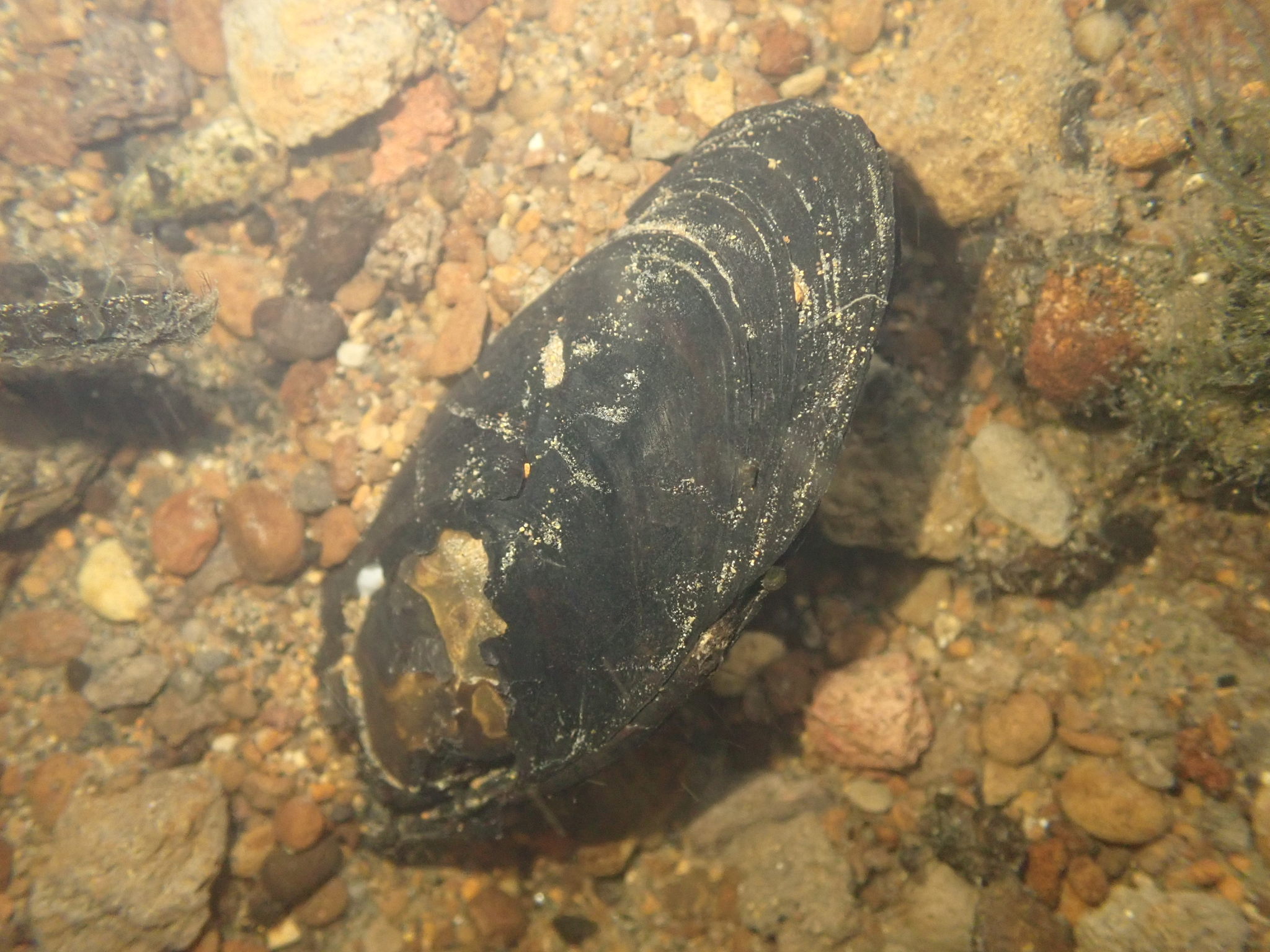
Kākahi (freshwater mussels)

Uenukukōpako married Rangiwhakapiri and Hinepito before the conquest of Mokoia and Taoitekura later on. They often argued over which of them had precedence, so he took them to a sand bar in Lake Rotorua where there was lots of kākahi (freshwater mussels) and told them that whichever one managed to dive down and bring up sand from the bottom of the lake would have precedence. Rangiwhakapiri and Hinepito dived down first, but came up emptyhanded, while Taoitekura dived down for a long time and eventually emerged with the sand, so she became the favourite wife.

Uenukukōpako and Rangiwhakapiri had two sons and a daughter:

- Tamatera
- Whakaue-kaipapa, ancestor of Ngāti Whakaue, who married Rangiuru and had six children:

- Tawakeheimoa
- Tuteaiti

- Parehina, who married Whatumairangi, son of Tutanekai and Hinemoa:

- Taiwere, who married Tāmiuru:

- Pūkaki.

- Ngararanui
- Tupaharanui
- He was also the adoptive father of Tūtānekai, who married Hinemoa.

- Te Aorauru, who married her cousin Tuteamutu and had a son:

- Umukaria:

- Hinemoa, who married Tūtānekai.
- Te Koropunia
- Wahiao

Uenukukōpako and Hinepito had three sons:

- Tumahaurangi, who married two daughters of Rangiteaorere, but was murdered by him for a perceived insult.
- Taharangi, who drowned at Atiamuri and was eaten by Ngāti Raukawa, spurring the intervention of Te Arawa in the Ngāti Raukawa–Ngāti Kahu-pungapunga War.
- Kopuatawhiti, who married Kaitu and had a daughter:

- Waiarohi, who married Ruamano, son of Reretoi of Ngāti Tamaihutoroa, and whose descendants were allowed to remain at Papohatu pā in the Rotorua region after the Ngati Tamaihutoroa-Ngāti Tangaroamihi War, when the rest of Ngāti Tamaihutoroa were expelled from the region.

Uenukukōpako and Taoitekura had one daughter and five sons:

- Waitapu (female)
- Tuwahiao
- Hauora, ancestor of the Ngāti Hauora hapū, who was murdered by Rangiteaorere along with Tumahaurangi.
- Hinemaru
- Kiritai
- Kaiwhenua

== Bibliography ==
- Stafford, D.M. (1967). Te Arawa: A History of the Arawa People. Rotorua, New Zealand: A.H. & A.W. Reed.
- Mitchell, J. H. (2014). Takitimu: A History of Ngati Kahungunu. Libro International. ISBN 978-1-877514-72-2. Archived from the original on 2024-02-04.
