= Waiarohi =

New Zealand Māori chief

Waiarohi was a Māori leader from the Ngāti Rangitihi iwi (tribe) of the Te Arawa confederation of tribes, who lived in the Bay of Plenty Region of New Zealand, around the mid-seventeenth century. She married Ruamano of Ngāti Huarere but fell in love with Whaita of Ngāti Raukawa and went insane when the latter left her. In one account, her murder led to the Ngāti Raukawa–Ngāti Kahu-pungapunga War and the expansion of Tainui into the upper Waikato River valley.

== Life ==
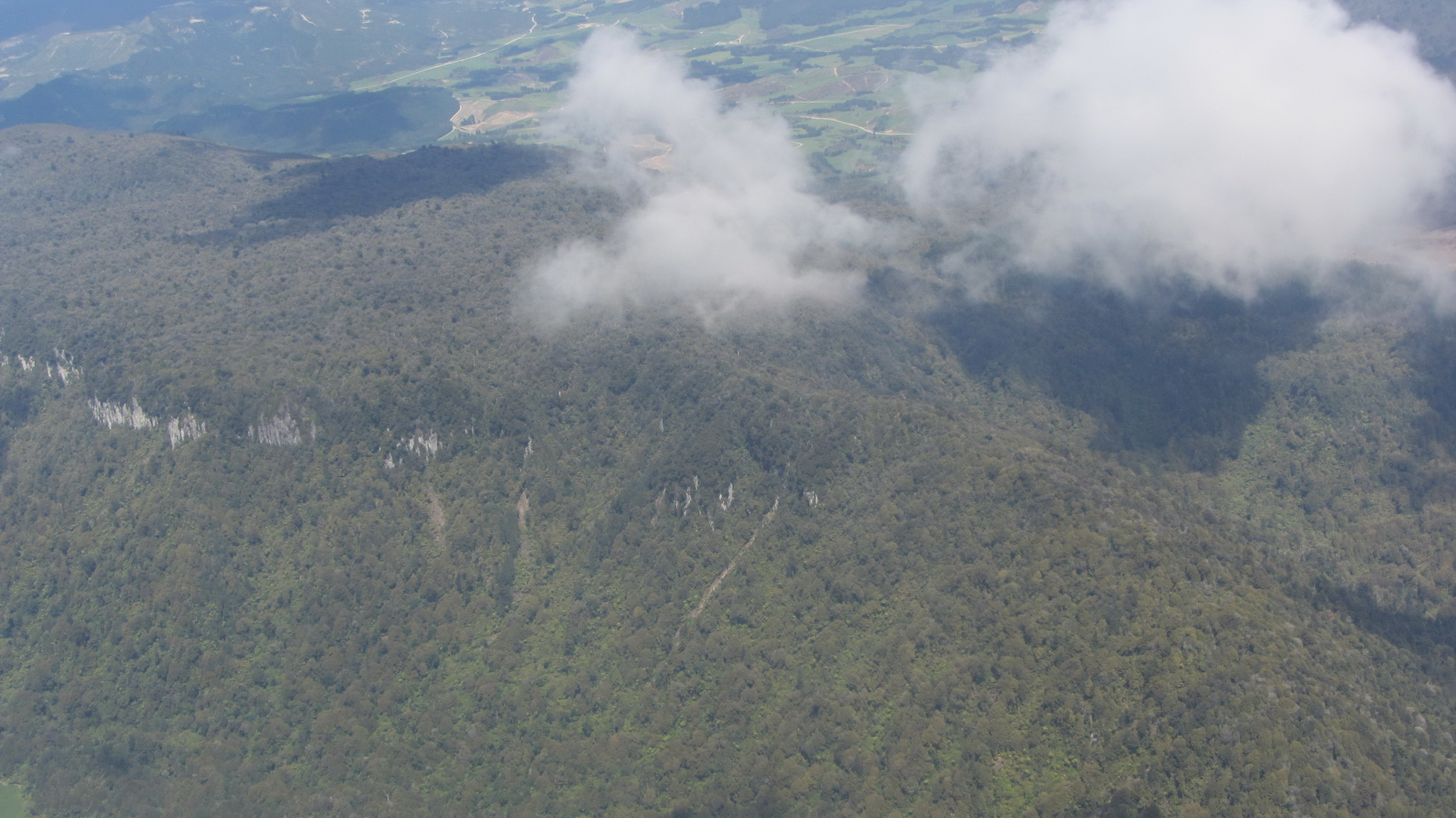
Horohoro Cliffs, near Mount Haparangi

Waiarohi was the daughter of Kopuatawhiti, the son of Uenukukōpako, and Kaitu. Through her father, she was a direct descendant of Tama-te-kapua, the captain of the Arawa by multiple lines. When she grew up, Waiarohi married Ruamano of Horohoro, a distant cousin from Ngāti Huarere and Ngāti Tamaihutoroa (a descendant of Īhenga). The couple spent their time at their pā sites at Papohatu and Parikarangi.

One day, the village of Parikarangi was visited by a group of travellers from Ngāti Raukawa. Waiarohi had an affair with one of the travellers, Whaita. Although the villagers were infuriated when this was discovered, Ruamano allowed Whaita to depart unharmed. He even warned Whaita of an ambush planned by other men of the village at Hinemoa rock south of Horohoro.

Waiarohi was driven mad by longing for Whaita and took to screaming and wandering about. The village was named Parikarangi ('cliff of restlessness') because of her wanderings. Mount Haparangi ('the crying out') received its name because she used to climb up the mountain and cry out for Whaita. Te Hereherenga ('the binding') was named because the people had to tie her up here to keep her from committing self-harm.

Eventually, Waiarohi's condition became so difficult that Ruamano sent her to stay with his vassals among Ngāti Kahupungapunga. They built a nice house for her, but eventually they decided that she was too difficult, so they set fire to the house and burnt her alive. Whaita came to investigate the scene of the fire, discovered Waiarohi's jawbone among the ashes and decided to lead an attack on Ngāti Kahupungapunga in revenge, leading, in one version, to the Ngāti Raukawa–Ngāti Kahu-pungapunga War, in which Ngāti Kahupungapunga were destroyed.

At a later date, Ngāti Tangaroamihi and Ngāti Rangitihi went to war with Ruamano's cousins Ngāti Tamaihutoroa and drove most of them out of the Rotorua region, but they allowed Waiarohi and Ruamano's descendants to remain at Papohatu pā because, through Waiarohi, they were also part of Ngāti Rangitihi.

== Bibliography ==
- Stafford, D.M. (1967). Te Arawa: A History of the Arawa People. Rotorua, New Zealand: A.H. & A.W. Reed.
