= Tainui Group Holdings =

Tainui Group Holdings Limited
- Trade name: Tainui Group
- Formerly: Iraklis Thirty One Limited (24 March 1998 – 10 June 1998)
- Type: Private
- Industry: Holding
- Founded: 24 March 1998
- Headquarters: 6 Bryce Street, Hamilton, New Zealand
- Key people: Chris Joblin - CEO
- Operating income: ▲NZ$84.01 million (2015)
- Total assets: ▲NZ$1,163 million (2015)
- Total equity: ▲NZ$861.56 million (2015)
- Owner: The Waikato Raupatu Trust
- Members: 67,000 (2015)
- Parent: Te Whakakitenga o Waikato Incorporated
- Website: tgh.co.nz

Tainui Group Holdings Limited is a New Zealand-based company owned by the Waikato Tainui iwi of the North Island of New Zealand. With main interests in tourism, fisheries, property and forestry it is among the wealthiest iwi in New Zealand, and annually contributes around $20 million to the Waikato Regional economy.

== History ==
The central North Island-based Tainui iwi has a corporate history dating back to 1995, when it settled for a $170 million package of cash and crown-owned land. Tainui subsequently received top-ups to the value of 17 percent of the original settlement.

== Investments ==
=== Property Investments ===
==== Te Arikinui Hotel ====
On 3 December 2016, it was reported that Waikato-Tainui and Tainui Group Holdings Limited had come to an agreement with Auckland Airport to develop their second hotel near Auckland Airport. The new 5-star hotel will be named Te Arikinui after the mother of King Tuheitia.

The hotel, like the Novotel Tainui, will also be under Accor management, and will be under the Pullman Hotels-brand. As a part of the deal with Accor and the Airport, the Airport has increased its stake in the Novotel Tainui to 50%, with Tainui Group Holdings retains 50%.

==== The Base Shopping Centre ====
The Base is a shopping centre located in Hamilton, New Zealand. The 30-hectare (74-acre) site was “confiscated” and it was given back before World War II to build the Te Rapa Air Force Base and was returned to the tribe in 1995. The Base was originally a joint venture with Warehouse Group between 2002 and 2007, before Tainui Group Holdings acquired The Warehouse Group's stake for $37.4 million. In 2009, Tainui Group Holdings is said to have invested $100 million developing The Base and had committed a further $100 million to further developing the shopping centre.

In August 2015, Tainui Group Holdings announced intentions to sell up to 50% of The Base shopping centre and use the funds to repay debt and for other investments.

Tainui Group Holdings acting chief executive Chris Joblin said, "Following a three-month review, we believe that now is the right time to seek an experienced joint venture partner and operator to help us take The Base to the next level of excellence."

In April 2016, New Zealand-listed property investor, Kiwi Property Group agreed to buy 50% of The Base shopping centre from Tainui Group Holdings for $192.5 million and offered $197.5 million for the balance. On 16 May 2016 it was confirmed that Kiwi Property will acquire 50% of The Base after Waikato-Tainui turned down the property investor's proposal to buy all of the shopping centre.

==== Hotel Novotel Auckland Airport ====
On 23 July 2009, a joint venture was signed today between Accor Hospitality, Tainui Group Holdings and Auckland International Airport to develop, operate, and manage a 260-room Novotel-branded hotel located at Auckland Airport. The cost was estimated to be roughly $65m including hotel construction, which is estimated to be about $45m. The hotel is expected, and was, to be completed in time for the 2011 Rugby World Cup. Novotel Auckland Airport was designed by Warren & Mahoney Architects, with the final design to infuse subtle references to New Zealand culture and heritage.

Tainui Group Holdings CEO Said, "The Airport hotel will also generate considerable long-term economic growth and provide many new jobs for the Auckland region. The hotel will assist Auckland and New Zealand tourism and trade. It will cater for the inevitable economic recovery and growth when it returns."

=== Ngāi Tahu Joint Ventures ===
==== Initial Ventures ====
On 26 November 2007, the Herald announced that Ngāi Tahu and Tainui had met at Arowhenua Marae in South Canterbury and signed deals to establish formal intentions on 23 November 2007 to work together, using a memorandum of understanding to form a basis to establish a working environment between the two iwi.

New Zealand Labour Party MP Shane Jones said, "You need to remember that Māori trusts and iwi organisations, they're very rarely sellers. They like to hold assets for a long, long time, and given the amount of foreign ownership in the economy, it's good that tribes work together and help to buy back some of those assets that looked lost."

As the first joint-activity of the two tribes, in February 2009, Ngāi Tahu acquired 6% of Ryman Healthcare and subsequently on-sold 4.5% to Tainui; raisings its shareholding in Ryman to 8%, and establishing Tainui as a shareholder.

==== Waikato Milking Systems ====
In June 2014, Tainui and Ngāi Tahu as well as Pioneer Capital acquired Waikato Milking Systems NZ Limited under a limited partnership, Waikato Milking Systems LP. The partners have stated that they intend to grow the company, either naturally, or by mergers and acquisitions. The company is New Zealand's biggest manufacturer and designer of milking systems, and runs all aspects of its systems, from the stainless steel to the software that helps run the cowsheds. The company, at the time of purchase, had an annual turnover quickly approaching $100 million. All three companies have an equal 33.30% share is the limited partnership.

==== GoBus ====
In August 2014, Ngāi Tahu and Tainui purchased GoBus from Australian private equity-firm Next Capital. The total purchase price was $170 million. The purchase is expected to gain approval from New Zealand's Overseas Investment Office due to the company selling GoBus being Australian-owned.

=== Other Investments ===
==== Auckland Warriors ====
In October 1998, Tainui invested in the Auckland Warriors for $3.5 million along with a consortium that included Graham Lowe and Malcolm Boyle, under the company Rugby League People Ltd. Waikato-Tainui subsidiary MDC Investment Holdings Ltd owned 66.6% of the RLP in 2000.

After several months of poor performance, the Warriors were offloaded in September 2000 to New Zealand Rugby League for a price reported to be around NZ$400,000. It was reported that by the time MDC had sold their stake in the Warriors, they had already lost NZ$6.3 million.
