= Rangiteaorere =

New Zealand Māori rangatira (chief)

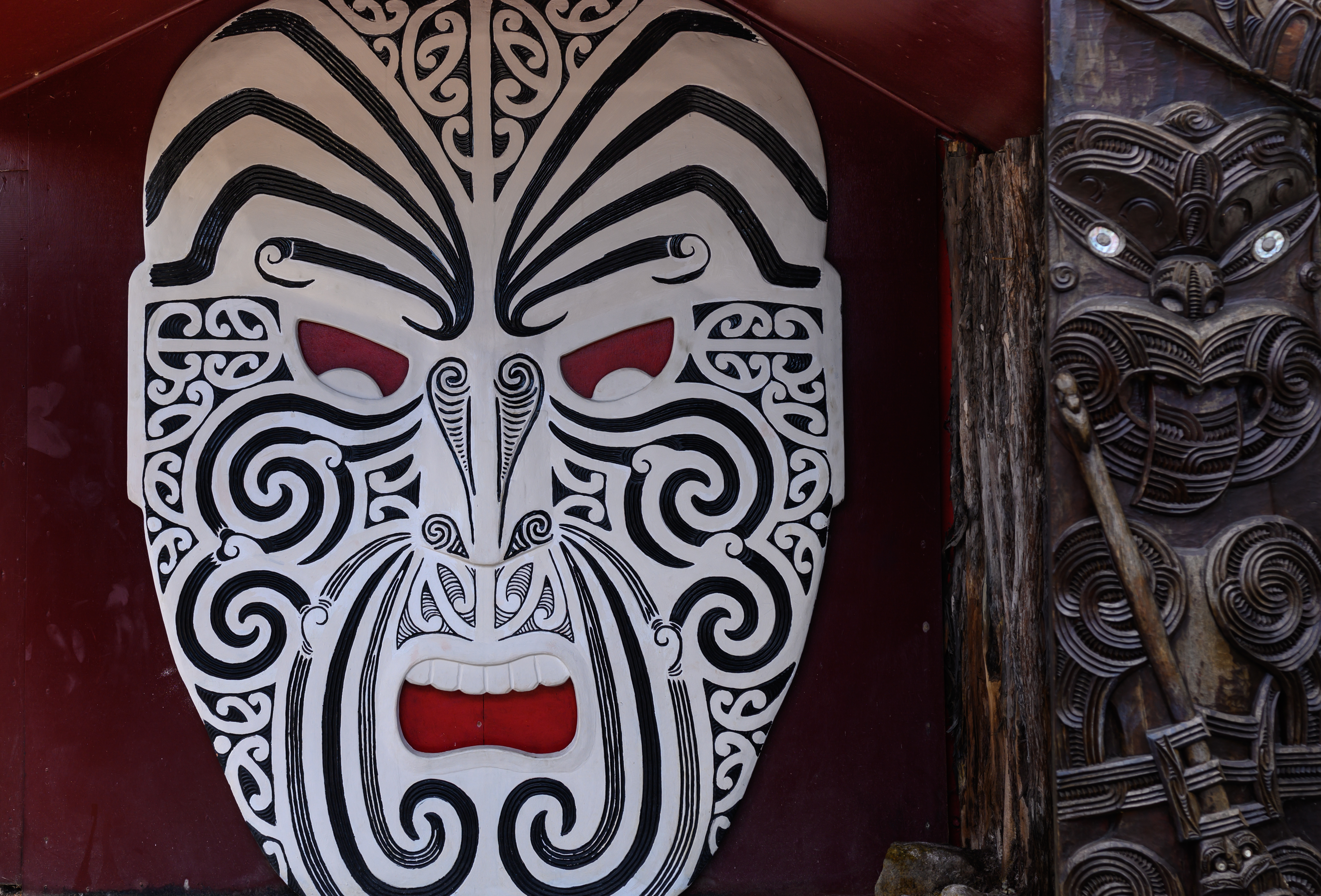
Modern depiction of Rangiteaorere at Tikitere.

Rangiteaorere was a Māori rangatira (chief) in the Te Arawa confederation of tribes and ancestor of Ngāti Rangiteaorere. He grew up at Te Teko in the Bay of Plenty and travelled to Lake Rotorua to find his father in adulthood. There he led his father's people in a successful invasion of Mokoia Island, alongside his cousin Uenukukōpako. Later, he visited Hapainga in Tauranga with his father and was nearly burnt alive, but escaped and took revenge by killing all the local people. In later life, he killed two sons of Uenukukōpako, leading to a conflict with their brothers which nearly lead to his death.

== Life ==
Rangiteaorere was born at Te Teko on the Rangitaiki River in the Bay of Plenty. His father was Rangiwhakaekeau of Ngāti Rangitihi, a direct descendant of Tama-te-kapua, the captain of the Arawa. His mother was Uenukurauiri, a sister of Tūhoe Pōtiki, whom Rangiwhakaekeau seduced while her husband was away. When Rangiwhakaekeau realised that Uenukurauiri was pregnant, he told her ka whanau to tamaiti he wahine, tapaia ki te au o Rangitaiki. E whanau he tane, tapaia ko te ao e rere nei ("if the child is born female, name her after the current of the Rangitaiki river. If it is male, call him after the drifting clouds"). When Uenukurauiri went into labour, she was not able to give birth, until the tohunga included the whakapapa of Rangiwhakaekeau in their incantations, thereby revealing that the child was illegitimate. Since the child was born male, she named him Rangiteaorere ("Sky of the drifting clouds").

=== Journey to Rangiwhakakapua ===
Rangiteaorere grew up to be a famous warrior and, as an adult, Uenukurauiri told him that he could find his father at Rangiwhakakapua on the shore of Lake Rotorua and he led a party of 140 men to find him. This group travelled along the south coast of Lake Rotoiti, rested at Tikitere, and arrived at Rangiwhakakapua. On the way, they encountered a taniwha called Kataore, which ate travellers, but they threw him a calabash of food and passed by safely. Rangiteaorere climbed over the village palisade, went to Rangiwhakaekeau's house and sat on his father's pillow. Rangiwhakaekeau came running up to avenge this insult, but Rangiteaorere revealed his identity by singing a song about his mother, thereby revealing his identity. Rangiwhakaekeau took Rangiteaorere to Te Waitohinga-a-Rangiteaorere in Okawa Bay, Rotoiti and performed the tohi ritual there to cleanse him of the tapu incurred by sitting on the pillow.

=== Conquest of Mokoia ===
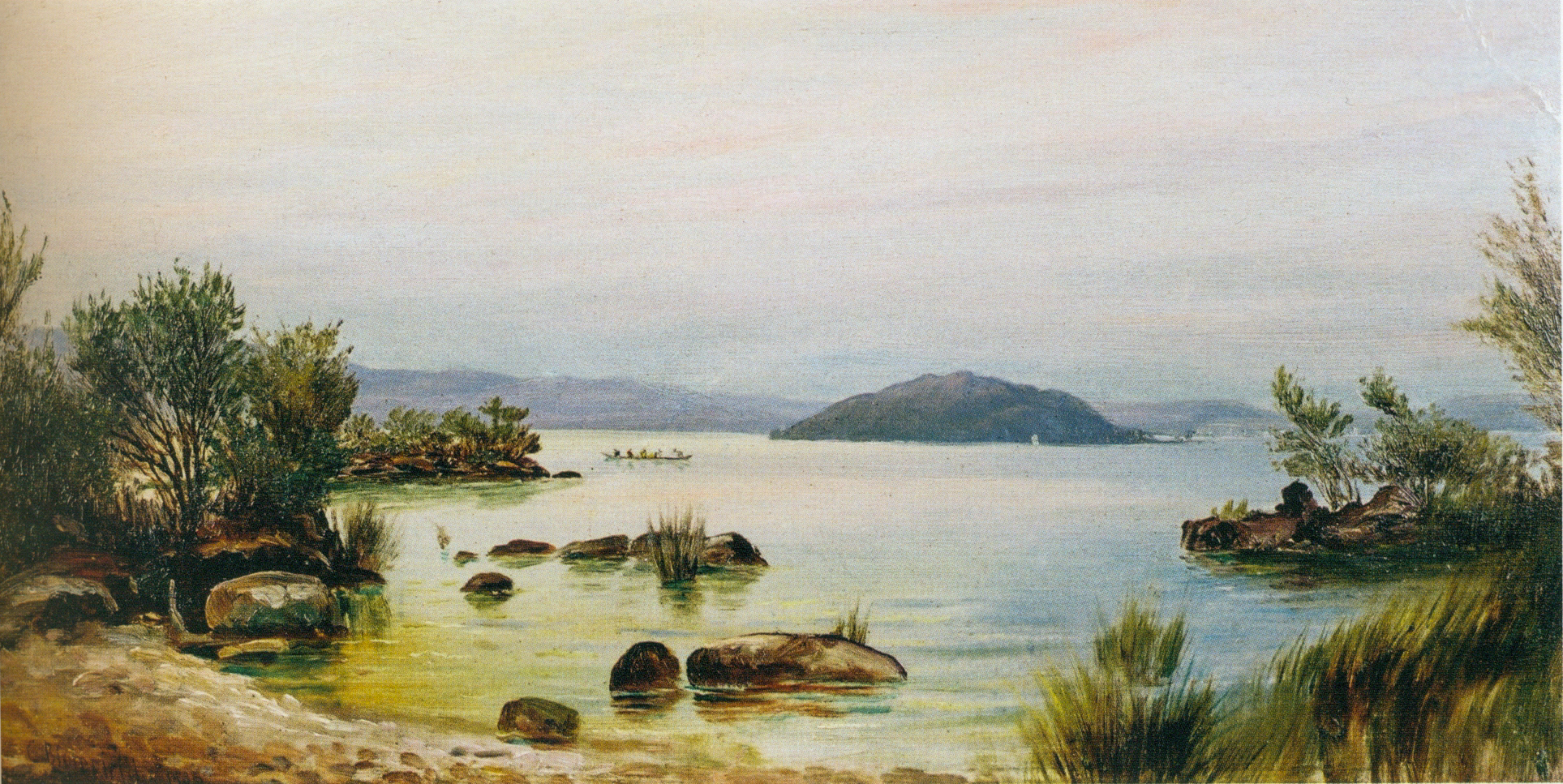
Mokoia Island, painting by Charles Blomfield, 1908.

Shortly before this, Ngāti Rangitihi had come into conflict with the residents of Mokoia Island in Lake Rotorua, who were led by Kawaarero. This conflict had begun when Kawaarero's people killed the dog of Uenukukōpako, a nephew of Rangiwhakaekeau. Uenukukōpako led a war party in an attack on Mokoia in revenge, but was rebuffed. He attacked a second time with Rangiwhakaekeau's aide, but was defeated again.

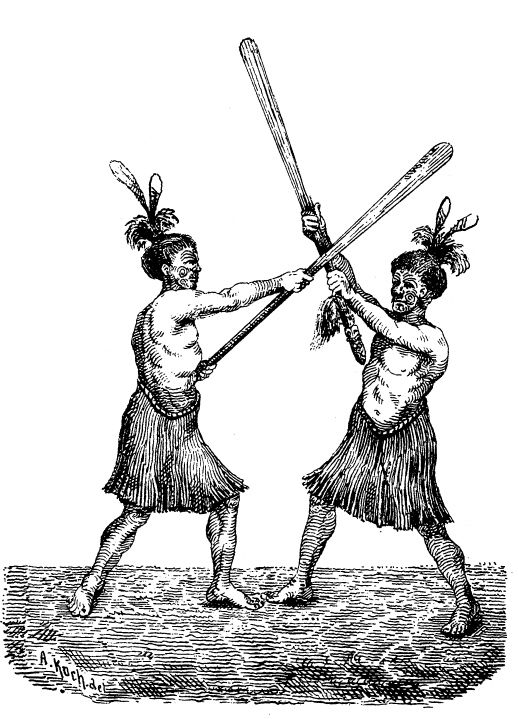
Two Māori men wielding taiaha.

Rangiteaorere agreed to aid in a third attack on Mokoia. As they were preparing, he boasted about his skill with the taiaha and was challenged to a duel by a man from Tauranga called Rakopa. Rangiteaorere killed him and the war party ate him. Rangiteaorere declared that he could capture Mokoia, if he was given command of the expedition, and the people agreed to this. Rangiteaorere swam out in the night and planted a stump in the lakebed near the shore of Mokoia and attached a rope to it. When his force approached the island in their canoes the next morning, Kawaarero waded out into the water to overturn the canoes, but Rangiteaorere grabbed onto the rope and used it to pull the canoe past the defenders and straight to the shore. They then attacked the defenders from behind and killed them.

Kawaarero fled to the highpoint of the island or to a rock off the shore, but Rangiteaorere killed him. Uenukukōpako killed another chief, Arorangi. The attackers also killed the chiefs Mamaku, Matariki, Ouepo, Te Arai, Maungaroa, and Parakiri and most of the other inhabitants of the island. The bay where the battle had taken place was named Te Koupaengatangata ("the stump overthrows the people"). When the bodies of the dead and been piled up, Rangiteaorere climbed on top of them and suang the karakia Te huinga o te patu a Tu ("the gathering of those slain by Tū"). The survivors fled to the mainland, where they were attacked repeatedly by Uenukukōpako and eventually fled to the Waikato.

Rangiteaorere went away to Te Teko. When he returned to Mokoia, Uenukukōpako and his brother Taketakehikuroa had both settled on Mokoia. The latter had declared a particular hot spring to be tapu, but Uenukukōpako had ordered his wife to wash their newborn baby in the spring anyway. Taketakehikuroa appealed to Rangiteaorere, who decided that Uenukukōpako had done no wrong, so Taketakehikuroa left the island in shame.

Rangiteaorere now settled on Mokoia at Rangiahua pā.

=== Visit to Hapainga ===
Rangiteaorere and his father led a party to Hapainga in Tauranga for the funeral of Rakopa, the man whom Rangiteaorere had killed before the invasion of Mokoia. On arrival, they were led into a big house, which the visitors locked and set on fire. Rangiteaorere escaped unseen through a window and fled. The following night he returned to the village and killed a woman at Paepaehumuti and performed incantations over her dead body, which empowered him to get revenge for the attack. He snuck back into the village the next night, found his father's head and then set fire to the house where the villagers were sleeping, killing them all.

=== Conflict with the children of Uenukukōpako ===
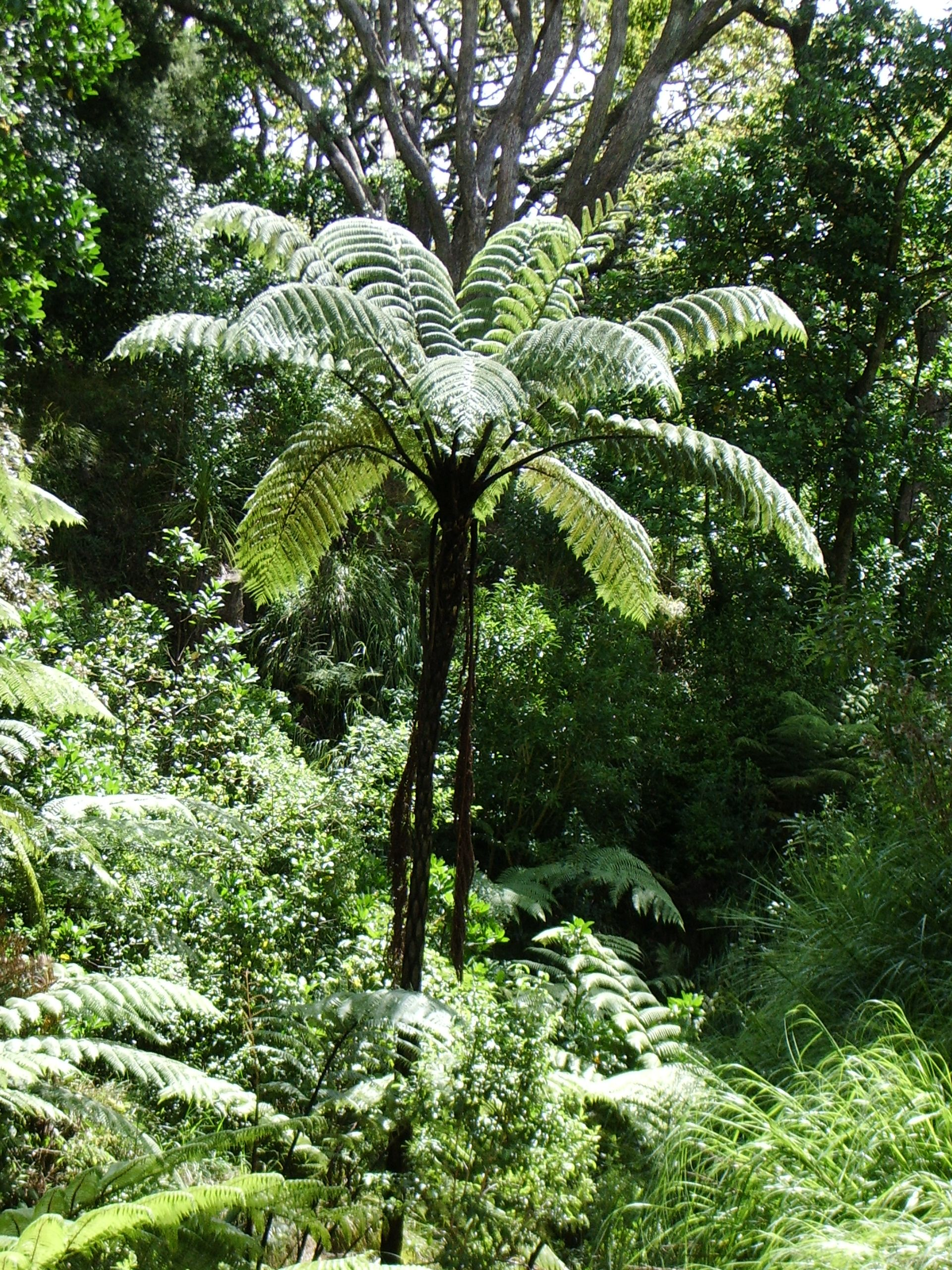
Mamaku.

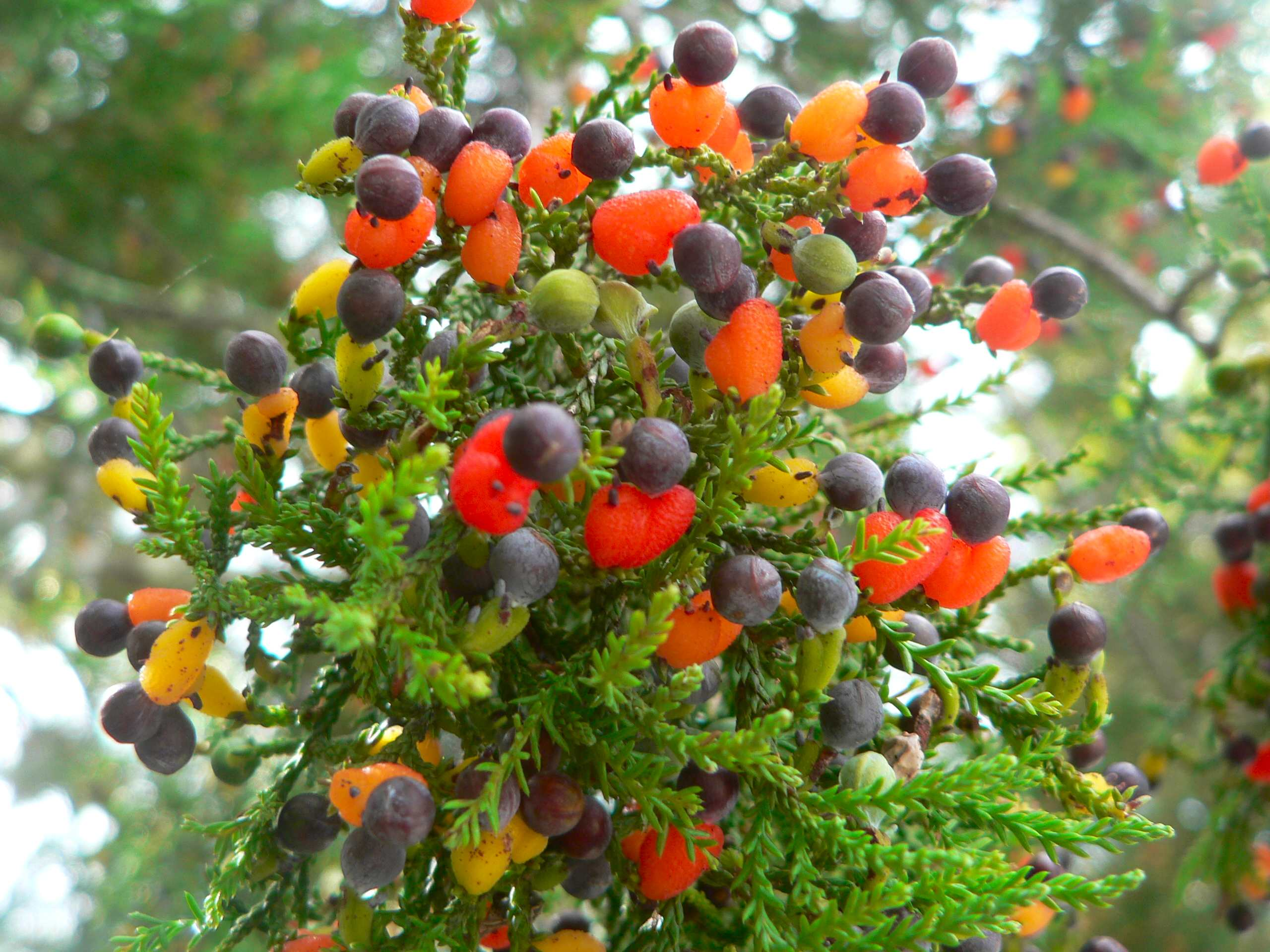
Ripe berries of kahikatea.

Rangiteaorere married two of his daughters to Uenukukōpako's son Tumahaurangi. The latter visited Rangiteaorere at Paetutu, near Tikitere, and asked his wives to ask Rangiteaorere to give him some mamaku (black tree fern) for a kūmara pit. Rangiteaorere found this insulting, so he killed Tumahaurangi and his brother Hauora. He fled to Pukepoto on Mount Ngongotahā. From there, he took his canoe to Te Ngae to collect kahikatea berries. Uenukukōpako's surviving sons saw his canoe and sailed out to kill him in revenge for the murder of their brothers. But Rangiteaorere's grandson, called Tutenui or Tutenauimaiwaho, who was among the attackers, shielded Rangiteaorere from attack with his cloak, allowing Rangiteaorere to safely continue his journey to Tikitere.

== Family ==
Rangiteaorere had four children:

- Kaiure
- Tutewhaiwha
- Apatakikawa
- Hinetekawa

== Bibliography ==
- Stafford, D.M. (1967). Te Arawa: A History of the Arawa People. Rotorua, New Zealand: A.H. & A.W. Reed.
- Mitchell, J. H. (2014). Takitimu: A History of Ngati Kahungunu. Libro International. ISBN 978-1-877514-72-2.
