= Ngāti Tamaihutoroa =

Māori iwi (tribe) in New Zealand

Ngāti Tamaihutoroa was a Māori iwi (tribe) of the Te Arawa confederation in the Rotorua region, established by the brothers Purahokura, Reretoi, Rongo Haua, Rongo Hape, and Pitaka, who were sons of Tamaihutoroa, the son of Īhenga. Through him they were descended from Tama-te-kapua, the captain of the Arawa canoe, which brought Te Arawa from Hawaiki to New Zealand. According to tradition, they slew three great taniwha (monsters): Hotupuku, Pekehaua, and Kataore. The last of these monsters was a protector of Ngāti Tangaroamihi, who went to war with Ngāti Tamaihutoroa to get revenge. Purahokura and Reretoi were killed and most of the rest of the tribe was driven out of the Rotorua region. Te Rangikāheke presented a written account of the deeds of the brothers to George Grey in 1849.

== Slaying monsters ==
=== Hotupuku ===
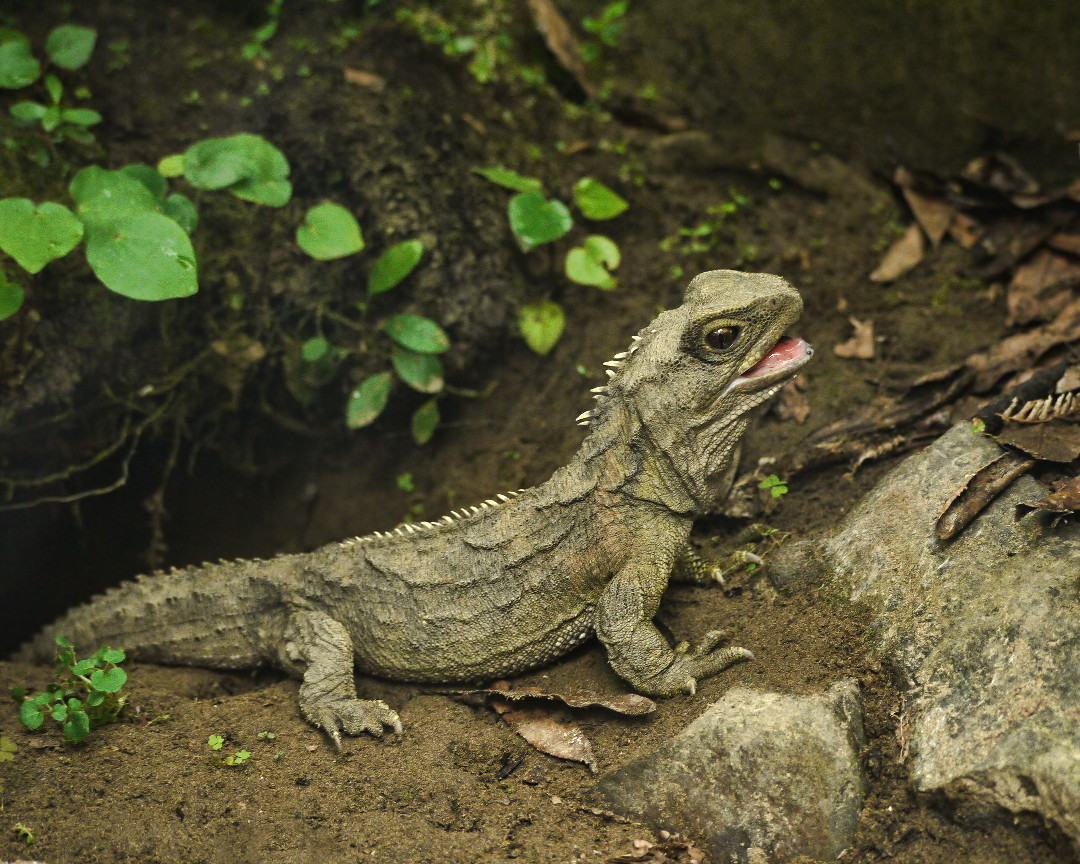
A tuatara.

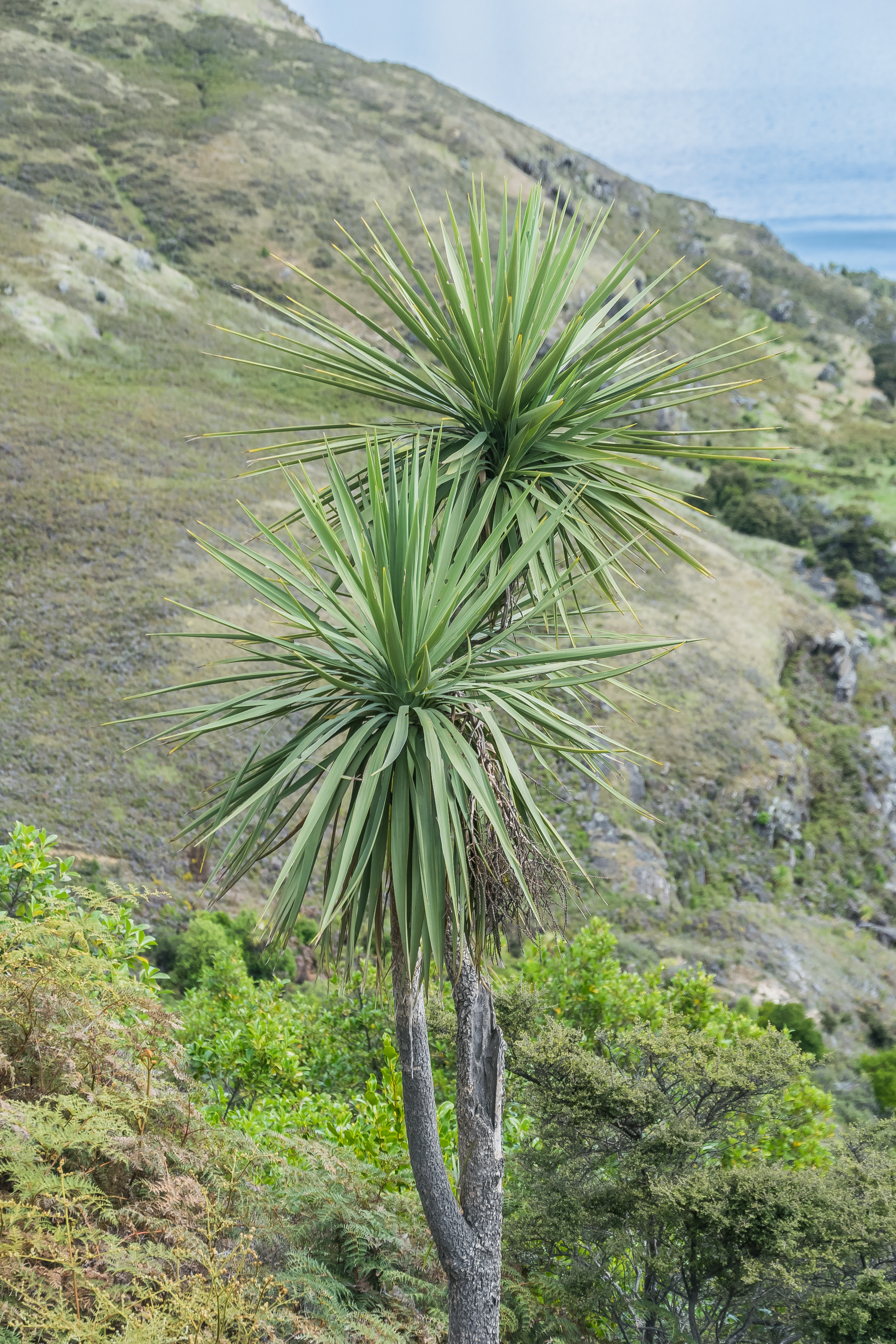
Whanake (Cordyline australis)

Travellers going between the Rotorua region and Lake Taupō had been disappearing as they passed Tauhunui, Tuporo and Tikitapu. Assuming that the disappearances were due to raiders, the people of Taupō sent out a war party to pacify the area. When they came to Kapenga Caldera in Kaingaroa Forest, they were attacked by the taniwha Hotupuku, described as a "beast armed with scales and spikes like a monster of the sea" that "seemed as large as a black whale and in shape like a tuatete" (tuatara). When the sons of Tamaihutoroa heard about this, they gathered up a war party of 340 men. They gathered the leaves of the whanake (Cordyline australis) and invented a range of new types of rope, called tari, tāmaka , whiri-pāraharaha, and rinorino. Then they armed themselves with kāheru (wooden digging implements), patu (clubs), taoroa (long spears), patu-parāoa (whalebone clubs), and meremere (greenstone club). They made a trap with their ropes and sent a group of men to the entrance of his cave to entice him out. The men were nearly caught by Hotupuku, but they successfully led him to the snare, where he was captured and killed after a fierce battle. Once he was dead they cut him open with mata-whaiapu (obsidian knives), mata-tuhua (another kind of obsidian knife), mira-tuatini (shark-tooth saws), kuku-moe-toka (mussel-shell saws), and ngaeo (another kind of mussel-shell saw). Inside his stomach they found many people - men, women, and children. There were also so many weapons that they compared it to the "wharehuata (armory) of Maui," as well as jewellery and cloaks. The men buried the monster's victims and then cooked and ate Hotupuku.

=== Pekehaua ===
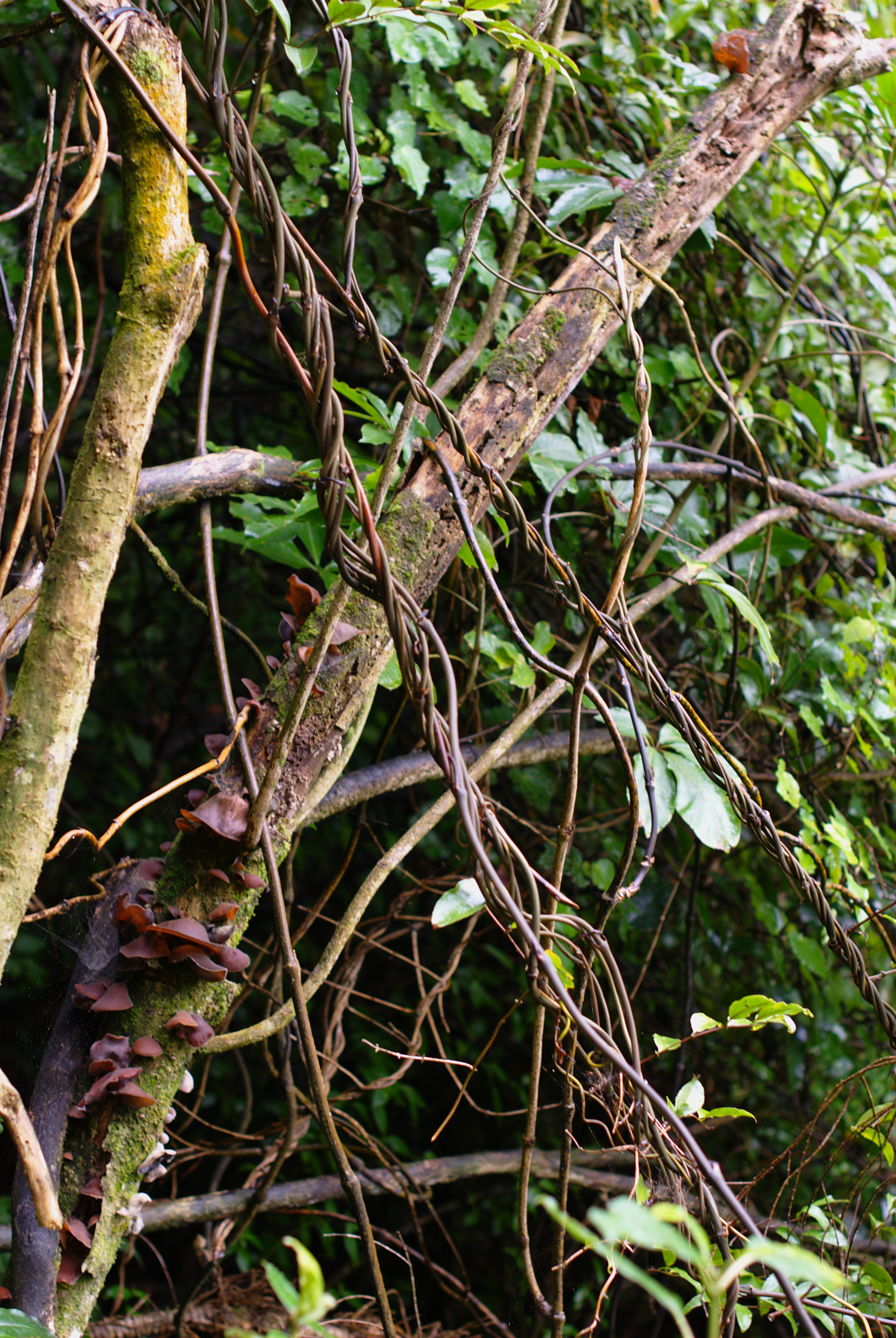
Kareao (supplejack)

When the news of this success reached the people of Rotorua, they sent a messenger called Hororita to tell them about another taniwha at Awa Hou, which was eating travellers between Rotorua on the one hand and Waikato and Patetere on the other. This taniwha was called Pekehaua and lived in a spring called Te Wharo Uri. He had spines on his back and looked like the calf of a black whale. The brothers gathered their party of 340 men once more and collected the vines of the kareao (supplejack). They wove these vines into a giant tāiki (basket), which they covered in pigeon feathers and attached a rope to. Then they travelled to Awa Hou, reciting the following karakia (incantations) as they went: puni, werotaniwha, and tumangai. When they reached Te Wharo Uri, Pitaka and his followers got inside the tāiki along with a large rock. The tāiki was thrown into the spring and sunk to the bottom, while the rest of the men on the shore sang karakia to weaken the monster. While Pekehaua was distracted by the men on the shore, Pitaka swam out of the tāiki and tied the rope around Pekehaua's middle. The men on the shore grabbed the other end of the rope and pulled him up onto the shore, where they killed him. They butchered the monster so that his ribs were left exposed, each one "like the trunk of Tāne Mahuta." Inside his stomach were the skeletons of many people, as well as loads of weapons, mats, and clothes. They buried the skeletons and ate Pukehaua's flesh.

=== Kataore ===
Finally, the people at Rotokākahi, Ōkataina, and Tarawera contacted the brothers. They had realised that there must be a ngārara (monster) that was eating people as they travelled past Lake Tikitapu. This monster was called Kataore. He had eyes "the colour of jet", "talons, spikes" and looked like a lizard. The people of Tikitapu were Ngāti Tangaroamihi, the descendants of Tuarotorua, who had two pā (fortified villages) there: Te Tokorangi and Taumahi. They were accustomed to feed Kataore and one of the women of the tribe, Hinemihi, considered Kataore to be her pet. Kataore never harmed the people of Ngāti Tangaroamihi, but attacked anyone from another tribe who passed by. The people of Rotokākahi, Ōkataina, and Tarawera therefore called on the brothers to come and kill Kataore. They made a meal of fernroot, pōhue (bindweed), īnanga (whitebait), and kākahi (freshwater mussel). Then they collected their ropes and set off, reciting karakia as they went. They searched for Kataore in the lake, singing karakia to make fish leap out of the lake, but the monster did not emerge. As they were doing this, however, they heard Kataore roaring from a cave in the cliff at Moerangi, so they gathered outside the cave. They sang karakia which calmed Kataore, so that the men were able to tie one rope around his neck and another around his front legs. Then they tied these ropes to trees outside the cave and dragged him out. He attacked wildly with his tail, but the rest of him was held fast by the ropes and the men killed him. People came from all around to see the carcass, "stretched out like a great whale cast up by the sea." Then they butchered him, once again finding inside him bodies, weapons, cloaks, and even a whole canoe.

== War with Ngāti Tangaroamihi ==
Ngāti Tangaroamihi considered the murder of Kataore a hostile act, so their warriors charged out and attacked Ngāti Tamaihutoroa near Ngapuna, driving them back to their own pā at Pukeroa Hill.

In response, Ngāti Tamaihutoroa formed a war party and conquered Te Tokorangi. Ngāti Tangaroamihi retreated to Taumahi, which was on Lake Ōkareka. Ngāti Tamaihutoroa attacked and conquered this pā, too, killing the leading chief, Marua. As a result, this was called the Battle of Marua.

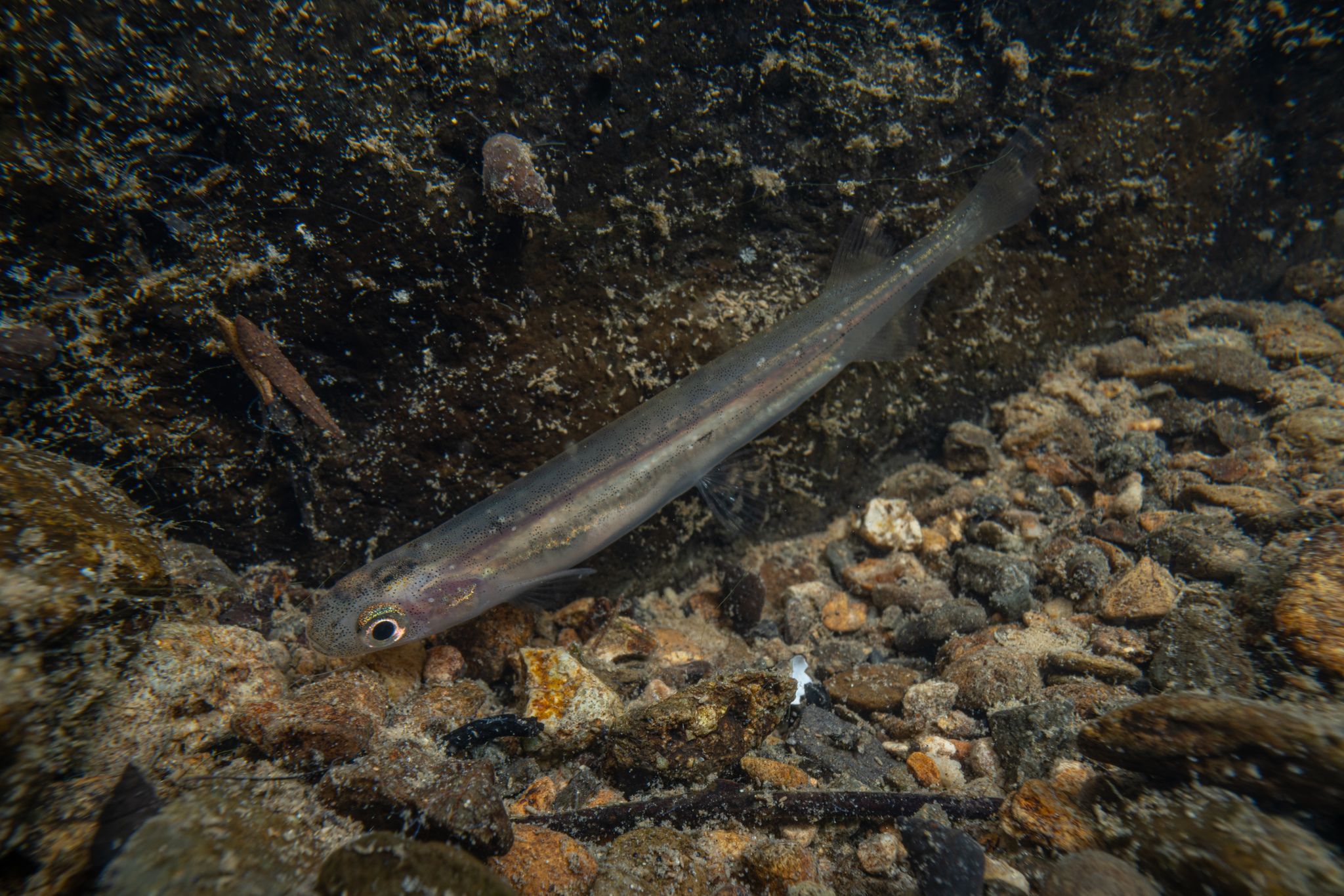
inanga (whitebait).

The surviving members of Ngāti Tangaroamihi made an alliance with members of Ngāti Rangitihi who were hostile to Ngāti Tamaihutoroa, namely the descendants of Apumoana, Rangiaowhia, and Kawatapuarangi. The force mustered at Taumahi and then marched towards Rotorua to attack Ngāti Tamaihutoroa. As they passed through the area of modern-day Ohinemutu, Ngāti Tamaihutoroa sallied forth and attacked them. There were such heavy losses on both sides that the battle was named Waiwhitinanga, because the dead scattered on the field looked like īnanga (whitebait) strewn on the beach. Purahokura and Reretoi were killed and Ngāti Tamaihutoroa was defeated.

After the battle, Ngāti Tamaihutoroa were forced to flee the region. The chiefs Uemarama, Uerata, Rongo Haua, Rongo Hape, and Rangitu led part of the tribe to Motuwhanake on the Waikato River. Another part of the tribe went to Taupō. Ruamano, the son of Reretoi, and his relatives remained in the Rotorua region because he was married to Waiarohi, a granddaughter of Uenukukōpako. They resided at Papohatu and Pukehangi in the Tihi-o-Tonga hills.

== Bibliography ==
- Stafford, D.M. (1967). Te Arawa: A History of the Arawa People. Rotorua, New Zealand: A.H. & A.W. Reed.
