= Mokai Power Station =

Geothermal power station in New Zealand

- Country: New Zealand
- Location: Waikato
- Coordinates: 38°31′50″S 175°55′32″E
- Status: Operational
- Commission date: 2000
- Owner: Tuaropaki Power Company

Power generation
- Nameplate capacity: 113 MW
- Annual net output: 930 GWh

External links
- Website: www.tuaropaki.com

The Mokai Power Station is a geothermal power station owned by the Tuaropaki Power Company and operated by Mercury NZ Limited. It is located approximately 30 km north west of Taupō in New Zealand. The station uses a binary cycle manufactured by Ormat Industries.

The Tuaropaki Power Company is 75% owned by the Tuaropaki Trust and 25% by Mighty River Power.

The plant was initially constructed in 1999 as a 55 MW geothermal power station. An additional 40 MW was added in 2005 and in 2007 plant capacity was increased to 110 MW.

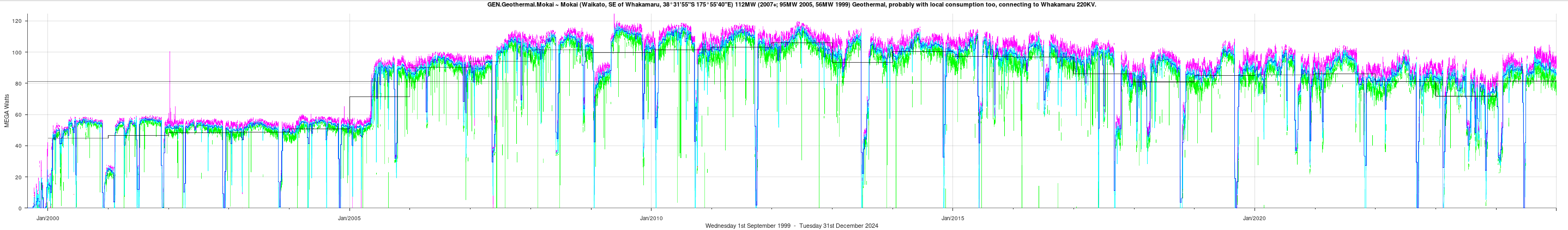
Electricity Generation at Mokai.

== See also ==
- Geothermal power in New Zealand
- List of power stations in New Zealand
