= Tainui =

New Zealand Māori tribal confederation

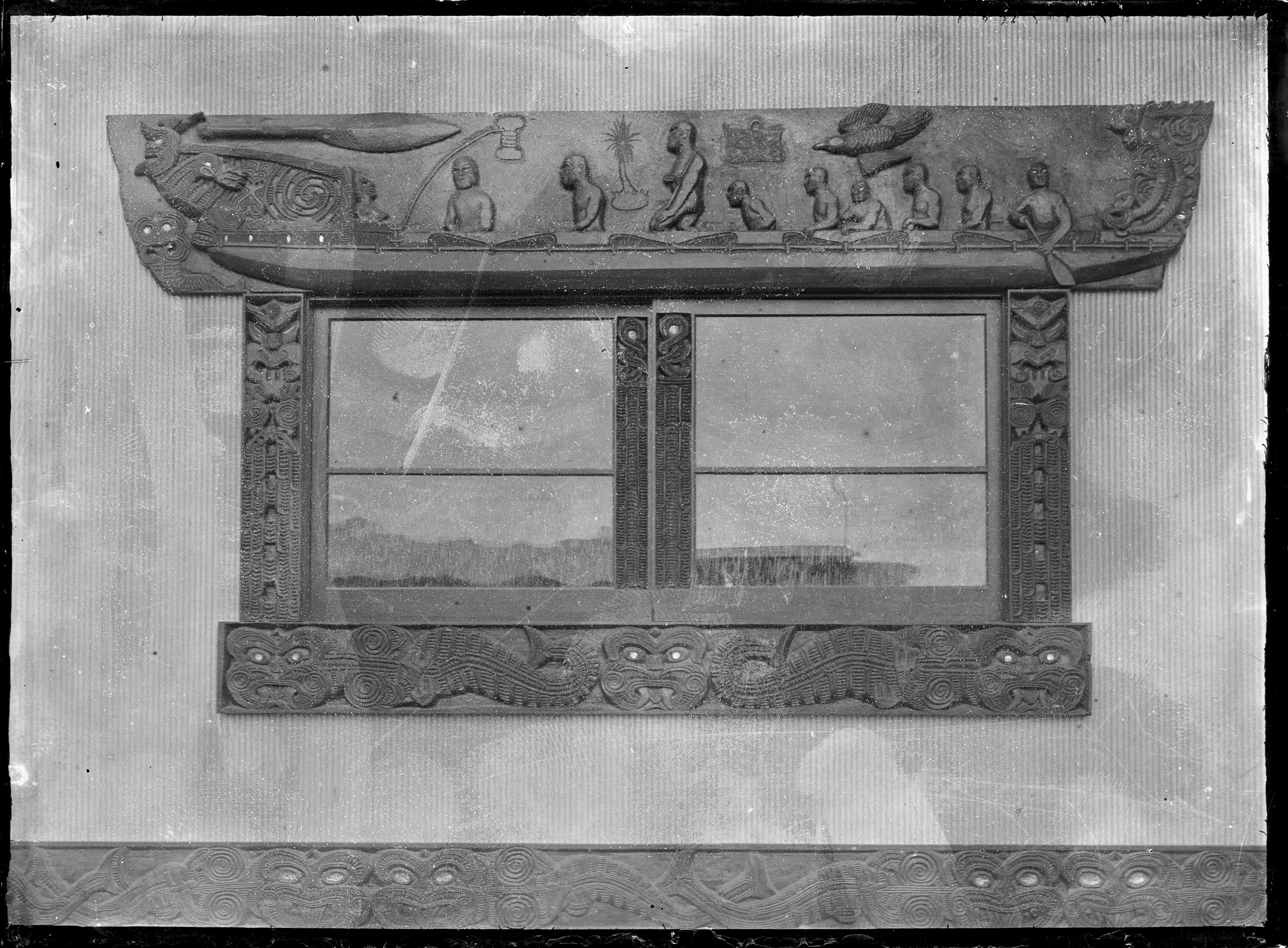
The korupe (carving over the window frame) at Mahina-a-Rangi meeting house at Turangawaewae Marae, Ngāruawāhia showing the Tainui canoe with its captain Hoturoa. Above the canoe is Te Hoe-o-Tainui, a famous paddle, the kete (basket) given to Whakaotirangi by a tohunga of Hawaiki, the bird Parakaraka (front) who was able to see in the dark, and another bird who warned of approaching daylight. Photograph by Albert Percy Godber circa 1930s

Tainui is a tribal waka confederation of New Zealand Māori iwi. The Tainui confederation comprises four principal related Māori iwi of the central North Island of New Zealand: Hauraki, Ngāti Maniapoto, Ngāti Raukawa and Waikato. There are other Tainui iwi whose tribal areas lay outside the traditional Tainui boundaries – Ngāi Tai in the Auckland area, Ngāti Raukawa ki Te Tonga and Ngāti Toa in the Horowhenua, Kāpiti region, and Ngāti Rārua and Ngāti Koata in the northern South Island.

== History ==
=== Early history ===
The Tainui iwi share a common ancestry from Polynesian migrants who arrived in New Zealand on the Tainui waka, which voyaged across the Pacific Ocean from Hawaiki to Aotearoa (North Island) approximately 800 years ago. According to Pei Te Hurinui Jones, a Tainui historian, Tainui first entered the Waikato around the year 1400, bringing with them kumara plants. By the end of the seventeenth century, Tainui had conquered much of the Waikato region following the conclusion of the Siege of Pōhatu-roa.

=== Contact with Europeans ===
During the late 1840s and early 1850s European missionaries introduced Tainui to modern inventions such as the water mill and gave then instruction in how to raise various European crops: potatoes were particularly widely planted. They set up a trade school in Te Awamutu to educate young Tainui so they became literate and taught the basics of numeracy and farming skills. Two mills were built to grind the wheat into flour – one near Cambridge on a stream leading to the Waikato River, parts of the mill being still visible. Later in the 1850s, six others were built in the general area. Produce was exported as far as Victoria and California.

The relationship was far from one-sided. The Tainui tribe provided food to the European settlers, and "the present European population…would have been literally starved out of the country but for the extraordinary exertions made by the aboriginal inhabitants to supply them with cheap provisions", as the Southern Cross newspaper reported in 1844. A year later, when the less than 4,000 settlers of Auckland were under threat from an attack by Ngāpuhi from the south, Tainui rangatira Te Wherowhero responded to a request to assist with the planned attack, "You must fight me if you come on to Auckland; for these Europeans are under my protection", referring to Auckland as the "hem of his cloak" and placing it under his personal tapu.

During this time large numbers of new migrants came to Auckland and Te Wherowhero established a house in Māngere so he could oversee trade and get advice from the government. For a brief period until the mid-1850s, Tainui made a good return from selling food to the new settlers but this came to a sudden end when traders realised they could get food – especially flour – much cheaper from New South Wales. Tainui set up a bank at Cambridge to take the deposits of Māori traders; it was burnt down by the people when it was found that chiefs were using the money as their own.

Relationships between Europeans and Tainui soured as Europeans began to outnumber Māori (around 1858, across all of New Zealand), stopping them from being dependent on friendly tribes for food and protection. At the same time as respect for even high-ranking Māori waned, desire for land settled by them grew among Europeans. At the outbreak of the First Taranaki War, "friendly Māori" in Auckland had to be issued with arm badges to protect them from assault.

Tainui people were expelled from the Auckland area in 1863 because of their refusal to take the oath of allegiance to the Crown and hand in their weapons, which the governor thought posed a threat to Auckland and the new settlers as it had done in Taranaki.

=== Kīngitanga ===
Tainui were the tribe responsible for setting up the Kīngitanga in 1858 – a pan-Māori movement of mainly central North Island iwi who aimed at establishing a separate Māori nation with a Māori king. The key aim was the refusal of the Kingites to sell land to the government. The first Māori king was the Waikato warrior Te Wherowhero, who came from a line of prominent rangatira. Tainui, who had conquered much Taranaki land, sent warriors to help fight the settlers and British soldiers in Taranaki to prevent minor chiefs selling land to the government. Missionaries at Te Awamutu told the Kīngitanga they would be considered rebels by the government after they refused to take an oath of allegiance to the Crown. Te Awamutu was a missionary settlement built by the missionaries and Māori Christians in July 1839 after they observed Tainui cannibals who had been fighting at Rotorua return with 60 backpacks of human remains and proceed to cook and eat them in the Otawhao pa.

=== British invasion of the Waikato ===
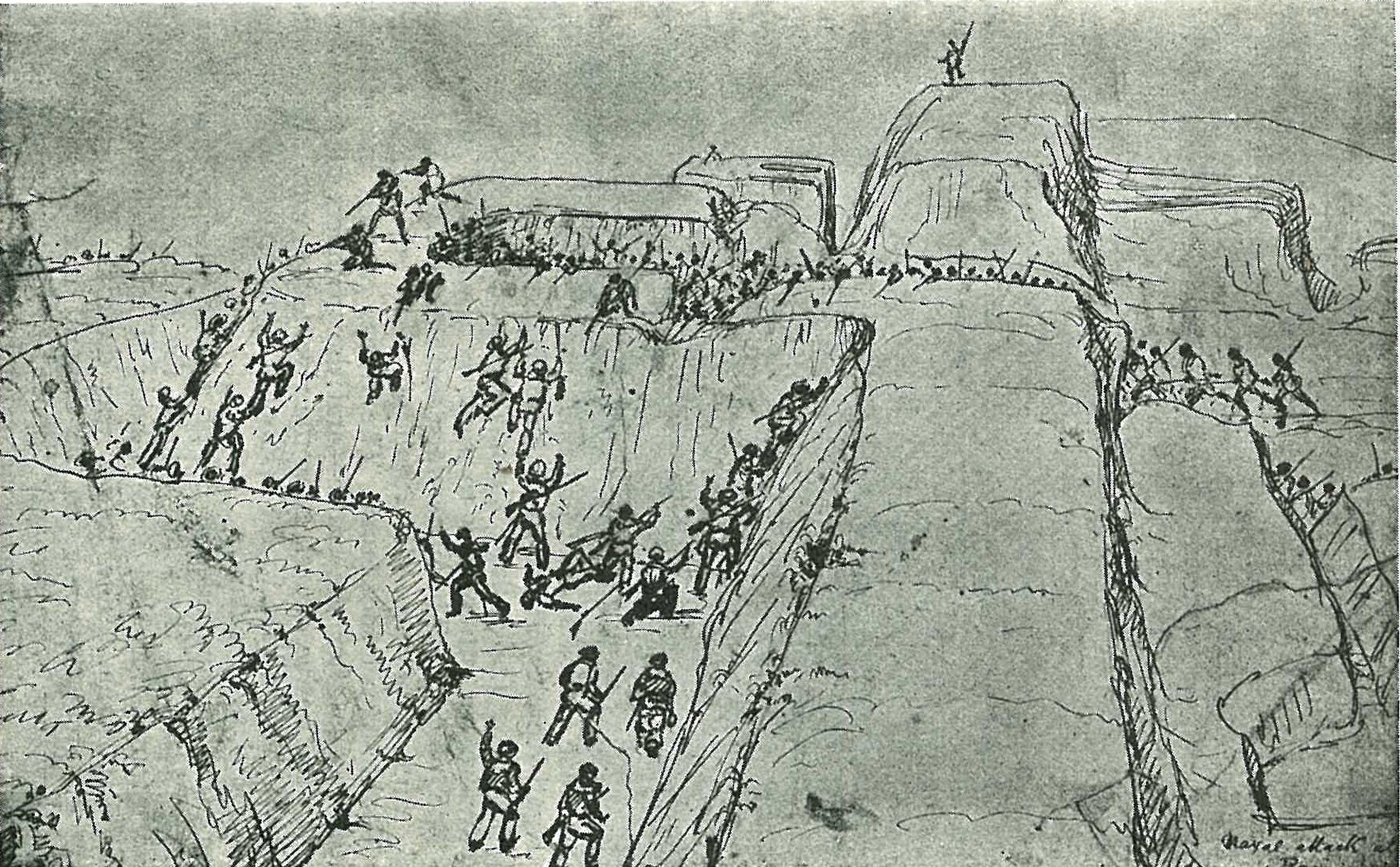
Tainui forces repulse a British attack at the Battle of Rangiriri, 1863.

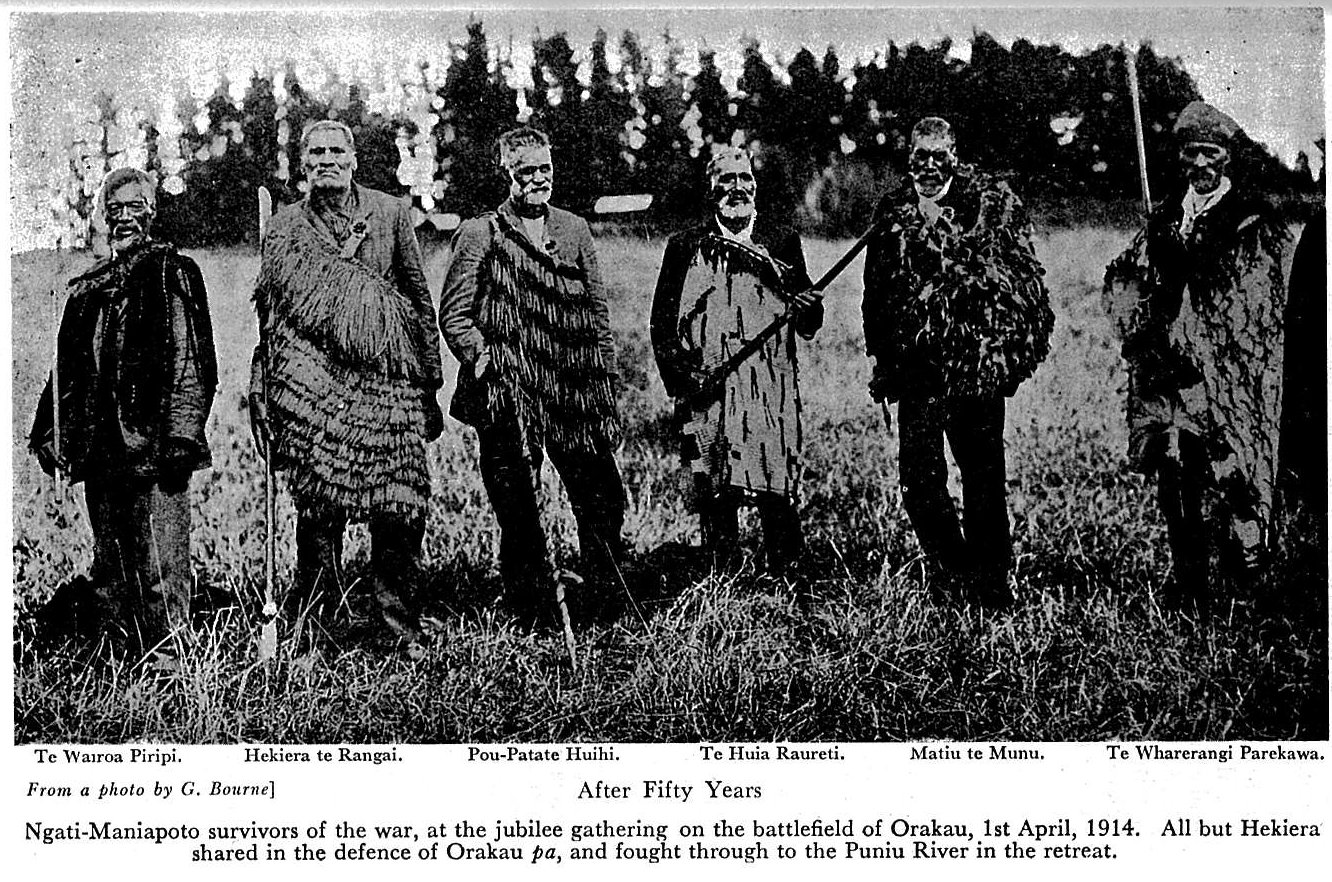
Ngāti Maniapoto survivors of the war, at the jubilee gathering on the battlefield of Ōrākau, 1 April 1914.

The growth of the king movement led Governor Thomas Gore Browne to conclude that they would have to be compelled to submit to British rule. After attempting to achieve a peace settlement through "kingmaker" Wiremu Tamihana, in mid-1861 he sent an ultimatum to the movement's leaders. When it was rejected he began drawing up plans to invade the Waikato and depose the king. After a pause, these plans were continued by his successor Governor George Grey, who used troops from the newly formed Commissariat Transport Corps to start construction work on the so-called Great South Road from Drury to the Kingite border at the Mangatāwhiri Stream near Pōkeno.

Events in early 1863 brought tensions to a head. In March Kingites obstructed the construction of a police station at Te Kohekohe, near Meremere. Rewi Maniapoto, accompanied by Wiremu Kīngi Te Rangitāke, led a raid on the property at Te Awamutu occupied by magistrate and Commissioner John Gorst. The raiders sent a message to Gorst—who was absent at the time—to quit the property or risk death; Grey recalled Gorst to Auckland soon after. On 4 June, British troops attacked Tainui Māori at Tataraimaka.

On 9 July 1863 Grey issued a new ultimatum, ordering that all Māori living between Auckland and the Waikato take an oath of allegiance to Queen Victoria or be expelled south of the river. British forces under Duncan Cameron crossed the Mangatāwhiri Stream and invaded the Waikato on 12 July 1863. The kingitangi forces were defeated at the Battle of Rangiriri on 20–21 November 1863 and on 8 December the Kingite capital at Ngāruawāhia was abandoned to Cameron's troops. A new defensive line was built to the south, centered on Paterangi, the largest system of Māori fortifications built during the New Zealand Wars, which was designed to block the main approaches to the agriculturally rich Rangiaowhia district, east of Te Awamutu. On 20 February 1864, Cameron by-passed the fortress and attacked Te Awamutu directly, where he massacred civilians. The kingite forces withdrew; Wiremu Tamihana went east to Maungatautari to block a British advance up the Waikato River into Ngati Raukawa territory. Rewi Maniapoto moved south into the Hangitiki Valley to defend Ngati Maniapoto bases. He was encircled at Ōrākau on 30 March 1864 and forced to withdraw to the south on 1 April.

After their defeat at the hands of the British and kūpapa Māori, who fought alongside the troops, King Tāwhiao and his people were forced to retreat into the heartland of Ngāti Maniapoto, establishing a quasi-autonomous community based around the Kīngitanga, known as the King Country, south of a border known as the aukati ('boundary'). Under the New Zealand Settlements Act, which had been passed in December 1863, Governor Grey confiscated more than 480,000 hectares of land from the Tainui iwi (tribe) in the Waikato as punishment for their "rebellion". The war and confiscation of land caused heavy economic, social and cultural damage to Waikato-Tainui. The Maniapoto, by contrast, had been more zealous for war than the Waikato, yet suffered no loss of land because its territory was too remote to be of use to white settlers. Some Tainui, such as Wiremu Te Wheoro of Ngati Naho, who was a magistrate for the Pokeno area and later became a Māori MP, fought with the British during the invasion.

=== Living in the King Country ===
They established their own press, police force, laws and governing body. Europeans who entered the Kīngitanga area were killed. However, because the country was unproductive and the people cut themselves off from European civilization they struggled to develop the Kīngitanga ideal. A number of Pākehā had lived with Ngāti Maniapoto since 1842 such as the French trader Louis Hetet. All of them married Māori women. Drunkenness became a problem among the Kingitanga supporters south of the Puniu, particularly after the arrival of Te Kooti, who had a long established drinking problem from his youth. Friction broke out between the Maniapoto hosts who wanted to engage with the European settlers and the conservative Kīngitanga adherents who wanted to retain power and remain isolated.

=== Peace ===
Over time the more forward thinking ideas of Maniapoto prevailed, land was sold to the government and work was given to Tainui men on roads and on the main trunk line railway. Māori men were given the vote and Māori were given four Members in Parliament who all argued strongly for modernisation and acceptance of the benefits of Pākehā civilization. Following this schools, stores and churches were built. Some of the Tainui leaders were employed by the government as advisors or given government pensions in recognition of their change of heart and willingness to engage with the government. Tainui continued to work behind the scenes to recover the remainder of the land they believed was wrongly confiscated (120,000 acres (490 km^{2}) was returned by 1873) from them after their defeat during the land wars. Some land or reserves were given back to Tainui but this act caused intra-tribal friction for many years because most of the land retained by the government was in the north and central Waikato. None of the Maniapoto land was confiscated, despite the fact they were the most actively hostile iwi in Taranaki and during the Waikato campaign, and this annoyed the other Tainui iwi.

=== Return of confiscated land and compensation ===
120,000 acres (490 km^{2}) of land was returned to the rebels a few months after the British victory. In 1926 a government commission agreed to pay an annual payment of £3000. Te Puea, the main force in Tainui leadership, indicated to the government that the tribe was prepared to accept money in compensation for the confiscated land. In April 1946 an additional payment of £5000 (later $15,000) per annum was made in perpetuity – this was considered a full and final payment by the Crown, but although accepted by the Kingitanga royalty some members remained discontented as they wanted land. This was a deal worked out directly between Tainui leadership and the Prime Minister Fraser after a hui at Turangawaewae. The deal was accepted by Roore Edwards speaking for Te Puea. Tainui have been actively seeking a resolution to their ongoing grievance over the 1863 confiscation of lands, water rights, and harbour rights. Tribal members were annoyed that the leadership appeared to be frittering away the large annual income on expensive hui. Most of the funds were spent on administration costs, grants to marae for functions such as tangi and entertaining visitors. In 1995 as part of the Treaty of Waitangi settlement the tribe received a second lot of compensation amounting to $195 million, made up of cash and parcels of land in and around Hamilton such as the former air force base at Te Rapa, now called The Base. The compensation is a little over 1 percent of the value of the lands taken as a result of the 1863 invasion.

== Tainui business ==
At first many of the investments made were poor such as a fisheries deal, the purchase of the Auckland Warriors rugby league team and a hotel in Singapore, which all failed. A financial overhaul and the separation of the Kīngitanga from Tainui business enterprise has paid dividends. The construction of The Base shopping complex has been a winner for the iwi, drawing many retail customers from the Hamilton central business district. Tainui business supports the Kīngitanga financially, as well as fostering tertiary education for tribal members with grants. Tainui has very close links with Waikato University and each year the university closes down during major Tainui celebrations. From 2002 until 2008 Tainui was also the name of a Māori electorate in Parliament. It was replaced by the Hauraki-Waikato electorate.

In 2009 it was announced that Tainui Group Holdings was to develop farm land adjacent to the Ruakura Research Station and University of Waikato and plan to establish an inland hub for the redistribution and repackaging of containerized products complementing the ports of Auckland and Tauranga. Ruakura will be centered around the existing and planned infrastructure being the East Coast Main Trunk railway line and the proposed Waikato Expressway. Ruakura is intended to support more freight by rail versus road, thus reducing CO_{2} emissions and congestion around the ports of Auckland and Tauranga. Tainui have said that this may provide up to 12,000 jobs and will be a 30–50 year project. The project will include a 195ha Logistics precinct, 262ha Light Industrial precinct, 108ha Innovation precinct, 3 retail areas, 1,800 mixed density houses and over 60ha of public open space for walk and cycle ways, ecological and storm water functions.

The project has been approved by an independent Board of Inquiry, which will enable development to start in 2015 which will provide much needed employment and amenities to the eastern side of Hamilton.

In 2008 Tainui started work on developing a luxury $10 million resort at Lake Taupō. The business failed with the onset of the recession and the assets were valued by Jones, Lang, Lasalle registered valuers, at about $3 million. The failure of this venture under the direction of Mike Pohio Tainui Holdings CEO has raised questions about the ability of the iwi to develop the $3 billion inland port. Few details of the Taupō disaster have been made public. The Waikato Times in September 2014 reported internal friction in the tribe between those who see the Port development as risky and those favouring a higher risk model. After the failure of the Taupō venture the tribe is uneasy about risking its asset base on such a huge venture. In November 2014 a new marae based management structure was voted in designed to rein in risky development.
