= Ātiamuri =

- Hydro village
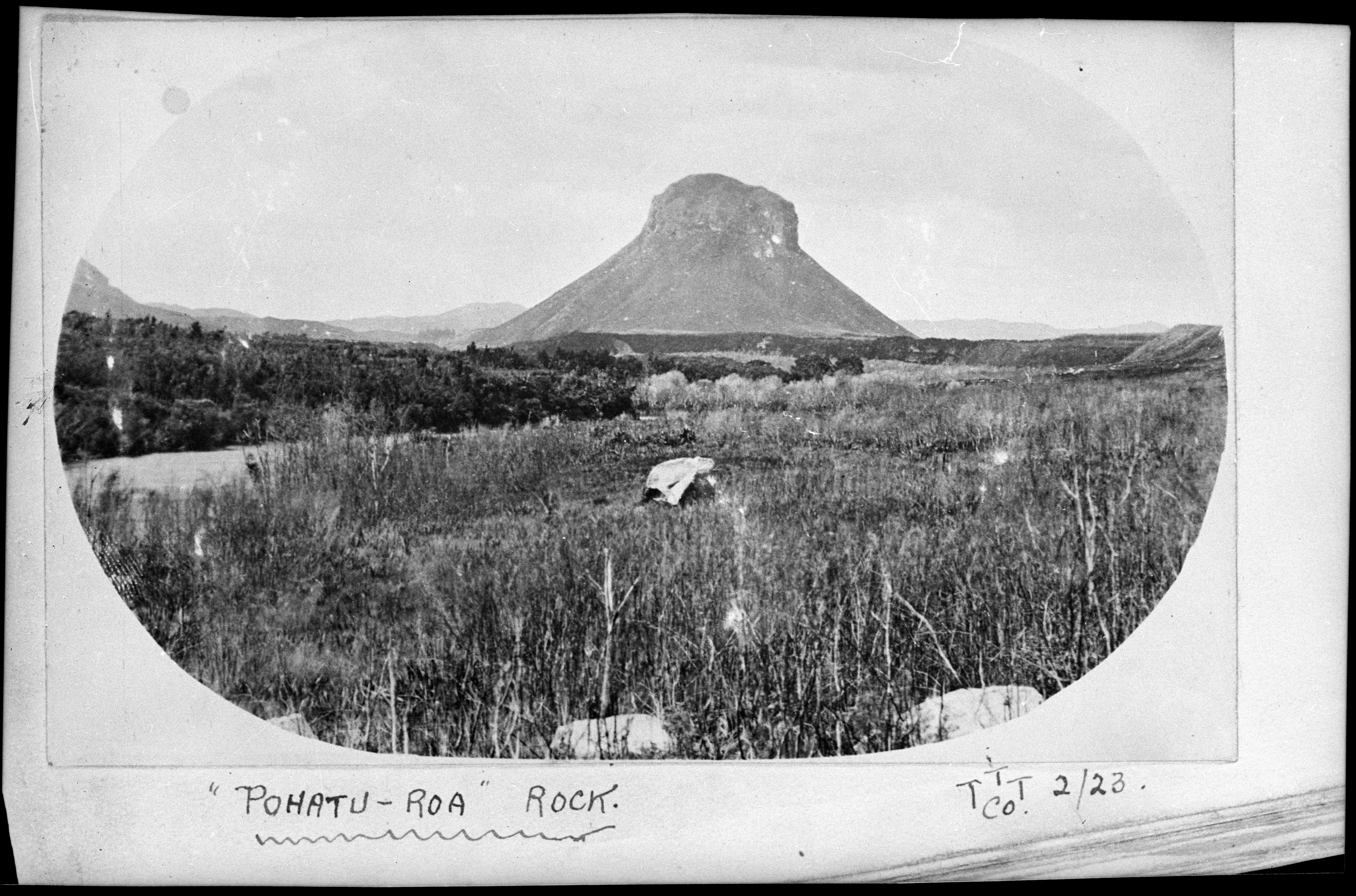
- Pōhaturoa Rock, 1923
- Interactive map of Ātiamuri
- Coordinates: 38.3937°S 176.0280°E
- Country: New Zealand
- Region: Waikato region
- District: Taupō District
- Ward: Mangakino-Pouakani General Ward
- Electorates: Taupō; Te Tai Hauāuru (Māori)

Government
  - Territorial Authority: Taupō District Council
  - Regional council: Waikato Regional Council
  - Mayor of Taupō: John Funnell
  - Taupō MP: Louise Upston
  - Hauraki-Waikato MP: Hana-Rawhiti Maipi-Clarke

Area
  - Total: 1.34 km^{2} (0.52 sq mi)

Population (June 2025)
  - Total: 80
  - Density: 60/km^{2} (150/sq mi)

Ātiamuri is a former hydro village in the central North Island of New Zealand. It lies alongside State Highway 1 about 27 km south of Tokoroa and 38 km north of Taupō. It is bordered by the Waikato River and surrounded by pine plantations. Upper Ātiamuri, just north of the Waikato River, is a small community of lifestyle blocks, dairy farms and farm servicing businesses.

Pohaturoa Rock (520 m) (also known as Mount Pohaturoa) is a distinctive volcanic plug that dominates the landscape. It overlooks Lake Ātiamuri which was formed behind the hydroelectric Atiamuri Power Station. This very visible rocky outcrop is significant in both Arawa and Ngāti Raukawa history, having been a strategic observation post during intertribal conflicts.

== Demographics ==
The area known as Ātiamuri is entirely within the Waikato Regional Council area but is in three district council areas: Rotorua Lakes, South Waikato and Taupo. Ātiamuri village is in the Taupō District.

Statistics New Zealand describes Ātiamuri village as a rural settlement, which covers 1.34 km^{2} (0.52 sq mi). It had an estimated population of 80 as of June 2025, with a population density of 60 people per km^{2}. The village is part of the larger Ohakuri statistical area.

Historical population
Year	Pop.	±% p.a.
2006	66	—
2013	63	−0.66%
2018	72	+2.71%
2023	72	+0.00%

Ātiamuri village had a population of 72 in the 2023 New Zealand census, unchanged since the 2018 census, and an increase of 9 people (14.3%) since the 2013 census. There were 39 males and 36 females in 24 dwellings. The median age was 41.0 years (compared with 38.1 years nationally). There were 15 people (20.8%) aged under 15 years, 15 (20.8%) aged 15 to 29, 33 (45.8%) aged 30 to 64, and 12 (16.7%) aged 65 or older.

People could identify as more than one ethnicity. The results were 54.2% European (Pākehā), 50.0% Māori, 8.3% Pasifika, and 4.2% Asian. English was spoken by 100.0%, Māori by 16.7%, and other languages by 4.2%. No language could be spoken by 4.2% (e.g. too young to talk). The percentage of people born overseas was 20.8, compared with 28.8% nationally.

Religious affiliations were 33.3% Christian, 16.7% Māori religious beliefs, and 4.2% other religions. People who answered that they had no religion were 41.7%, and 0.0% of people did not answer the census question.

Of those at least 15 years old, 3 (5.3%) people had a bachelor's or higher degree, 36 (63.2%) had a post-high school certificate or diploma, and 21 (36.8%) people exclusively held high school qualifications. The median income was $40,000, compared with $41,500 nationally. 3 people (5.3%) earned over $100,000 compared to 12.1% nationally. The employment status of those at least 15 was 24 (42.1%) full-time and 6 (10.5%) part-time.

== Atiamuri Power Station ==
Atiamuri Power Station is a hydroelectric power station on the Waikato River owned by Mercury Energy. It has a total capacity of 84 MW and was first commissioned in 1958.

== Education ==
Upper Atiamuri School is a co-educational state primary school for Year 1 to 8 students, with a roll of 56 as of July 2026. The school was first mentioned in a newspaper in 1941.

== In popular culture ==
Atiamuri was a filming location for the 1956 short film People of the Waikato and the 2018 feature film Alien Addiction. Pōhaturoa Rock is visible in several establishment scenes in the latter film.

== Ōngāroto ==
The site of the former village of Ōngāroto is about 3.9 miles (6.3 km) west of Atiamuri, near Ōngāroto Marae on Ōngāroto Road. During the early twentieth century Ōngāroto had a sawmill, railway station, and school. The village was served by southern section of the TTT Railway which closed in 1944.

== Climate ==
Climate data for Ātiamuri Power Station (1971–1989)
Month	Jan	Feb	Mar	Apr	May	Jun	Jul	Aug	Sep	Oct	Nov	Dec	Year
Record high °C (°F)	35.0 (95.0)	32.3 (90.1)	28.9 (84.0)	25.2 (77.4)	26.5 (79.7)	23.5 (74.3)	20.2 (68.4)	20.0 (68.0)	23.7 (74.7)	25.4 (77.7)	28.3 (82.9)	31.5 (88.7)	35.0 (95.0)
Mean maximum °C (°F)	30.2 (86.4)	29.3 (84.7)	26.0 (78.8)	22.9 (73.2)	19.4 (66.9)	16.9 (62.4)	15.9 (60.6)	17.1 (62.8)	19.2 (66.6)	22.1 (71.8)	25.3 (77.5)	27.4 (81.3)	30.8 (87.4)
Mean daily maximum °C (°F)	24.1 (75.4)	24.2 (75.6)	22.1 (71.8)	18.9 (66.0)	15.2 (59.4)	12.6 (54.7)	12.2 (54.0)	13.3 (55.9)	15.2 (59.4)	17.4 (63.3)	20.2 (68.4)	22.2 (72.0)	18.1 (64.7)
Daily mean °C (°F)	17.8 (64.0)	17.9 (64.2)	16.2 (61.2)	13.0 (55.4)	9.8 (49.6)	7.9 (46.2)	7.0 (44.6)	8.0 (46.4)	10.0 (50.0)	12.2 (54.0)	14.6 (58.3)	16.4 (61.5)	12.6 (54.6)
Mean daily minimum °C (°F)	11.5 (52.7)	11.6 (52.9)	10.2 (50.4)	7.1 (44.8)	4.4 (39.9)	3.1 (37.6)	1.7 (35.1)	2.7 (36.9)	4.8 (40.6)	6.9 (44.4)	8.9 (48.0)	10.5 (50.9)	7.0 (44.5)
Mean minimum °C (°F)	5.1 (41.2)	5.1 (41.2)	3.0 (37.4)	0.9 (33.6)	−2.1 (28.2)	−3.1 (26.4)	−3.3 (26.1)	−3.1 (26.4)	−1.8 (28.8)	0.8 (33.4)	2.0 (35.6)	3.9 (39.0)	−4.4 (24.1)
Record low °C (°F)	1.9 (35.4)	2.5 (36.5)	−0.1 (31.8)	−1.5 (29.3)	−6.0 (21.2)	−6.9 (19.6)	−5.3 (22.5)	−4.9 (23.2)	−3.8 (25.2)	−2.5 (27.5)	−1.9 (28.6)	1.0 (33.8)	−6.9 (19.6)
Average rainfall mm (inches)	92.2 (3.63)	80.8 (3.18)	96.5 (3.80)	88.2 (3.47)	113.7 (4.48)	112.5 (4.43)	118.4 (4.66)	116.8 (4.60)	118.7 (4.67)	124.9 (4.92)	97.2 (3.83)	126.5 (4.98)	1,286.4 (50.65)
Source: Earth Sciences NZ
