= Bruce Biggs =

New Zealand linguist (1921–2000)

Bruce Biggs CBE FRSNZ
- Born: 4 September 1921; Auckland, New Zealand
- Died: 18 October 2000 (aged 79); Auckland, New Zealand
- Spouse: Joy Te Ruai Hetet (m. 1945)
- Children: 4
- Awards: Elsdon Best Medal

Academic background
- Education: MA University of Auckland; PhD Indiana University Bloomington
- Thesis: The Structure of New Zealand Maaori (1957)

Academic work
- Discipline: Māori Studies
- Institutions: University of Hawaii; University of Auckland
- Notable students: Pat Hohepa, Sir Sidney Moko Mead, Ranginui Walker, Sir Robert Mahuta, Koro Dewes, Roger Oppenheim, Richard Benton, Wharehuia Milroy, Bernie Kernot, Merimeri Penfold, Sir Tamati Reedy, Dame Anne Salmond, David Simmons, David Walsh, Peter Ranby, Sir Pita Sharples, Parehuia Hopa, Margaret Orbell, Bill Nepia, Margaret Mutu

Bruce Grandison Biggs CBE FRSNZ (4 September 1921 – 18 October 2000) was a New Zealand linguist and an influential figure in the academic field of Māori studies in New Zealand. The first academic appointed (1950) to teach the Māori language at a New Zealand university, he taught and trained a whole generation of Māori academics.

== Early life ==
Born in Auckland of Ngāti Maniapoto descent, Biggs attended New Lynn Primary School and Mt Albert Grammar School, where he was a contemporary of Rob Muldoon and a lifelong friend of the historian Keith Sinclair. He qualified as a teacher at Auckland Teachers College and served during World War II in the New Zealand Expeditionary Force in Fiji, where he became fluent in Fijian and collected word lists, grammar notes and folklore. After the war he married Joy Te Ruai Hetet and they had three children; Biggs already had a fourth child. They taught in Te Kao and Waiorongomai, near Ruatoria. During these rural postings Biggs began to learn the Māori language.

== University career ==
In 1950 he won appointment to the first position in a New Zealand university dedicated to the teaching of the Māori language. The idea for this position came from Ralph Piddington, then head of the Anthropology Department at the University of Auckland. From 1951 to 1955 Biggs taught Stage 1 Māori language while completing his BA studies in education and anthropology. Proposals to advance Māori language study above Stage I level initially received much condemnation from academics in other disciplines: they expressed concerns about the lack of a sufficient body of written material on which to base a syllabus. Biggs was able to successfully refute these claims, which led to the establishment of a Stage 2 Māori curriculum. After completing his MA, he took leave to study structural linguistics at Bloomington, Indiana, where in 1957 he completed a PhD thesis entitled The Structure of New Zealand Maaori.

== Linguistics ==
In 1958 Biggs and Jim Hollyman founded the Linguistics Society of New Zealand and its journal Te Reo and soon after Biggs began teaching linguistics courses in the Auckland University anthropology programme. In 1965, Biggs started working on compiling Polynesian lexicon dictionary Pollex. Within ten years Auckland had become the centre of Polynesian linguistics, and Biggs taught for two years at the University of Hawaii in 1967–1968 before returning to New Zealand in 1969, where he remained until he retired in 1983.

=== Orthography for Māori ===
Biggs was a major proponent of the double-vowel orthography for Māori, in which long vowels are marked by a doubling of the vowel (e.g., kaakaariki). This approach had the advantage at that time that it could readily be used using existing typewriter technology. However, the Māori Language Commission, the official body overseeing the language set up by Māori Language Act 1987, chose to standardise the use of macrons to represent long vowels (e.g., kākāriki), which have the advantages of retaining the familiar appearance of words, and of not disturbing alphabetical order.

== Death ==
Biggs died in Auckland on 18 October 2000.

== Legacy ==
Biggs taught a number of people who went on to become well known academics in Māori studies, including Pat Hohepa, Hirini Mead, Ranginui Walker, Sir Robert Mahuta, Koro Dewes, Roger Oppenheim, Richard Benton, Wharehuia Milroy, Bernie Kernot, Merimeri Penfold, Tamati Reedy, Dame Anne Salmond, David Simmons, David Walsh, Peter Ranby, Pita Sharples, Parehuia Hopa, Margaret Orbell, Bill Tawhai, Bill Nepia and Margaret Mutu.

Biggs was elected a Fellow of the Royal Society of New Zealand in 1969. He served as president of the Polynesian Society from 1979 to 1993, and in 1985 received the Society's Elsdon Best Memorial Medal.

In the 1986 New Year Honours, Biggs was appointed an Officer of the Order of the British Empire, for services to Māori studies and linguistics. He was promoted to Commander of the Order of the British Empire, for services to education and the Māori people, in the 1996 New Year Honours.

== Selected bibliography ==
Biggs published over 100 books and articles on Māori language and culture, Polynesian comparative linguistics, Polynesian languages and literature as well the Fijian and Rotuman languages. His most well-known books include:

- Maori Marriage (1960)
- The Complete English–Maori Dictionary (1966)
- Let's Learn Māori: a guide to the study of the Māori language (1969) (revised editions 1973, 1998) In 2025, this book was selected as one of the 180 most significant works of Māori-authored non-fiction.
- Jones, Pei Te Hurinui (1995). Nga Iwi o Tainui: The Traditional History of the Tainui People / Nga Koorero Tuku Iho a Nga Tuupuna. Edited and annotated by Bruce Biggs. Auckland: Auckland University Press. ISBN 1-86940-119-0. 402 pages.
