= Te Maori: Te Hokinga Mai =

Exhibition of Māori Art

- New Zealand touring exhibition of Māori art, 1986–1987
- Country: New Zealand
- Opened: National Museum of New Zealand
- Via: Tūhura Otago Museum; Robert McDougall Art Gallery
- Closed: Auckland Art Gallery
- Follows: Te Maori

Te Hokinga Mai (Māori: the return home) was a touring exhibition of Māori art gathered from major museum collections throughout New Zealand. The exhibition was initially organised by the American Federation of Arts and toured four North American cities as Te Maori (sometimes Te Māori in modern sources) in 1984 to 1986. Upon completion of the North American tour the exhibition returned to New Zealand in 1986 and was rebranded Te Maori: Te Hokinga Mai – The Return Home. It toured to the four major metropolitan centres in New Zealand; Auckland, Wellington, Christchurch and Dunedin.

== Background ==
Te Maori opened at the Metropolitan Museum of Art in New York in September 1984. The exhibition featured 174 customary carved Māori art items from the collections of 12 museums in New Zealand. The exhibition was met with such success in North America that a New Zealand tour was planned. Upon its return to New Zealand in 1986 the exhibition was rebranded and travelled the country starting at the National Museum, Wellington (August – October 1986), Otago Museum, Dunedin (November 1986 – February 1987), the Robert McDougall Art Gallery, Christchurch (March – May 1987) and finally to the Auckland Art Gallery (June – September 1987).

== Development ==
The exhibition was initially organised by the American Federation of Arts under the curatorship of Douglas Newton of the New York Metropolitan Museum, David Simmonds, of the Auckland Museum and Hirini Moko Mead. As part of its New Zealand tour as Te Hokinga Mai new art works were added including textiles.

== Art works ==
Te Maori featured 174 unique and ancient Māori art treasures. While lauded for putting Māori art on the global stage, the exhibition also received criticism for its exclusion of arts associated with Māori women and contemporary art. The return to New Zealand as Te Hokinga Mai enabled some of these criticisms to be addressed.

== New Zealand tour ==
In 1986 and 1987 the exhibition toured to the four metropolitan centres of New Zealand, Auckland, Wellington, Christchurch and Dunedin. It was the most expensive exhibition ever to tour New Zealand but due to a further financial commitment from the primary sponsor Mobil New Zealand it remained free entry. Instead visitors were asked for koha, a voluntary gift. The exhibition enabled urban Māori to reconnect with museum-held taonga and their wider tribal histories.

New Zealand locations had active public and education programmes, including a nine-week programme developed by June Mead aimed at both Māori and Pākehā audiences. Kapa haka performances and film screenings were also regular events. During that time, different iwi were in charge of protocol, other programmes such as demonstrations of weaving, and tasks such as training kaiarahi (on-the-floor guides) each week.

At the same time Maori Art Today, an exhibition of contemporary Māori artists curated by Darcy Nicholas and Cath Brown, toured New Zealand. It was intended to complement the more historic focus of taonga in Te Hokinga Mai, and included works in both traditional and adopted media.

== Reception ==
As Te Māori made international headlines, New Zealanders awoke to the nation's unique Māori point of difference and the public appetite for a national tour grew. Māori leaders saw the tour as a chance for more Māori to interact with their heritage. On its return to New Zealand, the exhibition was rebranded and the organising committee worked with each venue to facilitate wider Māori participation.

It is estimated that 917,500 people visited the exhibition at its four New Zealand locations, which represented 28% of the total population.

== Legacy ==
Ray Waru made a film Te Māori – Te Hokinga Mai.

Te Hokinga Mai precipitated and inspired more Māori to work in museums and galleries. With these new professionals came increased use of Māori customs and language within these institutions. Increased exposure to Māori relationships to their art or taonga as living treasures resulted in repatriation programmes between overseas museums and New Zealand.
