= Sidney Moko Mead =

New Zealand anthropologist and historian

Sir Sidney Moko Mead KNZM
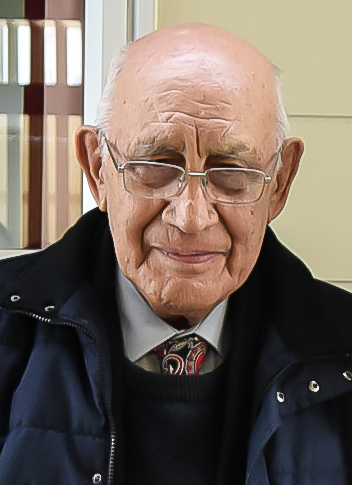
- Mead in 2019
- Born: Hirini Moko Haerewa Mead; 8 January 1927; Wairoa, New Zealand
- Died: 29 May 2026 (aged 99); Whakatāne, New Zealand
- Spouse: June Walker (m. 1949; died 2019)
- Children: 3, including Linda Tuhiwai Smith

Academic background
- Education: University of Auckland (BA, MA); University of Southern Illinois (PhD)
- Thesis: Polynesian hafted adzes: a comparative study of form and decoration (1968)
- Doctoral advisor: Bruce Biggs

Academic work
- Discipline: Anthropology; history; Māori studies
- Institutions: McMaster University; University of British Columbia; Victoria University of Wellington

Sir "Sidney" Hirini Moko Haerewa Mead KNZM (8 January 1927 – 29 May 2026) was a New Zealand anthropologist, historian, artist, teacher, writer and prominent Māori leader. Initially training as a teacher and artist, Mead taught in many schools in the East Coast and Bay of Plenty regions, and later served as principal of several schools. After earning his PhD in 1968, he taught anthropology in several universities abroad. He returned to New Zealand in 1977 and established the first Māori studies department in the country. Mead later became a prominent Māori advocate and leader, acting in negotiations on behalf of several tribes and sitting on numerous advisory boards. He also wrote extensively on Māori culture. Mead was the chair of the council of Te Whare Wānanga o Awanuiārangi.

== Early life ==
Sidney Moko Mead was born in Wairoa, Hawke's Bay, on 8 January 1927, the eldest of eight children of Sidney Montague Mead, a Pākehā from Wairoa, and Paranihia "Elsie" Moko, a Māori from Te Teko in the Bay of Plenty. He was of Ngāti Awa, Ngāti Tūwharetoa, Ngāi Tūhoe and Tūhourangi descent.

Growing up during the Great Depression, much of Mead's childhood was spent in the care of his grandmother while his mother lived elsewhere working. He attended Te Teko Native School until age nine, at which age he was taken in by a foster family in Murupara. There he was enrolled in the Rangitahi Native School. One of his teachers at the Murupara school was Bruce Biggs, who later became a prominent Māori academic and mentor to a generation of Māori scholars. During his high school years, Mead received a scholarship to St Stephen's Anglican College at Bombay, before transferring to Te Aute College, a Māori school in Hawke's Bay.

== Teaching career ==
In 1944, Mead attended teaching college in Auckland, specialising in Māori education and art. He began teaching in Māori schools in the East Cape region, starting off at Manutahi District High School in Ruatoria and working as an itinerant teacher in many schools across the East Coast. In 1949, he also married June Te Rina Walker, of Ngāti Porou. Mead later taught in schools in the neighbouring Bay of Plenty region, including in the Urewera Valley, Whakatāne, Tauranga and Te Kaha.

Mead became a headmaster of several schools in the region. His first appointment as headmaster was at Minginui Māori School in the Urewera Valley, where he remained in the position for eight years. He later took up headmaster positions at Waimārama Māori School and Whatawhata School. Formalising his academic qualifications, Mead earned a Diploma in Teaching in 1962, followed by Bachelor and Master of Arts degrees at the University of Auckland, which were both completed by 1965. Mead earned his PhD at the University of Southern Illinois in 1968, with his former teacher Bruce Biggs acting as one of his supervisors.

== Academic career ==
Mead taught abroad during the early 1970s, including at McMaster University and the University of British Columbia in Canada. After finishing a stint as associate professor at McMaster University's anthropology department, he returned to New Zealand and became the first professor of Māori at the Victoria University of Wellington. After his arrival in 1977, established the first Department of Māori Studies in the country, as well as introducing Cook Island and Samoan Studies.

In the early 1980s, Mead was largely responsible for the establishment of Te Herenga Waka Marae, the first university-based marae on a mainstream campus. Mead retired from Victoria University of Wellington in 1991.

== Te Māori exhibition ==
Mead was one of the curators of the 1984 landmark exhibition, Te Māori. This exhibition toured museums throughout the United States from 1984 to 1986 and then throughout Aotearoa New Zealand as Te Maori: Te Hokinga Mai ('the return home') from 1986 to 1987. Mead travelled alongside a large group of kuia, kaumātua and a cultural group who supported the exhibition showcasing their rich living culture.

During the plane trip back to Aotearoa New Zealand, Mead discussed the overseas impact of Te Māori and the reception from American and Pākehā audiences:

So we now know that the reaction of the American public at New York was no accident, because it's been the same at St. Louis. And the same at San Francisco, the impact has been very similar. And the reaction of the American people to Māori culture has been the same in all three places.

You contrast that to the reaction at home, where, from a Māori point of view, the Pākehā reaction at home is muted, it's definitely muted, and it's definitely not open and forthcoming as we've seen here, overseas.

And any praise for Māori culture is not given very willingly by a Pākehā audience and I believe it's got something to do with our colonial experience and our history, that we can't quite rid ourselves of, the attitudes that belong to our past.

And for the Māori people to actually come out of New Zealand and go and do what is virtually our culture – doing our cultural thing – it's a liberating experience for them to realise that their culture is beautiful and that other people react to it in a powerful emotional way … crying at the beauty which they see in our people, and the fact that our people have so much to give to them.

And so, what we're getting at all of these venues overseas was a confirmation to the Māori people that we've been right, we've been right to hold fast to our culture to hold fast to Māoritanga, that we really do have something to give to the world at large. And if the New Zealand Pākehā rejects it well, I think from now on what we have to say is, 'that's their hard luck'.

— RNZ, Ngā Taonga Sound Archives: Te Māori

Mead was the editor and one of the core authors of the Te Māori catalogue that accompanied the exhibition.

== Māori leader ==
From the 1970s onwards, Mead became more involved in tribal affairs, particularly those of Ngāti Awa. He helped to establish the Ngāti Awa Trust Board in 1980, the first representative body for the tribe in the 20th century. For almost 20 years the Trust Board helped to research and prepare Ngāti Awa's case for historical redress with the Waitangi Tribunal. This led to the publication of the Ngāti Awa Raupatu Report in 1999, which outlined Ngāti Awa's historical grievances dating back to the New Zealand Wars and subsequent land confiscations. Mead acted as chief negotiator for the tribe during settlement negotiations with the Crown. Five years from the publication of the raupatu report, a settlement between Ngāti Awa and the Crown was reached in 2003 and enacted by the government in 2005. Professor Mead also became the inaugural chair of the new Te Rūnanga o Ngāti Awa.

In 1992, Mead helped to establish Te Whare Wānanga o Awanuiārangi based in Whakatāne, which in 1997 became the third wānanga in the country recognised under the Education Act 1989. He served on numerous advisory boards, including the New Zealand Bioethics Council, the New Zealand Council for Educational Research, Toi Māori and Te Māori Manaaki Taonga Trust. Five years after successfully concluding Ngāti Awa's settlement with the Crown, Mead was chosen as the inaugural chair of the Institute for Post Treaty Settlement Futures, an initiative of Te Whare Wānanga o Awanuiārangi with support from Te Rūnanga o Ngāti Awa, which aims to provide strategies to help iwi with settlement negotiations with the Crown as well as managing settlement assets.

Mead was appointed to the Waitangi Tribunal in 2003. He was a panel member for a number of Waitangi Tribunal inquiries, including the National Park district inquiry and the Te Rohe Potae district inquiry.

In the 2006 Queen's Birthday Honours, Mead was appointed a Distinguished Companion of the New Zealand Order of Merit, for services to Māori and education. In the 2009 Special Honours, following the reintroduction of titular honours by the government, Mead accepted redesignation as a Knight Companion of The New Zealand Order of Merit.

== Personal life and death ==
Mead's wife, June, Lady Mead, died on 27 March 2019. Linda Tuhiwai Smith, a professor of education, is their daughter.

Mead died in Whakatāne on 29 May 2026, at the age of 99.

== Selected works ==
- 1995: Te Toi Whakairo: The Art of Māori Carving. Auckland: Reed Publishing.
- 1996: Tawhaki: The Deeds of a Demigod. Auckland: Reed Publishing.
- 1997: Māori Art on the World Scene. Wellington: Āhua Design and matau Associates Ltd.
- 1999: Taniko Weaving: Technique and Tradition. Auckland: Reed Publishing.
- 2001: with Neil Grove, Ngā Pepeha a Ngā Tupuna: The Sayings of the Ancestors. Wellington: Victoria University Press, ISBN 086473462X.
- 2003: Tikanga Māori – Living by Māori Values. Wellington: Huia Publishers.
- 2010: with June, Lady Mead, The People of the Land: Images and Māori Proverbs of Aotearoa New Zealand. Wellington: Huia Publishers.

== Bibliography ==
- Barrowman, Rachel (1999). Victoria University of Wellington, 1899–1999: a history. Victoria University Press. ISBN 0-86473-369-0.
- Diamond, Paul (2003). A fire in your belly: Māori leaders speak. Wellington: Huia Publishers. ISBN 1-86969-030-3.
