= David Simmons (ethnologist) =

New Zealand ethnologist, historian and author

David Simmons MBE
- Born: David Roy Simmons; 6 September 1930; Auckland, New Zealand
- Died: 30 November 2015 (aged 85); Auckland, New Zealand
- Other names: D. R. Simmons; Rawiri Te Puru Terehou
- Occupations: Ethnologist; historian; author
- Spouse: Winifred Mary Harwood (m. 1955; died 2003)
- Children: 2
- Awards: Elsdon Best Memorial Medal; Auckland Museum Medal

David Roy Simmons MBE (6 September 1930 – 30 November 2015), also known as Rawiri Te Puru Terehou, was a New Zealand ethnologist, historian and author.

== Early life and family ==
Born in Auckland on 6 September 1930, Simmons was educated at Sacred Heart College, Auckland. He went on to study at Auckland Teachers' College from 1948 to 1950, Auckland University College from 1949 to 1950, and Victoria University College in 1951. He then studied in France, at the University of Paris, the École du Louvre and the University of Rennes, gaining two diplomas, before returning to Auckland where he graduated with a Master of Arts degree in 1962.

In 1955, Simmons married Winifred Mary Harwood, and the couple went on to have two children.

== Career ==
From 1962 to 1968, Simmons was the keeper in anthropology at Otago Museum in Dunedin. He was appointed as the ethologist at the Auckland Institute and Museum in 1968, and became the assistant director of Auckland War Memorial Museum in 1978, serving in that role until 1986.

Simmons was a co-curator and a member of the organising committee for the international exhibition Te Maori, which toured the United States and New Zealand from 1984 to 1987. Simmons also contributed to the exhibition's catalogue. He served as a council member of the Otago Institute, the Polynesian Society and the New Zealand Archaeological Association, and as secretary of the Umupuia Marae Trust.

Simmons wrote many books relating to Māori art, culture and history, including:

- The Maori Hei-tiki (1966) with Henry Devenish Skinner
- The Great New Zealand Myth (1976)
- Tā Moko (1986)
- Whakairo (1994)

He is credited with effectively demolishing Percy Smith's "great fleet" hypothesis.

Simmons also edited:

- J.D.H. Buchanan's The Māori History and Place Names of Hawke's Bay (1973)
- George Graham's Maori Place Names of Auckland (first published 1980).

== Honours and awards ==
In 1978, Simmons received the Elsdon Best Memorial Medal. In the 1985 Queen's Birthday Honours, he was appointed a Member of the Order of the British Empire, for services to ethnology and the Māori people, and in 2013 he was awarded the Auckland Museum Medal and appointed an associate emeritus of Auckland War Memorial Museum.

== Later life and death ==
Simmons lived in the Auckland suburb of Remuera, and died on 30 November 2015. His ashes were buried at Purewa Cemetery in Auckland with those of his wife, Winifred Simmons, who predeceased him in 2003.
