= Koro Dewes =

Māori language revivalist (1930–2010)

Te Kapunga Matemoana "Koro" Dewes (7 April 1930 – 17 August 2010) was a kaumātua of the Ngāti Porou iwi of New Zealand. He was a pioneer of Māori education and an advocate for the Māori language.

== Biography ==
Dewes attended Horoera Native Primary School and won a scholarship to Wesley College, where he became dux and head prefect. He went to Ardmore Teachers' College (now part of the University of Auckland) in 1949 and taught at Tikitiki District High School and St. Stephen's Anglican Māori boarding school. From 1962 to 1966, he lectured in the University Extension Department (adult education) of the University of Auckland, and then was appointed as a lecturer in Māori language at the Victoria University of Wellington. At Wellington, he helped to extend courses to allow students to complete a degree major in Māori language. He wrote a master's thesis on the work of composer Henare Waitoa, which was submitted in Māori in 1972. The title of the master's thesis was Ngā waiata haka a Hēnare Waitoa o Ngāti Porou (modern dance-poetry by Hēnare Waitoa of Ngāti Porou). He was awarded an honorary doctorate of literature (DLitt) by Victoria in 2002.

Dewes returned to the East Cape area in 1976, where in 1987 he helped form Te Runanga o Ngati Porou, an organisation which has championed and facilitated a strategic vision for the Ngāti Porou.

Māori Affairs Minister Pita Sharples said Dewes "was a partisan rather than a diplomat" who "has been an inspiration for language activists from every iwi, and for indigenous peoples around the world."
