= Te Maori =

Exhibition of Māori art

- touring exhibition of Māori art, 1984–1986
- Country: United States
- Country of origin: New Zealand
- Opened: Metropolitan Museum of Art
- Via: Saint Louis Art Museum; De Young Museum
- Closed: Field Museum of Natural History
- Exhibited: 174 Taonga
- Curator: Sidney Moko Mead
- Organiser: American Federation of Arts; New Zealand Government
- Sponsor: National Endowment for the Arts; National Endowment for the Humanities; Air New Zealand
- Funder: Mobil Oil Corporation
- Followed by: Te Maori: Te Hokinga Mai

Te Maori (or sometimes Te Māori in modern sources) was a landmark exhibition of Māori art (taonga (Note: The word in te reo Māori is broader than artwork, referring to anything of value, including socially and culturally valuable objects, resources, and ideas, and is sometimes translated into English as 'treasures'.)) that toured the United States from 1984 to 1986, and New Zealand as Te Maori: Te Hokinga Mai ('the return home') from 1986 to 1987.

Te Māori was the first time Māori art had been exhibited internationally in an art context instead of as part of ethnographic collections. The involvement of tangata whenua and iwi throughout the exhibition process had an impact on the development of museum practices in New Zealand and globally in regard to Indigenous and source community authority. The exhibition and its subsequent effects on the cultural landscape in New Zealand were considered a milestone in the Māori renaissance.

== Background ==
Since the first contact between Māori and Pākehā, Maori social and cultural objects were traded, taken and collected for inclusion in private collections and museums. Among taonga collected were human remains.

Reflective of museums at the time, these objects were collected, catalogued and displayed ethnographically, misrepresenting Māori and displaying them and their culture as a part of natural history rather than creators of culture that might be exhibited in an artistic context. Tamaki Paenga Hira Auckland War Memorial Museum holds a large collection of Māori taonga which historically followed an ethnographic framework to catalogue and display material culture. This approach is being challenged and revitalised through a mātauranga Māori approach that looks at the collection through a Māori lens.

Until the late twentieth century museum visitors and staff were unlikely to be Māori, and taonga were interpreted in the light of Western intellectual frameworks. One such example was a museum display of human remains, 'mokamokai' (now referred to as toi moko; preserved heads of Māori, whose faces had been adorned with tā moko). Displaying human remains of this kind was popular in Western museums, which Māori found both 'disappointing' and 'culturally insensitive.' Repatriation processes are now in place in many museums to return these ancestors home to New Zealand.

In 1986, Māori activist, Hana Te Hemara, organised the Kakahu Fashion Project, which ran fashion shows with Maori designers alongside the Te Maori: Te Hokinga Mai exhibitions in New Zealand. This was widely considered a more humanising display and celebration of Māori culture.

Outside of a museum context, the Māori renaissance had already begun, driven by leaders including Āpirana Ngata and the Māori Women's Welfare League. Many traditional crafts, including carving, tukutuku and kowhaiwhai, were being revived, along with the Māori language.

== Exhibition development ==
The idea of a major exhibition of Māori artworks that would tour the United States was first raised in 1973 by Douglas Newton, Evelyn A. J. Hall and John A Friede from the Metropolitan Museum of Art, alongside Paul Cotton, the New Zealand Consul General in New York. Though the idea was well-received, including by New Zealand Prime Minister Norman Kirk, delays were caused by Kirk's passing and a general lack of funding for the project.

In 1979 Douglas Newton and Wilder Green of the American Federation of Arts raised the idea again, and in 1981 the New Zealand Cabinet approved the exhibition in principle. The Nga Māngai o Te Māori management committee was formed in April 1981 to organise the exhibition. Committee members included Māori anthropologist, historian and artist Sidney 'Hirini' Moko Mead, Mina McKenzie and Piri Sciascia.

The exhibition was supported by the Queen Elizabeth II Arts Council with funding from Mobil Oil. Mobil's sponsorship posed a potential barrier to the exhibition, when Taranaki decided to withdraw consent for the inclusion of their taonga in 1983, due to coastal pollution coming from the partly Mobil-owned Motonui synthetic petrol plant. Unlike previous exhibitions and displays of Māori taonga in museums, iwi had to give permission for the artworks to be included, highlighting the difference between museum ownership and authority. This change was seen as an outcome of political and cultural advocacy by Māori since the 1960s.

Mead was appointed co-curator of the exhibition. During the planning process, the objects displayed were intentionally named as 'taonga' by the involved institutions, acknowledging more meaning than the term 'artwork'.

== Works and displaying taonga ==
Te Māori included 174 taonga, most being whakairo (carved wood) or carved pounamu (greenstone). The majority of the taonga came from the collections of 12 New Zealand institutions, 51 loaned by Auckland Institute and Museum and 38 from the National Museum (once called Dominion Museum). One came from the collections of the University of Pennsylvania Museum.

A centrepiece of the exhibition was a Tainui carving, Te Uenuku, noted as one of the oldest carvings in New Zealand, being dated between 1200 and 1500. Te Uenuku was almost not included in the expedition because it was considered too fragile to travel, however Maori Queen Te Atairangikaahu decided it needed to be included.

The Te Māori exhibition highlighted a movement away from ethnographic treatment of objects. This was reflected in the display of taonga, giving them individual focus through exhibition design features such as spacing and lighting, more closely associated with displays of fine art in art gallery spaces. In 1983, the National Museum trialled this method of display, exhibiting taonga from their collections that would be shown in Te Maori at the Academy of Fine Arts. This approach to displaying taonga legitimised them as fine art.

== Inclusion of tikanga Māori ==
A fundamental aspect ofTe Māori was the inclusion of tikanga Māori, practices and values guided by te ao Māori or Māori worldview. This included dawn ceremonies, traditional karakia, speeches in Māori, waiata and kapa haka, during which some warriors had moko on their faces. Accompanying the taonga with these practices was described as 'the complete package' by Piri Sciascia, making it clear that the objects were part of a living culture and that Māori were both the artistic and spiritual guardians on their own culture.

This was particularly significant because Māori carving involves important cultural ideas around identity, ancestral embodiment and mana. Mead described the effect at the prestigious institution of the Met:

It did much to make tikanga Māori more acceptable not only to the population at large of Aotearoa but, more importantly, among our own people.

— Sir "Sidney" Hirini Moko Haerewa Mead

Groups of Māori from several iwi travelled with the exhibition to supervise installation and care of the taonga, perform ceremonies, and participate in events. Carvers and weavers were invited to travel from New Zealand to demonstrate their craft at each US venue, including James Rickard, Taparoto Nicholson, Rangi Hetet and Erenora Puketapu-Hetet.

== USA tour ==
Te Māori opened at the Metropolitan Museum of Art (the Met) in New York on 10 September 1984. It then travelled to Saint Louis Art Museum (February–May 1985), then to De Young Museum in San Francisco (July–September 1985), and finally to the Field Museum in Chicago (March–June 1986). The opening at the Metropolitan Museum was led by Sonny Waru, a Taranaki leader and a party of 90 elders and artists. During the tour the Māori participants connected with Indigenous First Nations communities. In San Francisco their taonga were welcomed by baskets by Pomo, Yokuts, Hupa, Yurok and Karok creators.

== Te Hokinga Mai: The return home ==
Te Māori continued once the taonga returned to New Zealand in August 1986 as Te Maori: Te Hokinga Mai ('The return home'). Starting at the National Museum of New Zealand in Wellington, it then travelled to Otago Museum in Dunedin, Robert McDougall Art Gallery in Christchurch, finishing at the Toi o Tāmaki Auckland City Art Gallery.

Te Māori: Te Hokinga Mai closed on 10 September 1987, three years to the day after opening at the Metropolitan Museum of Art in New York. A final celebration event took place in Ngāruawāhia on 12 September 1987.

== Reception ==
Te Māori was very well received, both at home and abroad. Over 600,000 visited the exhibition at its four American locations. The New Zealand institutions saw 'unprecedented' visitor numbers with 917,500 attending Te Hokinga Mai. This was estimated to represent visitation from 28% of the total New Zealand population at that time.

American press carried the messages that Māori were a living people, and that taonga held spiritual value. Judy Lessing suggested the Te Māori gave Americans a more nuanced view of New Zealand, otherwise widely known in the United States for banning of nuclear-powered vessels.

When the Te Māori cultural group performed at the American Museum of Natural History there was no doubt that it had made an impression. The audience was already won over even before the performance began. Audiences wanted to touch and experience Māori culture and to learn more.

In 1998 Amiria Salmond acknowledged the success of the exhibition for:

the beauty of the pieces on display, and for the way in which indigenous and Euro-American traditions were woven together in fertile co-operation between Maori scholar Sidney Moko Mead and curators from the Metropolitan Museum of Art in New York. The objects were treated at once as pieces of fine art, aesthetically refined and masterly in their execution, and as ancestors, material embodiments of relationships between people and the land.

— Amiria Salmond, Anthropology Today

The exhibition faced some critique, with commentary pointing out its exclusion of Māori fibre art and weaving, toi raranga. These taonga are typically produced by women, as a result the exhibition faced disapproval surrounding a lack of women artists involvement compared to the focus on carving, mostly done by men. The later 1989–1990 exhibition, Taonga Maori: Treasures of the Maori People addressed these concerns by including a more diverse range of taonga and artforms.

Further critique highlighted the argument that placing taonga in a Western 'art' context reduced or misrepresented them. American Anthropologist James Clifford suggested this was a deliberate decision by Māori to raise the international prestige of their culture and push for global recognition of New Zealand. Further questioning included Māori activist Hone Harawira, who saw Te Māori as presenting an outdated view of Māori life, too constrained to the past.

== Legacy ==
Ultimately Te Māori raised the profile of Māori culture not only in New Zealand but globally. Māori utilised this increased respect afforded to their culture to advocate for further progress and changes.

The international response to the exhibition influenced New Zealand media to pay attention to Māori art. In 1984 a Television New Zealand programme Koha – Te Māori, a Cloak of Words by Ray Waru and Ernie Leonard covered the exhibition and featured the kapa haka at the pōwhiri (opening ceremony) led by Pita Sharples. Two films on Māori art were produced in 1985: Te Māori – A Celebration of the People and their Art by Māori film maker Don Selwyn and Koha – Te Māori Guard, New York. Waru also made a film Te Māori – Te Hokinga Mai.

Museum practice changed to involve Māori in the interpretation and display of their cultural heritage. Museums began embedding a bicultural approach to 'consultation, planning, presentation' and audience engagement with taonga. The museum sector overall started to understand that taonga were more than isolated objects. This model has become an international standard of practice among museums that hold Māori and Pacific works, and has influenced institutions with holdings from other Indigenous communities to repatriate objects and interact with source communities.

More Māori started working in museums, and training in specialisations like conservation and curation. Funding for this training with the profits of the exhibition was recommended by the Te Māori management committee, who established the Te Māori Manaaki Taonga Trust for this purpose.

Mobil, who sponsored Te Māori, also sponsored the Pegasus Prize for literature to promote the works of authors from other countries which would not normally be read by American audiences. The exhibition prompted Mobil to focus on Māori authors and in 1984 a panel of New Zealand judges was set up to select a work to be put forward for the Prize. The winner of the Prize in 1985 was Keri Hulme's The Bone People.

It also influenced the new building of the national museum of New Zealand, Te Papa.

Major exhibitions influenced by Te Māori include:

- Tangata Māori (1986) – an exhibition of the human form in Māori art held at the National Art Gallery which was part of the International Festival of the Arts
- Taonga Māori (1989–1990)
- Treasures and Landmarks (1990)
- Te Waka Toi: contemporary Māori art from New Zealand (1992–1993)

10 September 2024 marked forty years since the opening of Te Māori at the Metropolitan Museum of Art in New York. In an interview reflecting on the impact of Te Maori, cultural adviser Kura Moeahu stated:

Te Māori has enabled new knowledge to evolve from out of the taonga, from ancient knowledge, and it continues to create new knowledge. That's what Te Māori has done.

— RNZ, 'Te Māori reawoke all the arts that had been hiding away quietly': Te Māori exhibition 40 years on
