= Merimeri Penfold =

New Zealand Māori educator (1920-2014)

Merimeri Penfold CNZM
- Born: 26 May 1920; Te Hāpua, New Zealand
- Died: 1 April 2014 (aged 93); Kaitaia, New Zealand

Merimeri Penfold CNZM (née Rapata, 26 May 1920 – 1 April 2014) was a New Zealand Māori educator. She is thought to have been the first Māori woman to teach Māori language at a New Zealand university.

== Biography ==
Penfold was born at Te Hāpua to Te Mutunga Rapata Hoterene and Maro Heteraka in 1920. She was a member of the Ngāti Kurī iwi. She was educated at Queen Victoria School in Auckland and Auckland Girls' Grammar School. After qualifying as a teacher, she taught at schools around the North Island before returning to university to complete a Bachelor of Arts degree.

For over 30 years Penfold lectured in Māori language at the University of Auckland and is believed to have been the first Māori woman to do so at a university in New Zealand. Her translations of nine of Shakespeare's sonnets into Māori were published in the book Nga Waiata Aroha a Hekepia in 2000. She was also a member of the editorial team for the seventh edition of Williams' Dictionary of the Maori Language, published in 1971.

Penfold served on the Māori Education Foundation and the University of Auckland's marae establishment committee. She was an executive member of the Broadcasting Commission between 1989 and 1991 and served as a Human Rights Commissioner from 2002 to 2007.

In 1999 Penfold was awarded an honorary Doctorate of Literature by the University of Auckland. In the 2001 Queen's Birthday Honours, she was appointed a Companion of the New Zealand Order of Merit, for services to Māori. She was awarded Te Tohu Aroha mō Ngoi Kumeroa Pewhairangi for her contribution to te reo Māori (the Māori language) in the 2008 Ngā Taonga Toi a Te Waka Toi – Te Waka Toi awards from Creative New Zealand.
