= Sepik Coast exchange =

Social networking in Papua New Guinea

Sepik Coast exchange is the method of social networking and alliance in the Sepik Coast area of Papua New Guinea.

Families living along the Sepik Coast in northern Papua New Guinea form alliances with families in other communities. Depending on the importance and status of the family, it can have anywhere between 5 and 75 contacts in its social network. In each surrounding town, the family knows another. When they travel to another town, they bring gifts to their contact family, and that family will house and care for them. Gifts are reciprocated when given or later when families return the visit. Common gifts are sago, tobacco, baskets, wooden bowls, and other similar items. The recipient does not specify which type of gift they would like to receive, but as a result of the vast quantity of exchanges taking place, the needs of participants are generally met.

A social field is one in which all the members have similar expectations of each other. In the social networks of the Sepik Coast, the significant expectations are hospitality, gift giving and reciprocation from friends in different villages. Alliances are passed along and preserved through many generations, because fathers bring their sons on their trips and families honor an association, no matter how long it has been since the last gift exchange.

== See also ==
- Kula ring
- Koha
- Moka
- Potlatch
- Gift Economy
- Sepik
