= Koha (custom) =

Māori custom for a gift or offering

Koha is a New Zealand Māori custom which can be translated as gift, present, offering, donation or contribution.

== Traditional usage ==
Koha is an example of the reciprocity which is a common feature of much Māori tradition, and often involves the giving of gifts by visitors (manuhiri) to a host marae. Traditionally this has often taken the form of food although taonga (treasured possessions) are also sometimes offered as koha, and in modern times money.

The koha reflects the mana of both the giver and the recipient, reflecting what the giver is able to give, and the esteem they hold of the person or group they are making the gift to – and hence plays an important part in cementing good relations, and is taken very seriously, with misunderstanding having the potential to give offence.

This traditional practice of koha remains active today in New Zealand in Māori contexts. At hui, any money given helps with the actual costs associated with the meeting, and for the benefit of non-Māori unfamiliar with the custom some marae may suggest a particular amount to be given as koha, but it remains a freely given gift rather than a charge for services or facilities.

== Wider usage ==
The term has a broader usage more closely associated with the English term donation. Participants at an event may be asked for "koha", often in the form of a request for "a gold coin donation" (i.e., $1 or $2).

In New Zealand English, it is becoming more frequent to refer to the small gifts, or more commonly food such as biscuits, desserts or cakes, which are presented when visiting friends or family as koha. Such gifts are common custom among New Zealanders, especially in rural areas. This custom, if not rooted in Māori custom (tikanga), has been reinforced by it.

The Koha Open Source library system originated in New Zealand, and takes its name from this custom.

=== Koha Shed ===
Koha Shed (noun), place of gifts, kindness, sharing and acceptance. Place of origin – Whanganui. Since 2012 a network of "Koha Sheds" have grown up to help alleviate the negative effects of poverty in local communities. The first was formed in Whanganui, New Zealand, by Sherron Sunnex and Megan Manuka. Koha Sheds make no charge for anything that is taken. Free kai (food) is always available for those in need.

=== Koha television programme ===
From 1980 to 1989 there was a weekly television programme on Television New Zealand called Koha which showed many aspects of Māori culture and history to a wide audience of Māori and non-Māori (pākehā).

== See also ==
- Potlatch, a similar practice among some First Nations peoples of west coast North America
- Kula, a similar practice in Papua New Guinea
- Moka, a similar practice in the Mt. Hagen area of Papua New Guinea
- Sepik Coast exchange, a similar practice in the Sepic Coast of Papua New Guinea
- Gift economy, a general term for societies built on practices of reciprocal giving
