= Ray Waru =

Raymond Richard Waru MNZM (born 1952) is a New Zealand Māori radio and television director and producer.

== Early life ==
Waru spent his childhood in Auckland. He was educated at St Peter's College.

== Career ==
Waru obtained positions in radio and television from the 1970s. In 1980, he headed the original Television New Zealand Māori production unit. Waru directed a broad range of Māori programmes, including the first ever full Māori language drama project, Te Ohaki a Nihe, and Te Māori, A Cloak of Words and Te Māori - Te Hokinga Mai on the Te Māori exhibition.

In the 1980s Waru produced and directed a revolutionary documentary series, The Natural World of the Māori, various film and television productions in New Zealand and in Australia, as well as an IMAX production under the East-West Center in Hawaii. In the 1980s he was appointed as chief executive of the Aotearoa Māori Radio Trust, charged with the development of a national Māori radio system.

In the 1990s Waru was co-producer of the major history series, Our People, Our Century, a winner at the 2000 New Zealand Film and TV Awards, and he produced Toro Mai, a 25-part serial drama in te reo.

In 2005 Waru co-produced the New Zealand historical series, Frontier of Dreams, The Story of New Zealand

In the 2006 Queen's Birthday Honours, Waru was appointed a Member of the New Zealand Order of Merit, for services to radio and television.

In 2012 Waru published "Secrets & Treasures" which consists of "stories told through the objects at Archives New Zealand" and which "delves into the archives to tell a very human story of New Zealand, a story that involves love, death, war, immigration, disaster, protest, defiance, censorship and hokey pokey".
