= Waikawau =

Settlement in Waitomo District, New Zealand

- Locality
- Interactive map of Waikawau
- Coordinates: 38.472°S 174.681°E
- Country: New Zealand
- Region: Waikato region
- Territorial authority: Waitomo District
- Ward: Rural
- Electorates: Taranaki-King Country; Te Tai Hauāuru (Māori)

Government
  - Territorial Authority: Waitomo District Council
  - Regional council: Waikato Regional Council
  - Mayor of Waitomo: John Robertson
  - Taranaki-King Country MP: Barbara Kuriger
  - Hauraki-Waikato MP: Hana-Rawhiti Maipi-Clarke

Population (2023 census)
  - Territorial: 51
- Time zone: UTC+12 (NZST)
  - Summer (DST): UTC+13 (NZDT)

Waikawau is a rural community in the Waitomo District and Waikato region of New Zealand's North Island, beside Waikawau River.

There are also small settlements of the same name on both the west and east coasts of Coromandel.

It features the only publicly accessible beach between Marokopa and Awakino. The only way to access the beach is through a walking track and farming tunnel, which was dug through sandstone cliffs by three men in 1911.

The New Zealand Ministry for Culture and Heritage gives a translation of "water of the shag" for Waikawau.

The area has been a popular spot for freedom camping during whitebait season and summer. Signs were put in place in 2015, advising visitors it is illegal to camp on private land.

The New Zealand endemic plant, Dracophyllum strictum, grows extensively in the area.

== Demographics ==
Waikawau is astride meshblocks 1016301 and 1016400, which had a population of 51 people in the 2023 census.

The Awakino-Waikawau locality covers 286.22 km^{2} (110.51 sq mi) and is covered at Awakino#Demographics. The locality is part of the larger Herangi statistical area.

== Education ==
Whareorino School is a co-educational state primary school covering years 1 to 8, with a roll of 8 as of July 2026. The school was open by 1930.
