= Māhoenui =

- Village
- Interactive map of Māhoenui
- Country: New Zealand
- Region: Waikato region
- Territorial authority: Waitomo District
- Ward: Rural
- Electorates: Taranaki-King Country; Te Tai Hauāuru (Māori)

Government
  - Territorial Authority: Waitomo District Council
  - Regional council: Waikato Regional Council
  - Mayor of Waitomo: John Robertson
  - Taranaki-King Country MP: Barbara Kuriger
  - Hauraki-Waikato MP: Hana-Rawhiti Maipi-Clarke

Population (2023 census)
  - Territorial: 72
- Time zone: UTC+12 (NZST)
  - Summer (DST): UTC+13 (NZDT)

Māhoenui is a small community in the western North Island of New Zealand, on the Awakino River, near Piopio and Te Kūiti.

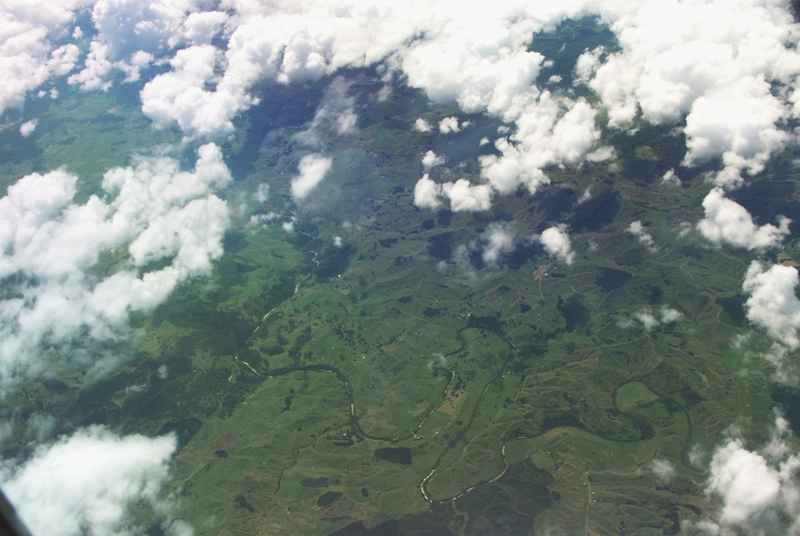
King Country farms from the air

The name refers to 'large māhoe trees' which used to grow in the area. A macron was added to the name in 2022 as part of the Maniapoto Claims Settlement Act.

== History ==
The Croall family lived on the Awakino River in the 1920s and 1930s, eventually having to leave the land as uneconomic to survive by traditional farming methods. Charles Croall, sr., relocated to Hamilton, setting up a construction business (Croall Construction) to build houses en-masse for the government. These subdivisions became known as 'State house areas' and were typically inhabited by lower socio-economic communities. Large numbers of those houses have been sold to private buyers, both individually and in bulk.

Lewis Robert Ridling (commonly known as Bob) and his wife Margaret Marina Ridling née Jackson along with their 5 sons and 3 daughters cleared the land by hand of scrub and bush in this area. The Ridlings worked their Māhoenui farm from the 1920s onward after Bob Ridling won the land in a returned veterans ballot after returning wounded from Gallipoli, Turkey from World War I. Many ex servicemen simply walked off the land due to the difficulty of turning it into viable farm land. The Moss's were also well known in the area as Mr Moss was the local school teacher in the 1930s.

== Demographics ==
Māhoenui is in meshblocks 1016005, 1016101-2, and 1016203-4, which had a population of 72 people in the 2023 census.

The community straddles Herangi and Aria statistical areas.

== Education ==
Māhoenui primary school opened in 1898 and closed in 2006 due to lack of students, with the property now privately owned.

== Geography ==
Māhoenui is located in the King Country approx 50 kilometres (31 mi) inland from the west coast of the North Island, the topography is hilly to mountainous, with small alluvial areas near the streams and river.

== Economics ==
The primary activity is sheep farming, with beef and dairy farming to a lesser degree.
