= Herangi Range =

Range of hills in Waikato Region, New Zealand

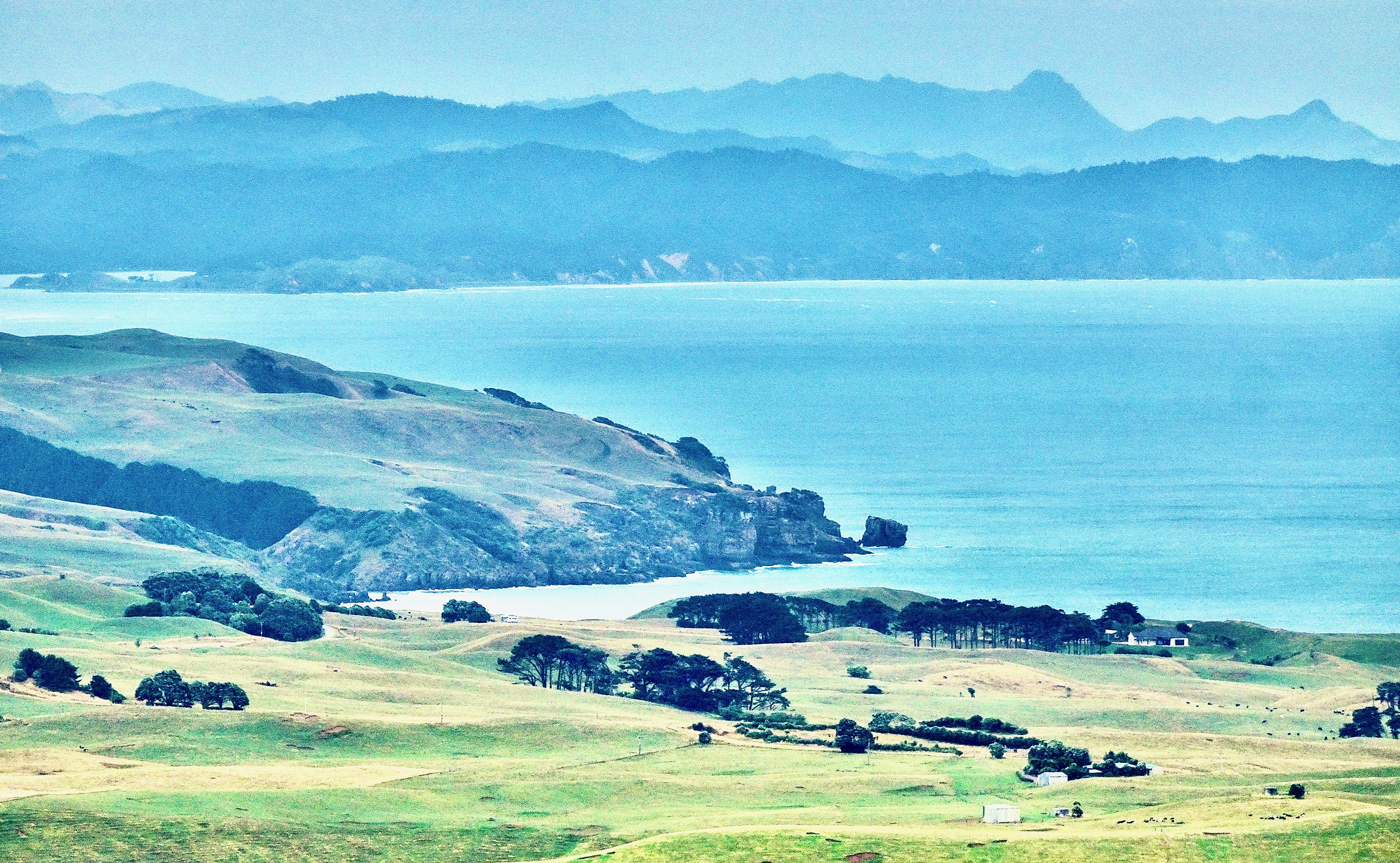
- The north end of the Herangi Range viewed from Karioi; Taranaki Point in the near distance

Highest point
- Elevation: 806 m (2,644 ft)
- Coordinates: 38.5°S 174.76°E

Geography
- Location within New Zealand
- Location: Waikato, New Zealand

Herangi Range is a range of hills south of Marokopa and north of Awakino, in the Waikato region of New Zealand, reaching to the Tasman Sea at Tapirimoko, Tirua, Taungaururoa, Te Mauku and Ngarupupu Points. Just to the south of Ngarupupu, the Waikawau River enters the sea. Other rivers draining the range are Mangaotaki River, Awakino River and Manganui River. Herangi is part of the Whareorino conservation area.

Herangi is in the Maniapoto rohe. Pā and other archaeological sites are found close together along the coast, but very few in the range itself. The Kiritehere valley was settled in the 1900s, but much of the rest of the range is in Whareorino Conservation Area, of particular importance for its native frogs.

A Reims Cessna F152 II crashed into a tree on a ridge between Whareorino (649 m (2,129 ft)) and Mangatoa Saddle on 21 July 2009. The pilot, who died, was inexperienced and had not complied with requirements to calculate a route allowing for the poor weather.

== Geography ==
The main peaks from north to south are Maungamangero 806 m (2,644 ft), Te Heruera 756 m (2,480 ft), Maugatewharau 795 m (2,608 ft), Te Whakapatiki 766 m (2,513 ft) and Herangi 725 m (2,379 ft).

Mangatoa and Manganui Roads follow a north–south route through the ranges, running from Marokopa, 56 km (35 mi) south, via Kiritehere, Moeatoa, rising over the 311 m (1,020 ft) Mangatoa Saddle, Waikawau and a lower 230 m (750 ft) saddle to follow the Manganui valley through to Awakino. The road was built about 1935, when the last surfboats plied wool to the Holm & Co vessel, Parera, off the beach at Nukuhakari. Prior to that, even travel on horseback was difficult.

Mt Duthie, 372 m (1,220 ft), gets about 2 m (6 ft 7 in) of rain a year. It and 332 m (1,089 ft) Mt Brookes were named after the surveyors who mapped them, F Duthie and Edwin Stanley Brookes Jnr.

=== Piritoki Reef ===
Piritoki Reef lies about 1 km (0.62 mi) north of Tirua Point. Its sharp rocks create an area of turbulent sea. They rise to about a metre above sea level. The Northern Steamship Company's 307 ton Kia Ora foundered on the reef in fog on 13 June 1907, with the loss of 3 lives. The Chief Officer was blamed, with a suspicion of being inebriated, but his suspended certificate was returned within a few months.

=== Tirua Point ===
Tirua Point has cliffs on the north side of the Point rising to over 100 m (330 ft). In the 1860s it was thought the country was at its 198 mi (319 km) widest between Tolaga Bay and Tirua Point. The 1:50,000 map shows the easting of the northern headland of Ngararahae Bay, just south of Tirua Point as 1742785, and Marau Point, on the north side of Kaiaua Bay, on same latitude on the east coast, as 2068929 the difference being just over 326 km (203 mi).

Tirua Point is on Nukuhakari Station, where grazing increased the advance of dunes in both Nukuhakari and Ngararahae Bays. Thousands of spinifex, planted in 2015, 2016 and 2017, have reduced sand movement.

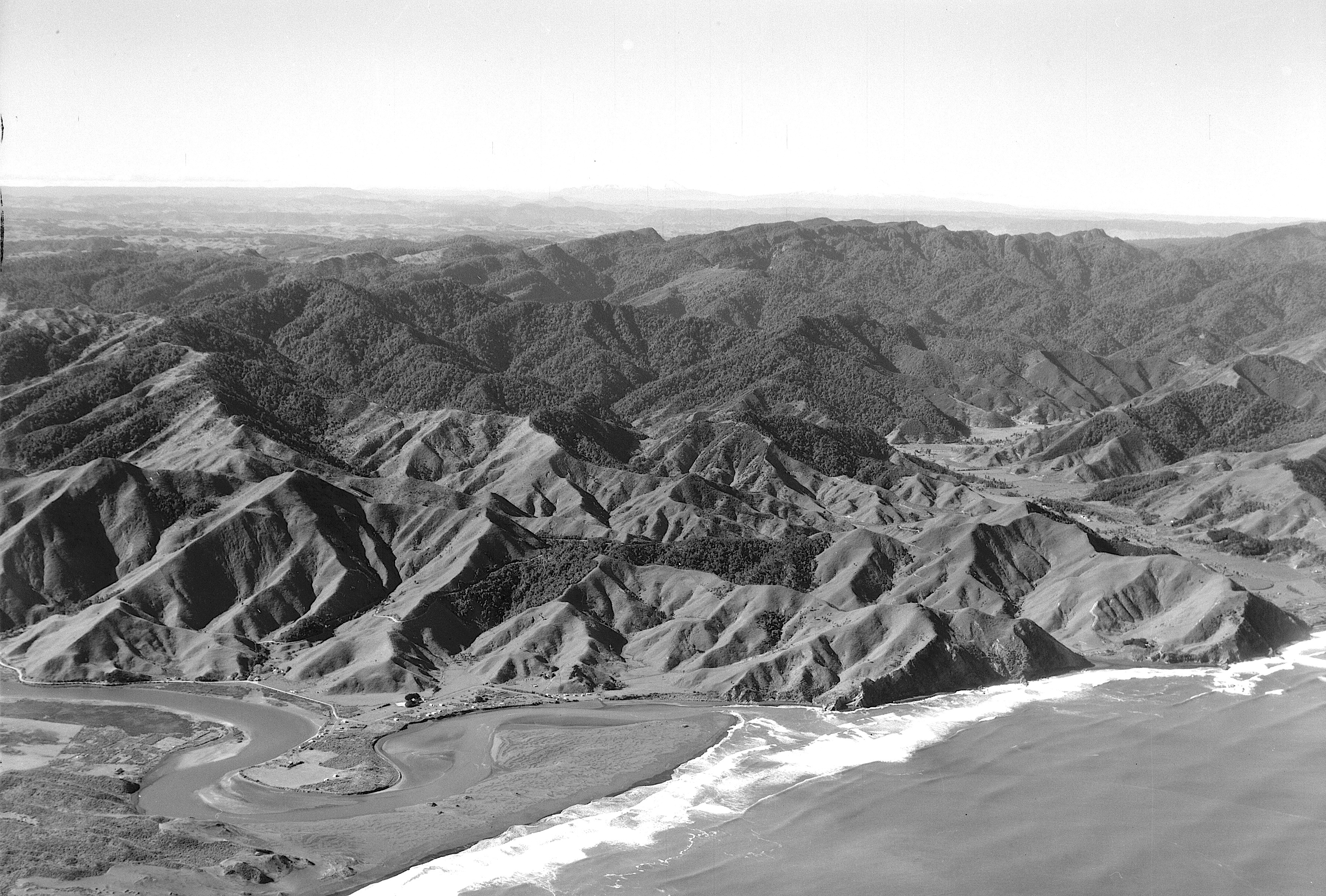
Marokopa in the foreground, Kiritehere valley beyond and Temaikan sandstone cliffs of Maungamangero in the mid distance centre

=== Geology ===
Herangi is part of the roughly north - south Kāwhia Syncline, Triassic Newcastle Group form the west side of the range, with sandstones, siltstones and greywacke folded, faulted and covered by Middle Jurassic Rengarenga carbonaceous sandstone and other sedimentary rocks. The main rivers flow across broad alluvial floodplains, from which the hills of Mesozoic rock rise sharply. Steep homoclinal ridges and hogbacks are prominent, with dip slopes often underlain by more resistant sandstone. The coast has near-vertical cliffs, generally behind an ironsand beach.

=== Tracks ===
Currently 4 tracks offer alternative routes to Leitch's Hut, which has 16 bunk beds, heating, mattresses, non-flush toilets, untreated tap water and no booking system. Sam Leitch was awarded the area in a World War I soldiers' land ballot. His home was in the clearing where the hut is and his plantings of macrocapa and eleagnus remain. The tracks are classed as Advanced Tramping tracks, in the more difficult 5th level, as defined in DoC's 6 levels of walking track categories. The exception is Leitch's Track, which is a level easier, as an Intermediate: Easier tramping track.

Leitch's Track is over 8.5 km (5.3 mi). It starts at the end of Leitch Road, on a well graded road, then passes farmland and climbs into bush, before descending to Leitch's clearing, with no major streams to cross.

Mahoenui Track follows the Awakino River for 12 km (7.5 mi). It is closed from 1 September to 10 October each year for lambing. It starts at the end of Gribbon Road and crosses the river near the hut, but is not passable after heavy rain.

Mangatoa Track crosses the Herangi Range for 8 km (5.0 mi), starting at the Mangatoa Road saddle and gradually climbing to the Herangi Ridge, before turning right, down to the Waikawau Track junction and Leitch's Hut. It too is not passable after heavy rain.

Waikawau Track is the longest, 14 km (8.7 mi), overgrown and unmarked in places, with windfalls, slips and flooding after heavy rain. It starts on Crawford Road on the north bank of the Waikawau River, near Waikawau, follows the river, then Mangapapa Stream to Waikawau Saddle and then drops to Leitch's Clearing and crosses the Awakino River to the hut.

== Wildlife ==
The Herangi Range is part of Whareorino Conservation Area. It has a moist climate, with rainfall of 1.6 to 2.50m a year. The ridges are covered by a sub-alpine vegetation of low scrub and kaikawaka along with neinei, pepperwood and divaricating shrubs interspersed with areas of cushion bog. At lower levels kohekohe is abundant on lower slopes facing the sea, but tawa is dominant inland, giving way to tawheowheo scrub at higher levels. Birds include karearea, many forest birds and, in 1987, there were occasional sightings of kākā and kōkako. Hochstetter's frog lives by most of the streams. Archey's frog is found in moist, medium to high-altitude forest. Herangi and Coromandel Ranges are the only places where natural remnants of these critically endangered frogs live. Some tracks have been closed to prevent the spread of chytrid fungus to Archey's frogs. The Native Forests Restoration Trust's 645 ha (1,590 acres) Steuart Russell Reserve has a sizeable North Island brown kiwi population and is the most northerly forest where hard beech dominates. Uncommon Brachyglottis kirkii, white rātā, climbing rātā, akatea, northern rātā, rōhutu, shrub panax and the orchids, Caladenia bartlettii and Corybas rivularis, were recorded on Maungamangero in 1983.

== Pests ==
Marokopa was one of many areas around the country where acclimatisation societies introduced possums in the 1920s. DoC and Regional Council have a programme to control goats and possums in Herangi.
