= Awakino =

- Village
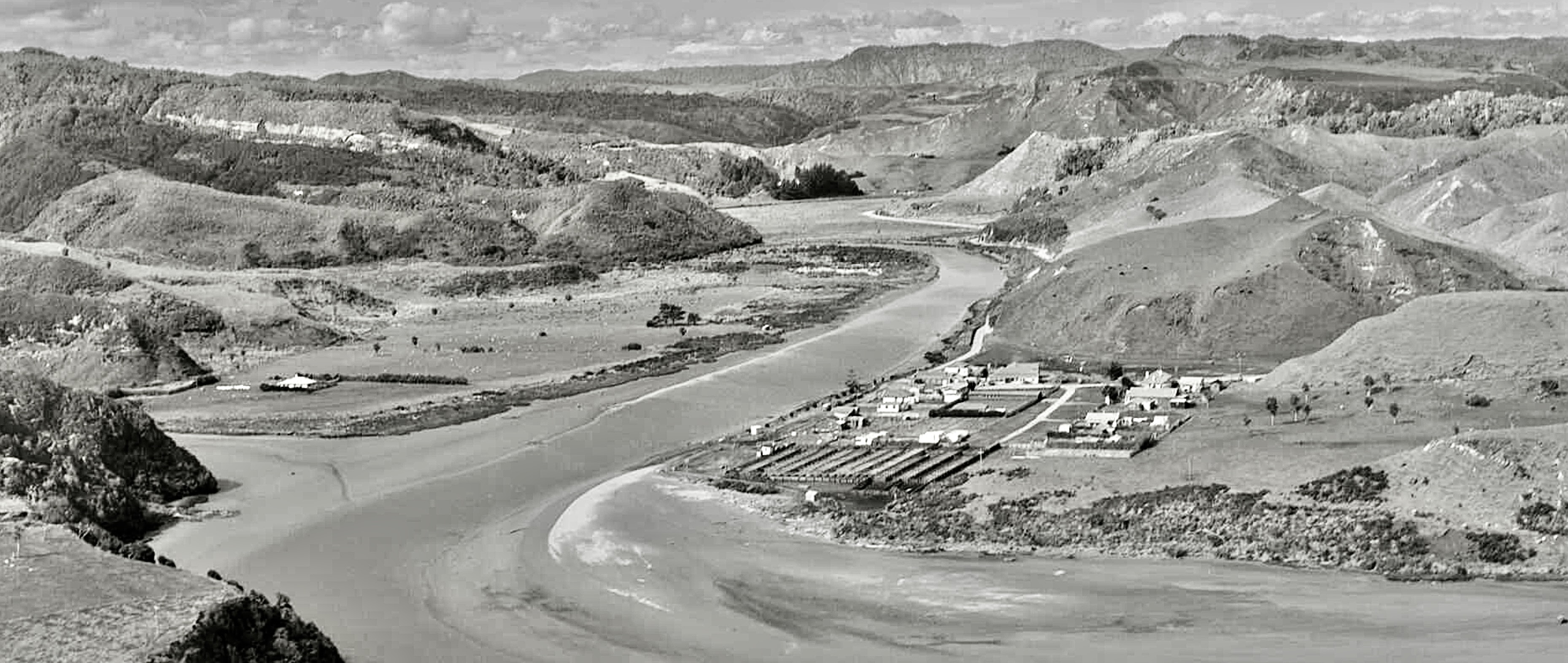
- Awakino in 1951
- Interactive map of Awakino
- Coordinates: 38°39′S 174°38′E
- Country: New Zealand
- Region: Waikato region
- Territorial authority: Waitomo District
- Ward: Rural
- Electorates: Taranaki-King Country; Te Tai Hauāuru (Māori)

Government
  - Territorial Authority: Waitomo District Council
  - Regional council: Waikato Regional Council
  - Mayor of Waitomo: John Robertson
  - Taranaki-King Country MP: Barbara Kuriger
  - Hauraki-Waikato MP: Hana-Rawhiti Maipi-Clarke

Population (2023 census)
  - Territorial: 69
- Time zone: UTC+12 (NZST)
  - Summer (DST): UTC+13 (NZDT)

Awakino is a settlement in the south of Waitomo District, in the North Island of New Zealand. It is located on State Highway 3 at the mouth of the Awakino River, five kilometres north of Mōkau. It is 79 km southwest of Te Kūiti, and 98 km northeast of New Plymouth.

North of Awakino, State Highway 3 turns inland, and the coast is largely unpopulated. Beyond Awakino there are no settlements of any size on the coast south of the Kawhia Harbour.

The New Zealand Ministry for Culture and Heritage gives a translation of "bad creek" for Awakino.

The local Maniaroa Marae and meeting house are affiliated with the Ngāti Maniapoto hapū of Ngāti Rākei, Rungaterangi and Waiora.

== Demographics ==
Awakino settlement is in meshblocks 1016500 and 1016900, which had a population of 69 people in the 2023 census.

The Awakino-Waikawau locality covers 286.22 km^{2} (110.51 sq mi). The locality is part of the larger Herangi statistical area.

Historical population for Awakino-Waikawau
Year	Pop.	±% p.a.
2006	189	—
2013	132	−5.00%
2018	117	−2.38%
2023	144	+4.24%

Awakino-Waikawau had a population of 144 in the 2023 New Zealand census, an increase of 27 people (23.1%) since the 2018 census, and an increase of 12 people (9.1%) since the 2013 census. There were 75 males and 69 females in 66 dwellings. The median age was 49.5 years (compared with 38.1 years nationally). There were 30 people (20.8%) aged under 15 years, 12 (8.3%) aged 15 to 29, 69 (47.9%) aged 30 to 64, and 30 (20.8%) aged 65 or older.

People could identify as more than one ethnicity. The results were 89.6% European (Pākehā), 35.4% Māori, and 4.2% other, which includes people giving their ethnicity as "New Zealander". English was spoken by 97.9%, Māori by 6.2%, and other languages by 2.1%. No language could be spoken by 2.1% (e.g. too young to talk). New Zealand Sign Language was known by 2.1%. The percentage of people born overseas was 6.2, compared with 28.8% nationally.

Religious affiliations were 37.5% Christian, 2.1% Māori religious beliefs, and 2.1% New Age. People who answered that they had no religion were 52.1%, and 10.4% of people did not answer the census question.

Of those at least 15 years old, 12 (10.5%) people had a bachelor's or higher degree, 63 (55.3%) had a post-high school certificate or diploma, and 36 (31.6%) people exclusively held high school qualifications. The median income was $29,400, compared with $41,500 nationally. The employment status of those at least 15 was 48 (42.1%) full-time and 18 (15.8%) part-time.

== Awakino County Council ==
In 1903 Awakino County was formed by splitting the former Kawhia County, but no council was formed for Awakino for another decade. Awakino County extended along the coast from Awakino to Marokopa and was bounded to the north by Kawhia County, to the east by Waitomo County and to the south by Clifton County. In 1919 the county population was estimated to be 801. At least the first five meetings, from its formation at Awakino on Saturday 22 March 1913, were held on a Saturday close to full moon. In 1915 the County changed its meeting place from Waitanguru to Piopio, where its last meeting was held on Saturday 20 May 1922, after which Awakino merged into Waitomo County Council, though Marokopa became a new riding of Kawhia County, under the Waikato and King Country Counties Act 1922.

== Education ==
Awakino School opened in 1906 and closed in 1996.
