= Mangaotaki River =

Coordinates: 38.550860°S 174.913226°E

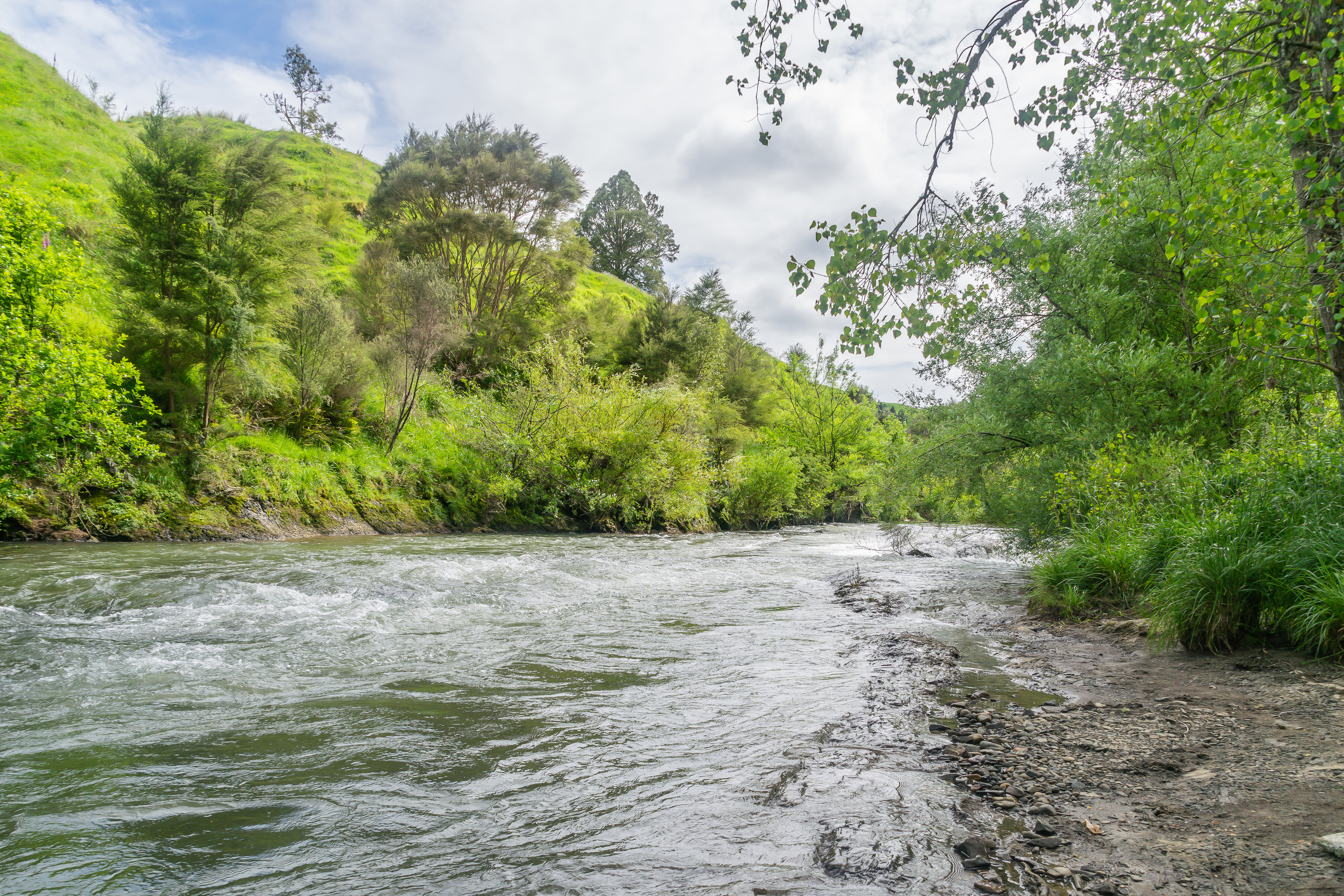

Location
- Country: New Zealand

Physical characteristics
- Source
  - location: Herangi Range
- Mouth
  - location: Mokau River
- Length: 27 km (17 mi)

The Mangaotaki River is a river of the southern Waikato region of New Zealand's North Island. It flows generally southeast from its sources in the coastal Herangi Range to reach the Mokau River 15 kilometres (9 mi) southwest of Piopio.

About 4 km (2 mi) above its confluence with the Mokau the river is bridged by SH3. The river at that point is too polluted for swimming.

One of its upper tributaries is the Waitanguru Stream, which has Waitanguru Falls on it.

The New Zealand Ministry for Culture and Heritage gives a translation of "stream of oratory" for Mangaotaki.

== See also ==
- List of rivers of New Zealand
