= State Highway 4 (New Zealand) =

Road in New Zealand

State Highway 4

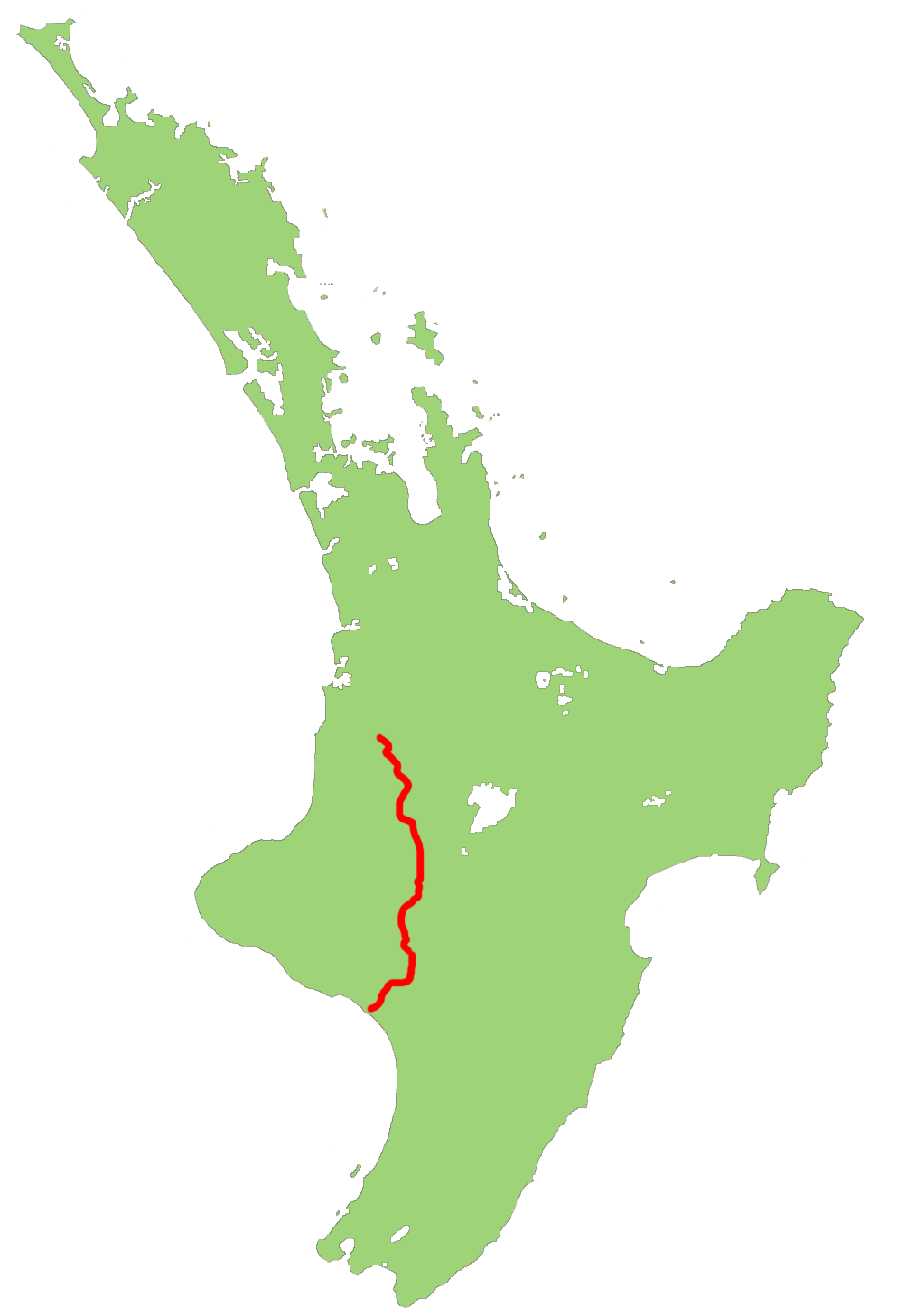

Route information
- Maintained by NZ Transport Agency Waka Kotahi
- Length: 237 km (147 mi)

Major junctions
- North end: SH 3 at Eight Mile Junction (11 km (6.8 mi) south of Te Kūiti)
- South end: SH 3 at Whanganui

Location
- Country: New Zealand
- Primary destinations: Taumarunui, National Park, Raetihi

Highway system
- New Zealand state highways; Motorways and expressways; List
← SH 3	→ SH 5

State Highway 4 is the shortest of New Zealand's eight national highways. It runs north-south across rugged hill country, forming a short cut between two points on State Highway 3 thereby avoiding Taranaki and the coasts of the North and South Taranaki Bights. Distances are measured from north to south.

For most of its length SH4 is a two-lane single carriageway, with at-grade intersections and property accesses, both in rural and urban areas. The NZ Transport Agency (NZTA) classifies SH 4 as a primary collector road, except between National Park (SH 47) and Tohunga Junction (SH 49) where it is classified an arterial road.

== Route ==
The highway commences from a junction on SH 3 11 km south of Te Kūiti. It heads south-southeast, climbing initially, then descending along the winding valleys of the Ōhura and Ongarue Rivers, two tributaries of the Whanganui. The Ongarue joins the Whanganui close to Taumarunui, and here the highway turns east briefly, ascending the Whanganui's valley before turning south to skirt the North Island Volcanic Plateau. The peaks of the plateau's volcanoes are clearly visible from the highway, especially that of the southernmost, Ruapehu.

At Horopito the highway veers southwest briefly, following a tributary of the Mangawhero River until it joins with this river near Raetihi. The highway continues to descend the Mangawhero's valley to within 40 km of its mouth, then heads west across rolling hill country to the valley of the Whanganui River, which it follows for the last 15 km of its journey into Whanganui.

== Major junctions ==
Territorial authority	Location	km	mi	Destinations	Notes
Waitomo District	Eight Mile Junction	0	0.0	SH 3 north – Hamilton; SH 3 south – New Plymouth	SH 4 begins
Ruapehu District	Taumarunui	70	43	SH 43 (Kururau Road) – Stratford	
Ruapehu District	Manunui	77	48	SH 41 – Tūrangi	
Ruapehu District	National Park	114	71	SH 47 – Tūrangi	
Ruapehu District	Tohunga Junction	140	87	SH 49 – Ohakune, Waiouru	
Whanganui District	Putiki	237	147	SH 3 north – Whanganui, New Plymouth; SH 3 south – Palmerston North	SH 4 ends
