= Wairere Power Station =

- Location within New Zealand
- Country: New Zealand
- Location: Aria Road, Piopio, Waikato
- Coordinates: 38°31′54″S 175°00′30″E
- Purpose: Power
- Status: Operational
- Construction began: 1924
- Opening date: 1926
- Owners: Wairere Electric Power Board (1924-1978); Waitomo Electric Power Board (1978-1992); Waitomo Energy Services (1993-1999); King Country Energy (1999-present day)
- Operator: Trustpower

Dam and spillways
- Type of dam: Earth
- Impounds: Mokau River
- Height (thalweg): 3.5 m

Reservoir
- Surface area: 2 ha

Power Station
- Operator: Trustpower
- Commission date: December 1925
- Type: Conventional
- Hydraulic head: 19.6 m
- Turbines: Two
- Installed capacity: 4.6 MW (6,200 hp)
- Annual generation: 17 GWh (61 TJ)
- Website; King Country Energy

The Wairere Power Station is a hydroelectric power facility in the Waikato region in New Zealand which makes use of water from the Mokau River. Water is drawn from behind a dam above the Wairere Falls, which diverts the water through two penstocks to the Wairere Power Station, before being discharged back into the Mokau River. The station was commissioned in 1925 with the first generating unit. Three more generating units were added between 1938 and 1981 before a major refurbishment resulted in three of the units being replaced by a single generating unit in 2013-2014.

== History ==
=== Development ===
After being hired in 1903 by the Public Works Minister William Hall-Jones to investigate the hydro-electric potential of New Zealand, American electrical engineer L. M. Hancock identified 41 locations in 1904. Wairere Falls was ranked number 27. Lawrence Birks had become the chief electrical engineer of the Public Works Department (PWD) in 1919 was familiar with the falls and was able to convince a number of residents of Aria and Piopio that the Mokau River and Wairere Falls should be developed.

As a result, in November 1919 a group of citizens in Aria and Piopio formed a committee to undertake the work. They engaged experienced engineer Henry "Harry" Richmond Climie (1884-1961) of consulting engineers H.W. Clime & Son to undertake an investigation which he reported on at two meetings that were held recently at Piopio and Aria respectively. Climie estimated that a turbine capacity of 125 hp would be ample to supply present requirements within a 10 mi (16.09 km) radius of the proposed power station and that double this amount would meet the demand for many years, provided no large industry such as a freezing or lime works required a supply. He estimated that the location had a potential total capacity of 1,500 hp

As work progressed the committee were invited by an offer in August 1922 to amalgamate their efforts with the new created Te Kuiti provisional power board. Wishing to maintain their independence and aware that they were remote from Te Kuiti they decided to continue on their own. Despite the withdraw of some of the potential customers who had initially expressed their support the Wairere Electric Power Board was established in January 1923.

The new board's first official meeting was in Piopio in May 1923, which Harry Climie attended. He was subsequently engaged to design the power station and the associated distribution system.

Climie submitted his design within several weeks. Following acceptance, the board began the process of obtaining the required water, power and distribution licences, as well as polling the ratepayers in their area to raise a loan to pay for the works. Climie had estimated that the construction of the power station and associated distribution network would cost £38,500 plus an additional amount to pay for the first three years of operation until sufficient customers could be connected. Unfortunately no one was prepared to provide the money. With the assistance of their local MP the board was able to obtain enough funds to commence construction of the power station. It was several more months before a loan for the full amount was able to be obtained.

=== Construction ===
Construction of the power station was undertaken by a workforce under the control of the board’s engineer, F. Harvey.

=== Commissioning ===
The power station commenced commercial generation in December 1925, with 80 customers receiving a supply in Aria and Piopio and surrounding districts by January 1926.

The new power station was officially opened on 27 May 1926 by Prime Minister Gordon Coates with a single generating unit (G1) which had a Boving & Co horizontal Francis turbine driving a ASEA generator which gave an original installed capacity of 480 kW, which was generated at 6.6 kV. The generating unit was supplied with water via a concrete and steel 1.15 m (3.8 ft) diameter, 43 m (141 ft) long penstock with a capacity of up to 3.1 cumecs.

By 1936 the Wairere Power Board had an annual revenue of £5,000, with the power station supplying about 350 consumers via approximately 120 miles of transmission line.

On 9 January 1936 while in the process of assisting in installing a new and more efficient stator on the generating unit Francis Rosengrave Harvey, an engineer employed by the Wairere Power Board was electrocuted and killed at the power station when a ruler with which he was taking measurements, came into contact with live equipment.

=== Installation of G3 ===
In September 1937 the board gave approval for its consulting engineer Lloyd Mandeno to purchase a second machine.

In 1938 the powerhouse was extended which allowed an additional 240 kW machine (G2) with a Boving & Co horizontal Francis turbine driving a ASEA generator to be installed which increased the total installed capacity to 624 kW. This generating unit was supplied via a dual end concrete 2.6 m (8.5 ft) diameter, 35 m (115 ft) long penstock with a capacity of up to 7.1 cumecs to G2.

Eels were initially a problem at the power station, which was solved in 1939 by suspending an electrified rod in the surge chamber.

Following a period of dry weather which reduced the station's output and faced with increasing demand the board installed a second hand 200 kW diesel generator at the power station to supplement the station's output.

The commissioning of the second generating unit (G2) allowed essential loads to be supplied while G1 to be taken out of service and overhauled after having been in practically continuous operation since its installation. Taken out of service on the evening of 20 June 1939, G1 was dismantled overnight, transported up the hill from the power-house, from where all parts requiring repair were transported to Hamilton, where for the next two days it was refurbished and by the midnight on the following Tuesday last the machinery was returned to the power station and returned to service in time to carry the evening load on Thursday. While this repair was being carried out opportunity was taken install a new and more efficient stainless-steel runner, a rubber-lined submerged bearing was installed in place of the old oil circulation bearing, and improvements made to the lubrication system. These improvements lead to a 12 per cent, increase in output. To impound more water a weir was built across the head of the falls and flashboards installed to raise the river level. The tailrace was deepened in order to utilise all of the available head, while the riverbed downstream from the power station was blasted to remove the rock bars which have impeded the flow of the stream below the station.

Associated with the expansion of the power station the capacity of the transmission line which conveyed power from the power station to Piopio was doubled to cope with the heavy increase in consumption in this part of the Board's district.

Following the death of the power station's operator in October 1942 the offer of his widow Isobel Gibbs to undertake his duties as a contribution to the war effort was accepted at a salary of £4 10 shillings, which was 25% less than her late husbands. She worked seven days a week from 6 am to 10 pm. Following the end of the Second World War the board hired Lloyd Mandeno to about improving the power station and its connection to the system. He recommended that the board build a tie-line to connect the power station's output to the State Hydro-Electric Department's (SHD) system which would allow the board to supply its customers when the station was unable to supply all of its load as well as allowing them during periods of low load to sell any surplus generation from Wairere to the SHD. A condition of the connection to the SHD system was that the power station had to be staffed 24 hours a day, which led to a second operator joining Mrs Gibbs at the power station. Upon her resignation in 1952 the board paid her a gift of £20.

=== Installation of G3 ===
In August 1952 a major upgrade of the power station was completed which included the installation of an additional generating unit (G3) which had a horizontal Francis turbine driving a 825 kW Lancashire Dynamo & Crypto generator.

Following discussions that had been going on intermittently since the early 1930s the Wairere Electric Power Board merged with the Waitomo Electric Power Board in 1978 and took its name.

=== Installation of G4 ===
Between 1978 and 1981 the Wairere Power Station was upgraded at a cost of NZ$2 million and a new machine (G4) was added in 1981 which improved efficiency and maximized the use of the river flow.

In response to the introduction of the Energy Companies Act in 1992, the Waitomo Electric Power Board changed its financial structure to become Waitomo Energy Services Ltd.

In 1998 the New Zealand Government passed the Electricity Industry Reform Act which was intended to change the structure of the electricity industry to encourage competition. This Act required the operational separation of lines and generation business activities by 1 July 1999 and separation of the ownership by 1 January 2004. To lead after a period of consultation to King Country Energy on 1 April 1999 purchasing the generation and retail assets of Waitomo Energy Services while the later company purchased the network assets of King Country Energy and changed its name to "The Lines Company". As a result in 1999 Wairere became owned by King Country Energy.

In 2005 upstream and downstream fish passages were commissioned with a monitoring programme which includes maintaining video footage. During the summer period of 2009 it was estimated that 1000 eels migrated downstream through the fish passage while approximately 160 kg (350 lb) of juvenile eels (elvers) had moved upstream.

Installation of a tipping gate which would minimize upstream impacts in low to medium flood events was completed in 2006.

In 2009 G4 was overhauled and fitted with replacement runner blades.

=== Installation of G5 ===
In 2010 the company reviewed the operation of Wairere and identified the option of either overhauling the three old units or install a single new one. At the time the station was generating a combined mean output of 18 GWh a year. The company opted for the latter and in December 2013 decommissioned units 1, 2 and 3 and replaced them with a single new generating unit, G5. The commissioning of the new generating unit in June 2014, lead to a five per cent improvement in efficiency compared to what the older three units produced altogether.

As well as the installation of a new penstock, draft tube, main inlet valve, turbine, and generator, two of the existing turbines and associated draft tubes were removed. At the same time the powerhouse was seismically strengthened and the existing tailrace lowered by 0.5 m (1.6 ft).

In 2015 Trustpower became a majority shareholder of King Country Energy, which lead in 2017 to Trustpower taking over operation of all of KCE’s power stations following the signing of an operation and maintenance contract with KCE.

== Design ==
Water is impounded by a 3.5 m (11 ft) high concrete dam with a spillway flap gate, that can discharge up to 110 cumecs in normal conditions and up to 320 cumecs in a flood.

There are two sets of intakes both fitted with an automatic screen cleaner and hydraulic gate. The original intake which supplied G1 is now decommissioned.

From each intake a single penstock transports the water to respectively the powerhouse, which was built in the late 1980s to house machine G4 and to a second powerhouse containing machine G5 which was commissioned in 2014. The penstock that supplies G4 has a capacity of 17.55 cumecs, is of concrete construction, has a diameter of 2.6 m (8.5 ft) and is 50.3 m (165 ft) in length.

Generating unit G4 which was installed in 1989 consists of a Kaplan turbine driving a Parsons Peebles 3 MW generator. Generating unit G5 which was installed in 2014 consists of a Turab 1.12 m dia horizontal Francis turbine driving a 1.2 MW generator.

The power station is embedded within The Lines Company network behind Transpower's Hangitaki Substation, but can also be switched within The Lines Company network to support Transpower's Whakamaru substation on a limited supply basis.

== Operation ==
Operation of the power station is covered by the requirements of three resource consents which expire in December 2032.

== See also ==
- Hydroelectric power in New Zealand
