= Manganui River (Waikato) =

Coordinates: 38.662067°S 174.656994°E

Location
- Country: New Zealand

Physical characteristics
- Source
  - location: Herangi Range
- Mouth
  - location: Awakino River
- Length: 20 km (12 mi)

Waikato's Manganui River is located close to the west coast of New Zealand's North Island. It flows south, parallel to the coast of the North Taranaki Bight, before flowing into the Awakino River 5 kilometres (3 mi) from the latter's mouth.

== See also ==
- List of rivers of New Zealand
