= Mimi River (New Zealand) =

Coordinates: 38°58′S 174°26′E

Location
- Country: New Zealand

Physical characteristics
- Mouth
  - location: North Taranaki Bight
- Length: 22 km (14 mi)

The Mimi River is a river of the Taranaki Region of New Zealand's North Island. It flows generally southwest from its sources in rough hill country 25 kilometres northeast of Urenui to reach the sea five kilometres northeast of the town. State Highway 3 follows the valley of the Mimi River for part of its length.

== See also ==
- List of rivers of New Zealand
