= Āria =

Settlement in Waikato, New Zealand

- Village
- Interactive map of Āria
- Coordinates: 38°33′41″S 174°59′07″E
- Country: New Zealand
- Region: Waikato region
- District: Waitomo District
- Ward: Waitomo Rural Ward
- Electorates: Taranaki-King Country; Te Tai Hauāuru (Māori)

Government
  - Territorial Authority: Waitomo District Council
  - Regional council: Waikato Regional Council
  - Mayor of Waitomo: John Robertson
  - Taranaki-King Country MP: Barbara Kuriger
  - Hauraki-Waikato MP: Hana-Rawhiti Maipi-Clarke

Area
  - Territorial: 204.83 km^{2} (79.09 sq mi)

Population (2023 census)
  - Territorial: 240
  - Density: 1.2/km^{2} (3.0/sq mi)
- Time zone: UTC+12 (NZST)
  - Summer (DST): UTC+13 (NZDT)

Āria is a rural community in the Waitomo District and Waikato region of New Zealand's North Island.

The area experienced severe flooding in September 2017.

== History ==
Āria began in 1904, when some 30 blocks of around 200 acres (81 ha) were given under the Homestead Acts. Four small mines produced 53,000 tons from Aria coalfield between 1917 and 1961. To the east of Āria a lime quarry opened in the 1960s. A new post office opened in 1922 and there was a butter factory from about 1911.

== Demographics ==
Āria locality covers 204.83 km^{2} (79.09 sq mi). It is part of the larger Aria statistical area.

Historical population for the locality
Year	Pop.	±% p.a.
2006	336	—
2013	267	−3.23%
2018	261	−0.45%
2023	240	−1.66%

Āria locality had a population of 240 in the 2023 New Zealand census, a decrease of 21 people (−8.0%) since the 2018 census, and a decrease of 27 people (−10.1%) since the 2013 census. There were 129 males and 111 females in 84 dwellings. There were 54 people (22.5%) aged under 15 years, 39 (16.2%) aged 15 to 29, 117 (48.8%) aged 30 to 64, and 27 (11.2%) aged 65 or older.

People could identify as more than one ethnicity. The results were 68.8% European (Pākehā), 40.0% Māori, 1.2% Pasifika, and 2.5% Asian. English was spoken by 96.2%, Māori by 7.5%, and other languages by 3.8%. No language could be spoken by 2.5% (e.g. too young to talk). The percentage of people born overseas was 8.8, compared with 28.8% nationally.

Religious affiliations were 26.2% Christian, and 7.5% Māori religious beliefs. People who answered that they had no religion were 63.8%, and 5.0% of people did not answer the census question.

Of those at least 15 years old, 24 (12.9%) people had a bachelor's or higher degree, 114 (61.3%) had a post-high school certificate or diploma, and 42 (22.6%) people exclusively held high school qualifications. 6 people (3.2%) earned over $100,000 compared to 12.1% nationally. The employment status of those at least 15 was 117 (62.9%) full-time, 21 (11.3%) part-time, and 3 (1.6%) unemployed.

=== Aria statistical area ===
Aria statistical area, which also includes Piopio, covers 531.76 km^{2} (205.31 sq mi). It had an estimated population of 1,290 as of June 2025, with a population density of 2.4 people per km^{2}.

Historical population for the statistical area
Year	Pop.	±% p.a.
2006	1,359	—
2013	1,194	−1.83%
2018	1,290	+1.56%
2023	1,263	−0.42%

Aria statistical area had a population of 1,263 in the 2023 New Zealand census, a decrease of 27 people (−2.1%) since the 2018 census, and an increase of 69 people (5.8%) since the 2013 census. There were 648 males and 615 females in 471 dwellings. 0.5% of people identified as LGBTIQ+. The median age was 37.4 years (compared with 38.1 years nationally). There were 309 people (24.5%) aged under 15 years, 201 (15.9%) aged 15 to 29, 546 (43.2%) aged 30 to 64, and 204 (16.2%) aged 65 or older.

People could identify as more than one ethnicity. The results were 73.9% European (Pākehā); 38.7% Māori; 3.1% Pasifika; 1.7% Asian; 0.5% Middle Eastern, Latin American and African New Zealanders (MELAA); and 1.9% other, which includes people giving their ethnicity as "New Zealander". English was spoken by 98.1%, Māori by 8.1%, and other languages by 4.5%. No language could be spoken by 1.4% (e.g. too young to talk). New Zealand Sign Language was known by 0.5%. The percentage of people born overseas was 7.4, compared with 28.8% nationally.

Religious affiliations were 25.7% Christian, 0.5% Hindu, 0.2% Islam, 3.8% Māori religious beliefs, 0.5% Buddhist, 0.7% New Age, and 0.5% other religions. People who answered that they had no religion were 61.3%, and 6.9% of people did not answer the census question.

Of those at least 15 years old, 126 (13.2%) people had a bachelor's or higher degree, 564 (59.1%) had a post-high school certificate or diploma, and 261 (27.4%) people exclusively held high school qualifications. The median income was $40,800, compared with $41,500 nationally. 69 people (7.2%) earned over $100,000 compared to 12.1% nationally. The employment status of those at least 15 was 558 (58.5%) full-time, 135 (14.2%) part-time, and 18 (1.9%) unemployed.

== Education ==
Āria School is a co-educational state primary school, with a roll of 45 as of July 2026. The school was established in 1908.

== Economy ==
Serpentine has been quarried near Āria since at least 1952, when a temporary seal was laid on the main road near Te Kūiti to carry trucks loaded with serpentine from Āria. At the Kohua Road quarry, a layer of limestone lies above the serpentine, allowing both to be produced from the one site.

Ian Rorison took over the quarry in the mid 1960s, and from 1971 it was run by his company, Rorison Mineral Developments (RMD). Serpentine from Āria was a key ingredient in serpentine superphosphate, supplying magnesium for pasture. RMD’s truck fleet delivered it to fertiliser works throughout the North Island, while lime from the quarry was supplied to farms in Taranaki, the King Country, Waikato and the Bay of Plenty. By 2000 the company was producing around 19,000 tonnes of serpentine a year.

The business, now trading as Rorisons, opened Riverside Quarry near Piopio in 2011 to expand its lime production. After more than 60 years, serpentine quarrying at Kohua Road finished in 2016, and the site now operates as the company’s fertiliser blending site.

== Climate ==
Climate data for Wairere (1981–2010)
Month	Jan	Feb	Mar	Apr	May	Jun	Jul	Aug	Sep	Oct	Nov	Dec	Year
Mean daily maximum °C (°F)	22.9 (73.2)	23.4 (74.1)	21.9 (71.4)	19.0 (66.2)	16.0 (60.8)	13.3 (55.9)	12.9 (55.2)	13.8 (56.8)	15.3 (59.5)	16.7 (62.1)	18.9 (66.0)	21.1 (70.0)	17.9 (64.3)
Daily mean °C (°F)	17.4 (63.3)	17.8 (64.0)	16.1 (61.0)	13.3 (55.9)	11.0 (51.8)	8.8 (47.8)	8.1 (46.6)	9.1 (48.4)	10.8 (51.4)	12.3 (54.1)	14.1 (57.4)	16.1 (61.0)	12.9 (55.2)
Mean daily minimum °C (°F)	12.0 (53.6)	12.3 (54.1)	10.3 (50.5)	7.6 (45.7)	5.9 (42.6)	4.3 (39.7)	3.3 (37.9)	4.3 (39.7)	6.3 (43.3)	7.9 (46.2)	9.2 (48.6)	11.1 (52.0)	7.9 (46.2)
Average rainfall mm (inches)	114.7 (4.52)	84.6 (3.33)	112.3 (4.42)	81.7 (3.22)	141.0 (5.55)	157.3 (6.19)	136.6 (5.38)	103.6 (4.08)	118.4 (4.66)	143.9 (5.67)	96.9 (3.81)	107.0 (4.21)	1,398 (55.04)
Source: NIWA
