= Waikawau River (Waitomo District) =

Location
- Country: New Zealand

Physical characteristics
- Source
  - location: Herangi Range
- Mouth
  - location: North Taranaki Bight
  - coordinates: 38.478°S 174.636°E
  - elevation: 0 metres (0 ft)
- Length: 13 km (8 mi)

The Waikawau River is a river of the Waitomo District in the southern Waikato region. It flows generally west from the Herangi Range to reach the North Taranaki Bight 20 kilometres (12 mi) north of Mokau.

The New Zealand Ministry for Culture and Heritage gives a translation of "water of the shag" for Waikawau.

== See also ==
- List of rivers of New Zealand
