= Mōkau =

Settlement in Waikato, New Zealand

- Village
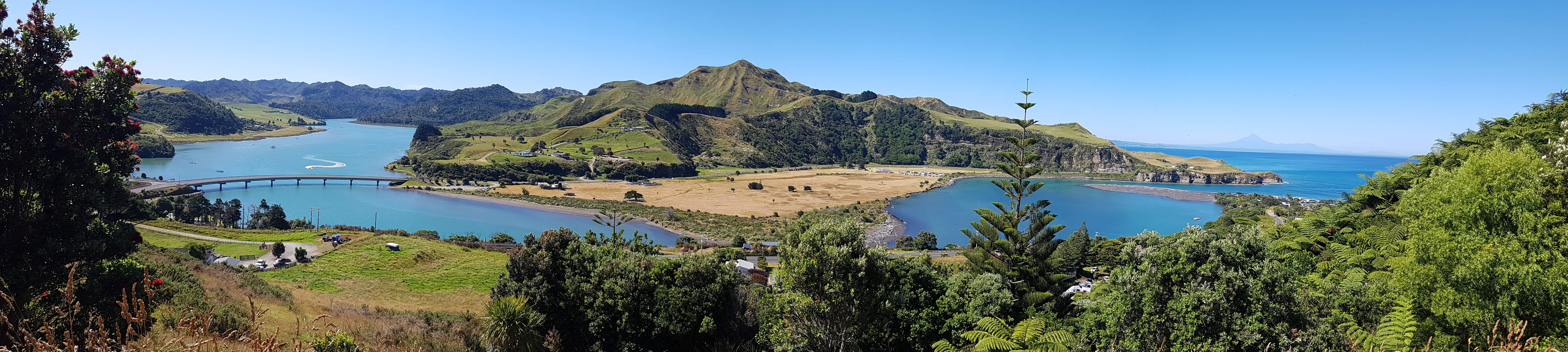
- Mōkau panorama: river, SH3 bridge, beach - and Mt. Taranaki far away (82km = 51mi) in the background
- Interactive map of Mōkau
- Coordinates: 38°41′S 174°37′E
- Country: New Zealand
- Region: Waikato region
- District: Waitomo District
- Ward: Waitomo Rural Ward
- Electorates: Taranaki-King Country; Te Tai Hauāuru (Māori)

Government
  - Territorial Authority: Waitomo District Council
  - Regional council: Waikato Regional Council
  - Mayor of Waitomo: John Robertson
  - Taranaki-King Country MP: Barbara Kuriger
  - Hauraki-Waikato MP: Hana-Rawhiti Maipi-Clarke

Area
  - Territorial: 2.24 km^{2} (0.86 sq mi)

Population (June 2025)
  - Territorial: 110
  - Density: 49/km^{2} (130/sq mi)
- Time zone: UTC+12 (NZST)
  - Summer (DST): UTC+13 (NZDT)

Mōkau is a small town on the west coast of New Zealand's North Island, located at the mouth of the Mōkau River on the North Taranaki Bight. Mōkau is in the Waitomo District and Waikato region local government areas, just north of the boundary with the New Plymouth District and the Taranaki Region. Prior to 1989, the town was classed as being in Taranaki, and there is still a feeling that the community of interest is most associated with New Plymouth, 90 km to the southwest. State Highway 3 passes through the town on its route from Te Kūiti to Waitara and, eventually, New Plymouth.

The Mōkau River Bridge opened in 1927.

Mōkau is a popular location for whitebaiting and other fishing including for kahawai (mainly found at the river mouth) and snapper (which are found right along the coast in several spots).

Mōkau also has a couple of outstanding surf breaks that, in the right conditions, can produce waves of up to 6 ft (1.8m).

The local marae, Te Kawau Papakainga Marae and Waiopapa meeting house, are affiliated with the Ngāti Maniapoto hapū of Ngāti Rākei, Rōrā and Rungaterangi.

== Demographics ==
Statistics New Zealand describes Mōkau as a rural settlement, which covers 2.24 km^{2} (0.86 sq mi). It had an estimated population of 110 as of June 2025, with a population density of 49 people per km^{2}. The settlement is part of the larger Herangi statistical area.

Historical population
Year	Pop.	±% p.a.
2006	129	—
2013	93	−4.57%
2018	99	+1.26%
2023	114	+2.86%
The 2006 population is for a significantly larger area of 19.82 km^{2}. Source:

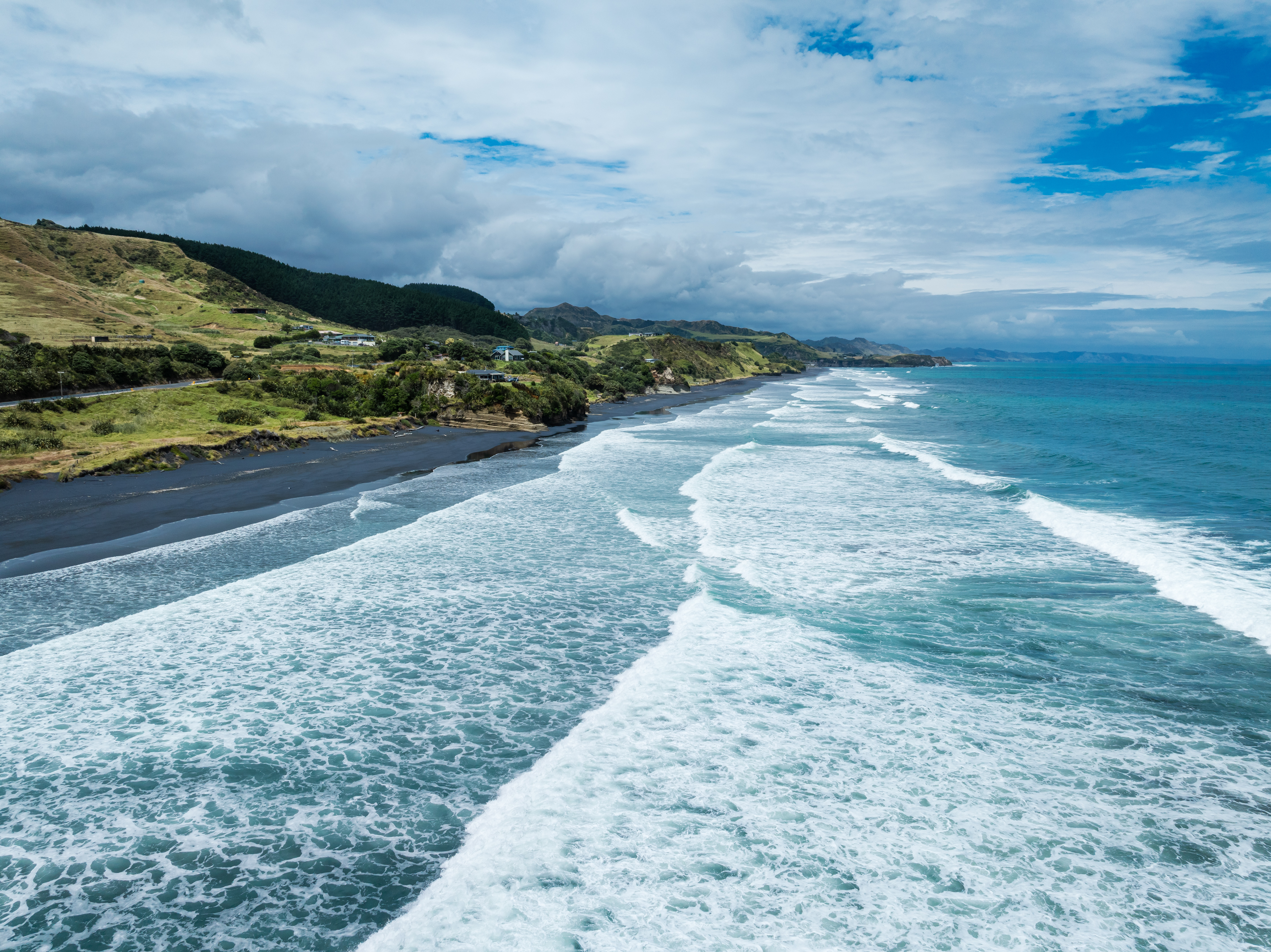
Aerial view of the coast looking south towards Mōkau.

Mōkau had a population of 114 in the 2023 New Zealand census, an increase of 15 people (15.2%) since the 2018 census, and an increase of 21 people (22.6%) since the 2013 census. There were 60 males and 54 females in 60 dwellings. The median age was 62.0 years (compared with 38.1 years nationally). There were 6 people (5.3%) aged under 15 years, 6 (5.3%) aged 15 to 29, 57 (50.0%) aged 30 to 64, and 42 (36.8%) aged 65 or older.

People could identify as more than one ethnicity. The results were 84.2% European (Pākehā), 28.9% Māori, 5.3% Asian, and 7.9% other, which includes people giving their ethnicity as "New Zealander". English was spoken by 100.0%, Māori by 2.6%, and other languages by 5.3%. The percentage of people born overseas was 7.9, compared with 28.8% nationally.

Religious affiliations were 34.2% Christian, 2.6% Māori religious beliefs, and 2.6% Buddhist. People who answered that they had no religion were 52.6%, and 10.5% of people did not answer the census question.

Of those at least 15 years old, 9 (8.3%) people had a bachelor's or higher degree, 51 (47.2%) had a post-high school certificate or diploma, and 48 (44.4%) people exclusively held high school qualifications. The median income was $28,100, compared with $41,500 nationally. 9 people (8.3%) earned over $100,000 compared to 12.1% nationally. The employment status of those at least 15 was 33 (30.6%) full-time and 18 (16.7%) part-time.

== Education ==
Mōkau School is a co-educational state primary school, with a roll of 21 as of July 2026. It opened in 1894.

== Museum and art gallery ==
Mōkau has a small community museum and art gallery.

== Climate ==
Climate data for Mōkau (1991–2020)
Month	Jan	Feb	Mar	Apr	May	Jun	Jul	Aug	Sep	Oct	Nov	Dec	Year
Mean daily maximum °C (°F)	21.8 (71.2)	22.6 (72.7)	21.2 (70.2)	18.8 (65.8)	16.6 (61.9)	14.8 (58.6)	13.8 (56.8)	14.1 (57.4)	15.4 (59.7)	16.5 (61.7)	18.0 (64.4)	20.0 (68.0)	17.8 (64.0)
Daily mean °C (°F)	18.3 (64.9)	18.8 (65.8)	17.3 (63.1)	15.2 (59.4)	13.3 (55.9)	11.3 (52.3)	10.3 (50.5)	10.7 (51.3)	12.0 (53.6)	13.2 (55.8)	14.5 (58.1)	16.8 (62.2)	14.3 (57.7)
Mean daily minimum °C (°F)	14.7 (58.5)	14.9 (58.8)	13.4 (56.1)	11.6 (52.9)	9.9 (49.8)	7.8 (46.0)	6.8 (44.2)	7.2 (45.0)	8.6 (47.5)	9.8 (49.6)	11.0 (51.8)	13.5 (56.3)	10.8 (51.4)
Average rainfall mm (inches)	96.4 (3.80)	98.6 (3.88)	144.0 (5.67)	138.4 (5.45)	130.0 (5.12)	152.6 (6.01)	149.5 (5.89)	138.3 (5.44)	115.7 (4.56)	114.6 (4.51)	128.6 (5.06)	105.8 (4.17)	1,512.5 (59.56)
Source: NIWA (rain 1981–2010)
