= Taharoa =

Settlement in Waikato, New Zealand

- Village
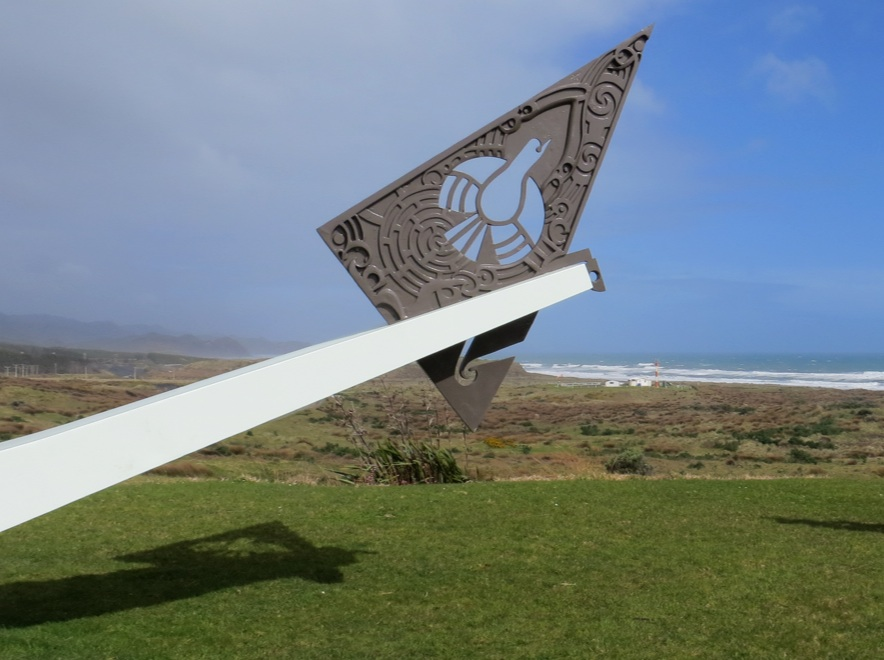
- The plaque below the symbol reads - The Prime Minister, the Rt Hon. N E Kirk, unveiled this symbol of co-operation between New Zealand Steel Limited and the Maori people of Taharoa to mark the official opening of the Taharoa ironsands operation on 24 November 1973.
- Interactive map of Taharoa
- Coordinates: 38°09′03″S 174°44′01″E
- Country: New Zealand
- Region: Waikato region
- District: Waitomo District
- Ward: Waitomo Rural Ward
- Electorates: Taranaki-King Country; Te Tai Hauāuru (Māori)

Government
  - Territorial Authority: Waitomo District Council
  - Regional council: Waikato Regional Council
  - Mayor of Waitomo: John Robertson
  - Taranaki-King Country MP: Barbara Kuriger
  - Hauraki-Waikato MP: Hana-Rawhiti Maipi-Clarke

Area
  - Territorial: 2.56 km^{2} (0.99 sq mi)
- Elevation: 50 m (160 ft)

Population (June 2025)
  - Territorial: 170
  - Density: 66/km^{2} (170/sq mi)
- Time zone: UTC+12 (NZST)
  - Summer (DST): UTC+13 (NZDT)

Taharoa (Māori: Tahaaroa or Tahāroa) is a small village on the west coast of the North Island of New Zealand, to the southwest of Kawhia Harbour and overlooking Lake Taharoa.

The New Zealand Ministry for Culture and Heritage gives a translation of "long coast" for Tahāroa however traditional histories state that the extended name is “Te Tahaaroa a Ruaputahanga” or the “long calabash of Ruaputahanga”.

== History and culture ==
It was at times the temporary home of the great Te Rauparaha used mainly as a battle ground on the vast expanses of sand dunes evident by the number of finds over the years, by 1822 they were being forced out of their land by stronger northern tribes. Te Rauparaha then began a fighting retreat or migration southwards, one which ended with them controlling a small part of the North Island and particularly Kapiti Island, which became the tribal stronghold.

=== Marae ===
Taharoa has two marae: Āruka Marae and Tahaaroa meeting house, and Te Kōraha Marae and Te Ōhākī meeting house. Both are affiliated with the Waikato Tainui hapū of Ngāti Mahuta ki te Hauāuru and Ngāti Rangitaka.

== Iron sand mining ==
The main industrial activity is iron sand mining, run by New Zealand Steel, which began in 1972 was exporting about 1.4 Mt (1,500,000 short tons) a year, mainly to Japan, with small quantities to South Korea and China. A 1993 study put reserves at 205 Mt of high concentrate and 360 Mt of lower grade sand. An $80m investment in 2014 boosted potential exports to 4 Mt a year.

In 2000 mining moved 2 km (1.2 mi) north, after the southern area was worked out. The roadway used for the move is now an airstrip. Sand from the lake is dug by a 250 tonne cutter suction dredge, a 450 tonne floating Trommel screen removes particles larger than 2.5 mm (0.098 in), a 1,000 tonne floating concentrator removes lighter material and the denser sand is magnetically separated.

1,375 tonnes an hour of sand was piped 2.5 km (1.6 mi) to an offshore mono-buoy, which was extended a further 500m in 2012, replaced in 2017 and is 17 m (56 ft) wide and weighs 250 tons. The previous buoy was 11 m (36 ft) wide and weighed 185 tons. The three bulk carriers used to transport the sand, Taharoa Destiny, Taharoa Providence and Taharoa Eos, require a pilot to berth at the buoy and also a support boat to move ropes and pipes.

The mine employs about 150 workers, though only 108 were recorded as working in the whole Taharoa area in the 2013 census. To house its workers, NZ Steel built 65 houses, a hall, Kōhanga Reo, school, shop, and fire and ambulance facilities in the village.

== Demographics ==
Statistics New Zealand describes Taharoa as a rural settlement, which covers 2.56 km^{2} (0.99 sq mi). It had an estimated population of 170 as of June 2025, with a population density of 66 people per km^{2}. The settlement is part of the larger Herangi statistical area.

Historical population for Taharoa
Year	Pop.	±% p.a.
2006	165	—
2013	180	+1.25%
2018	171	−1.02%
2023	159	−1.44%

Taharoa had a population of 159 in the 2023 New Zealand census, a decrease of 12 people (−7.0%) since the 2018 census, and a decrease of 21 people (−11.7%) since the 2013 census. There were 81 males and 78 females in 78 dwellings. 1.9% of people identified as LGBTIQ+. The median age was 31.2 years (compared with 38.1 years nationally). There were 42 people (26.4%) aged under 15 years, 36 (22.6%) aged 15 to 29, 78 (49.1%) aged 30 to 64, and 6 (3.8%) aged 65 or older.

People could identify as more than one ethnicity. The results were 18.9% European (Pākehā); 98.1% Māori; 5.7% Pasifika; and 1.9% Middle Eastern, Latin American and African New Zealanders (MELAA). English was spoken by 100.0%, Māori by 34.0%, and other languages by 1.9%. No language could be spoken by 1.9% (e.g. too young to talk). New Zealand Sign Language was known by 3.8%. The percentage of people born overseas was 1.9, compared with 28.8% nationally.

Religious affiliations were 39.6% Christian, 7.5% Māori religious beliefs, and 1.9% New Age. People who answered that they had no religion were 45.3%, and 7.5% of people did not answer the census question.

Of those at least 15 years old, 12 (10.3%) people had a bachelor's or higher degree, 78 (66.7%) had a post-high school certificate or diploma, and 33 (28.2%) people exclusively held high school qualifications. The median income was $44,300, compared with $41,500 nationally. 24 people (20.5%) earned over $100,000 compared to 12.1% nationally. The employment status of those at least 15 was 72 (61.5%) full-time, 15 (12.8%) part-time, and 6 (5.1%) unemployed.

=== Herangi statistical area ===
Herangi statistical area, which also includes Te Anga, Mahoenui, Marokopa, Mokau and Awakino, covers 1,668.25 km^{2} (644.11 sq mi) and had an estimated population of 1,120 as of June 2025, with a population density of 0.67 people per km^{2}.

Historical population for Herangi
Year	Pop.	±% p.a.
2006	1,179	—
2013	1,056	−1.56%
2018	990	−1.28%
2023	1,095	+2.04%

Herangi had a population of 1,095 in the 2023 New Zealand census, an increase of 105 people (10.6%) since the 2018 census, and an increase of 39 people (3.7%) since the 2013 census. There were 570 males and 525 females in 492 dwellings. 1.1% of people identified as LGBTIQ+. The median age was 47.0 years (compared with 38.1 years nationally). There were 210 people (19.2%) aged under 15 years, 144 (13.2%) aged 15 to 29, 528 (48.2%) aged 30 to 64, and 216 (19.7%) aged 65 or older.

People could identify as more than one ethnicity. The results were 74.8% European (Pākehā); 38.4% Māori; 1.1% Pasifika; 1.1% Asian; 0.3% Middle Eastern, Latin American and African New Zealanders (MELAA); and 3.3% other, which includes people giving their ethnicity as "New Zealander". English was spoken by 97.8%, Māori by 10.4%, and other languages by 3.0%. No language could be spoken by 2.2% (e.g. too young to talk). New Zealand Sign Language was known by 0.8%. The percentage of people born overseas was 7.9, compared with 28.8% nationally.

Religious affiliations were 33.7% Christian, 3.0% Māori religious beliefs, 0.3% Buddhist, 0.5% New Age, and 0.3% other religions. People who answered that they had no religion were 55.1%, and 7.4% of people did not answer the census question.

Of those at least 15 years old, 138 (15.6%) people had a bachelor's or higher degree, 486 (54.9%) had a post-high school certificate or diploma, and 264 (29.8%) people exclusively held high school qualifications. The median income was $32,600, compared with $41,500 nationally. 75 people (8.5%) earned over $100,000 compared to 12.1% nationally. The employment status of those at least 15 was 423 (47.8%) full-time, 132 (14.9%) part-time, and 27 (3.1%) unemployed.

== Education ==
Kinohaku School is a co-educational state primary school, with a roll of 12 as of July 2026. It opened in 1907.

Te Kura o Tahaaroa is a co-educational state Māori immersion school, with a roll of 24. It opened as Taharoa Maori Native school in 1911 and was renamed Taharoa School in 1963. In 2000, it was renamed Te Kura o Tahaaroa in 2000.

== Climate ==
Climate data for Port Taharoa (1991–2020)
Month	Jan	Feb	Mar	Apr	May	Jun	Jul	Aug	Sep	Oct	Nov	Dec	Year
Mean daily maximum °C (°F)	22.8 (73.0)	23.5 (74.3)	22.2 (72.0)	19.9 (67.8)	17.5 (63.5)	15.2 (59.4)	14.4 (57.9)	14.7 (58.5)	15.9 (60.6)	17.1 (62.8)	18.7 (65.7)	20.9 (69.6)	18.6 (65.4)
Daily mean °C (°F)	19.1 (66.4)	19.7 (67.5)	18.4 (65.1)	16.4 (61.5)	14.3 (57.7)	12.1 (53.8)	11.2 (52.2)	11.5 (52.7)	12.7 (54.9)	14.0 (57.2)	15.4 (59.7)	17.6 (63.7)	15.2 (59.4)
Mean daily minimum °C (°F)	15.4 (59.7)	16.0 (60.8)	14.5 (58.1)	12.8 (55.0)	11.0 (51.8)	9.0 (48.2)	7.9 (46.2)	8.3 (46.9)	9.5 (49.1)	11.0 (51.8)	12.1 (53.8)	14.3 (57.7)	11.8 (53.3)
Average rainfall mm (inches)	64.4 (2.54)	56.6 (2.23)	68.1 (2.68)	84.1 (3.31)	132.2 (5.20)	145.4 (5.72)	137.2 (5.40)	134.1 (5.28)	109.1 (4.30)	85.0 (3.35)	88.9 (3.50)	124.1 (4.89)	1,229.2 (48.4)
Source: NIWA
