= Waikawau River =

Waikawau River is the name of three rivers of the Waikato Region in the North Island of New Zealand.

- Waikawau River (Thames-Coromandel District) (2 separate rivers)
- Waikawau River (Waitomo District)
