= Piopio College =

Location
- 18 Aria Road, Piopio; 38°28′22.84″S 175°0′49.51″E

Information
- Type: Co-Ed. Year 7–13.
- Established: 1975
- Ministry of Education Institution no.: 162
- Principal: Ben Draper
- Enrolment: 159 (July 2026)
- Socio-economic decile: 5M
- Website: piopio.school.nz

Piopio College is a coeducational secondary school in Piopio, a town in the Waitomo District of New Zealand.

== History ==
The College opened in 1975 when Piopio District High School was separated into Piopio Primary School and Piopio College. It won the Goodman Fielder Best School of the Year Award in 1999 jointly with Patearoa School.

Piopio District High School was formed in 1924. It was the first school in New Zealand to have a school bus service.

A combined schools centenary was held in March 2009.

== Enrolment ==
As of July 2026, Piopio College has a roll of 159 students, of which 81 (50.9%) identify as Māori.

As of 2026, the school has an Equity Index of 499, placing it amongst schools whose students have many socioeconomic barriers to achievement (roughly equivalent to deciles 2 and 3 under the former socio-economic decile system).

== Notable alumni ==
- David Fagan – world class shearer
- Jenny-May Coffin – former Silver Ferns netball player, for which she was the vice-captain in 2001; TVNZ presenter
- Hannah Osborne – Olympic rower
- Farah Palmer – former captain of the Black Ferns
- Rob Waddell – world and Olympic champion rower; grinder for Team New Zealand in the Americas Cup

== Principals ==
- Bob Ford (1975–1979)
- Brian Tegg (1980–2001)
- Tim Davies-Colley (2002–2007)
- David Day (2008–2012)
- Julie Radice (2013–2015)
- Johan van Deventer (2017–2021)
- Rakesh Govind (2022–2024)
- Ben Draper (2024–present)
