= Mōkau River =

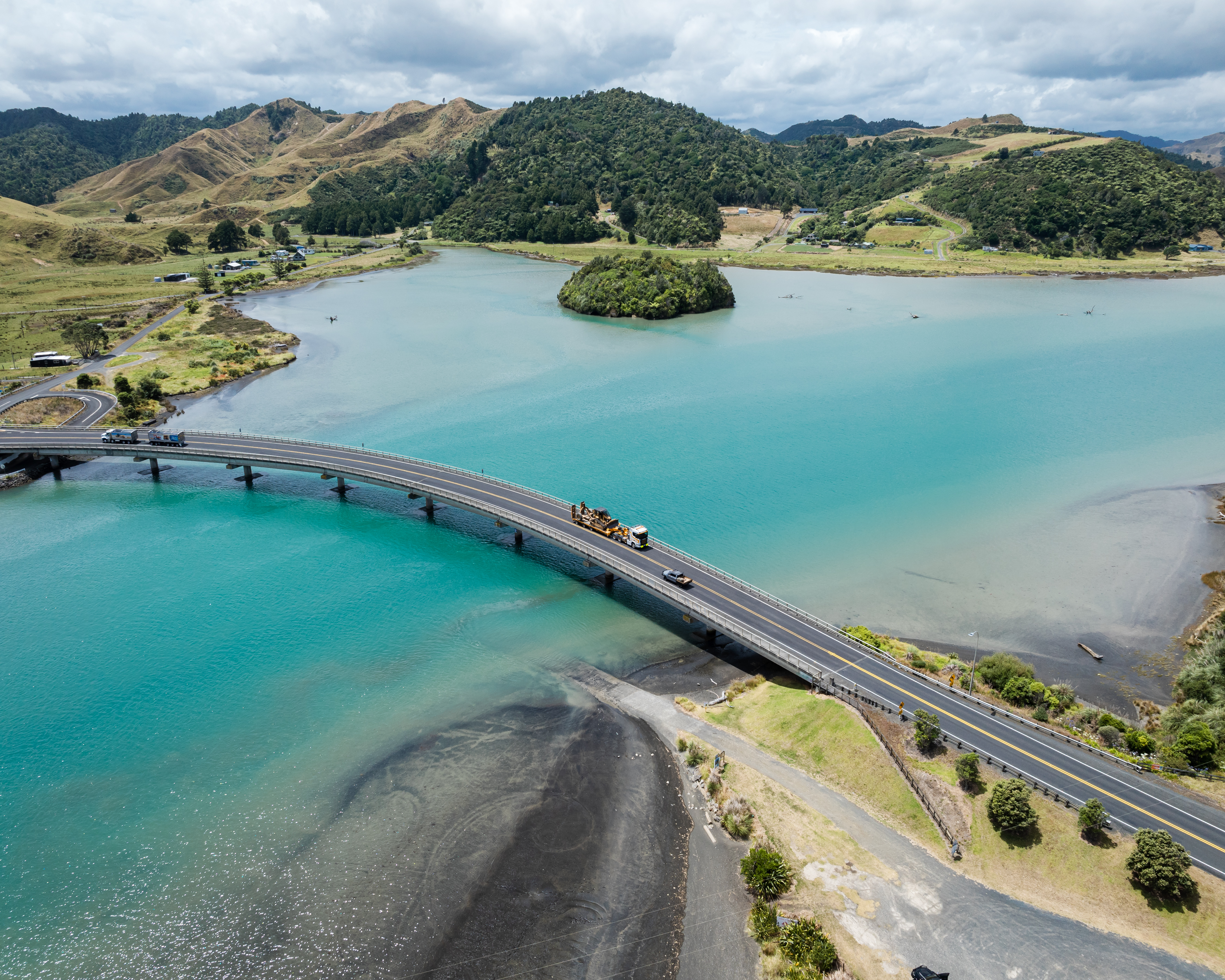
- The Mōkau river near the mouth

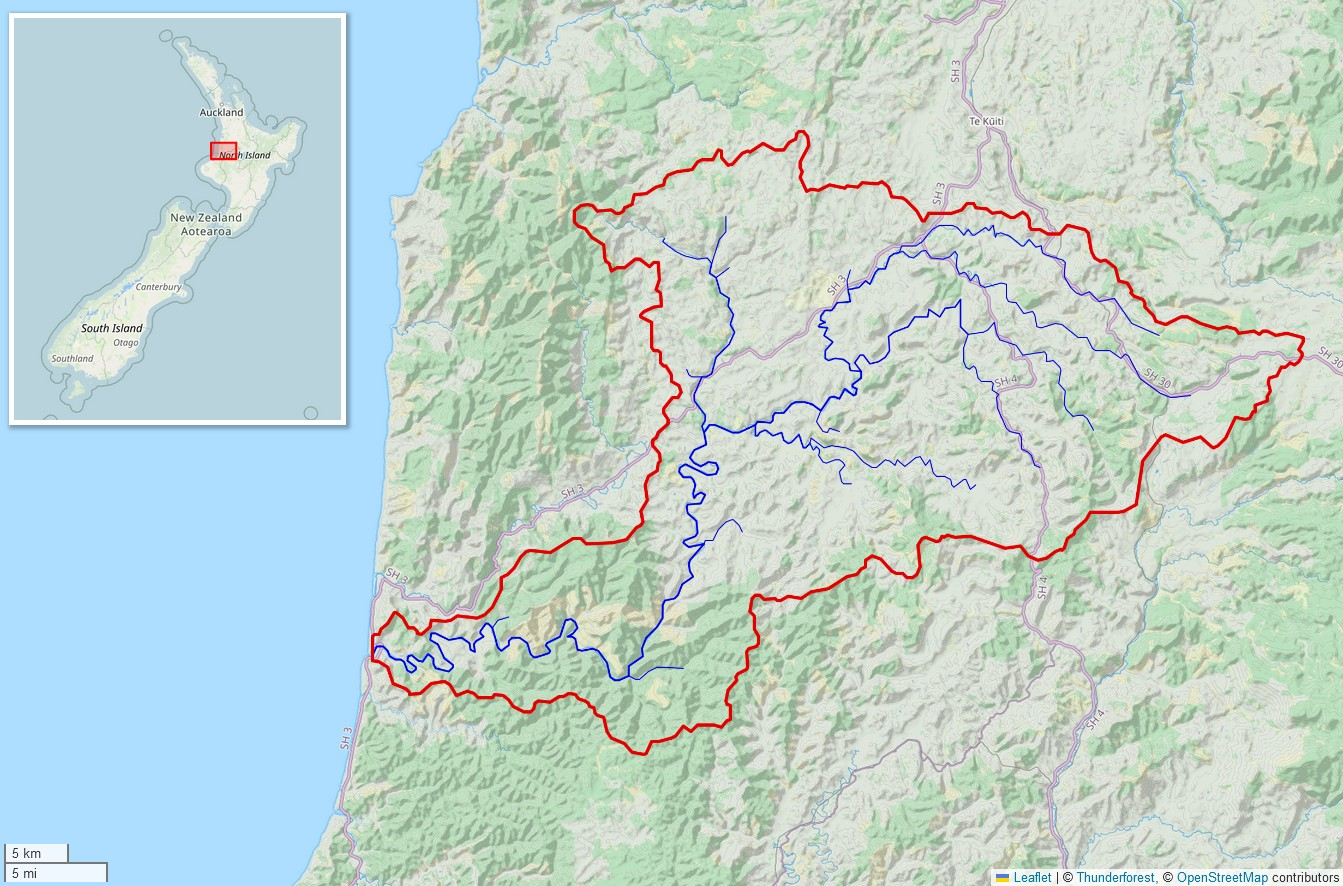
- Mōkau River basin (Interactive map)
- Native name: Mōkau (Māori)

Location
- Country: New Zealand
- Region: Waikato
- District: Waitomo

Physical characteristics
- Source: Pureora Forest
  - location: about 1 km south of Magokewa, near State Highway 30
  - coordinates: 38°28′23″S 175°17′38″E
- Mouth: North Taranaki Bight
  - coordinates: 38°42′22″S 174°36′54″E
- Length: 158 kilometres (98 mi)

The Mōkau River is located in the North Island of New Zealand.

The river rises as a spring in the Pureora Forest, south of Te Kūiti, on the slopes of the Rangitoto Range. After briefly following a north-westward course, it turns south-westwards and flows for 158 kilometres (98 mi) through the Waitomo District of the King Country. It enters the North Taranaki Bight at its mouth at the town of Mōkau.

Although the rivermouth is enclosed by a large sandbar, with a high tide, larger vessels can pass safely and enter the river, which is navigable for 37 kilometres (23 mi) upstream. In the late 19th century and early 20th century, the banks of the river were host to a thriving industry of logging and coal-mining. However, the risks and costs of transporting goods down the Mōkau eventually ended such enterprise.

Today the river is a popular whitebaiting and kayaking location.

== See also ==
Wairere Power Station
