= Awakino River (Waikato) =

River in Waikato, New Zealand

Coordinates: 38.665004°S 174.621295°E

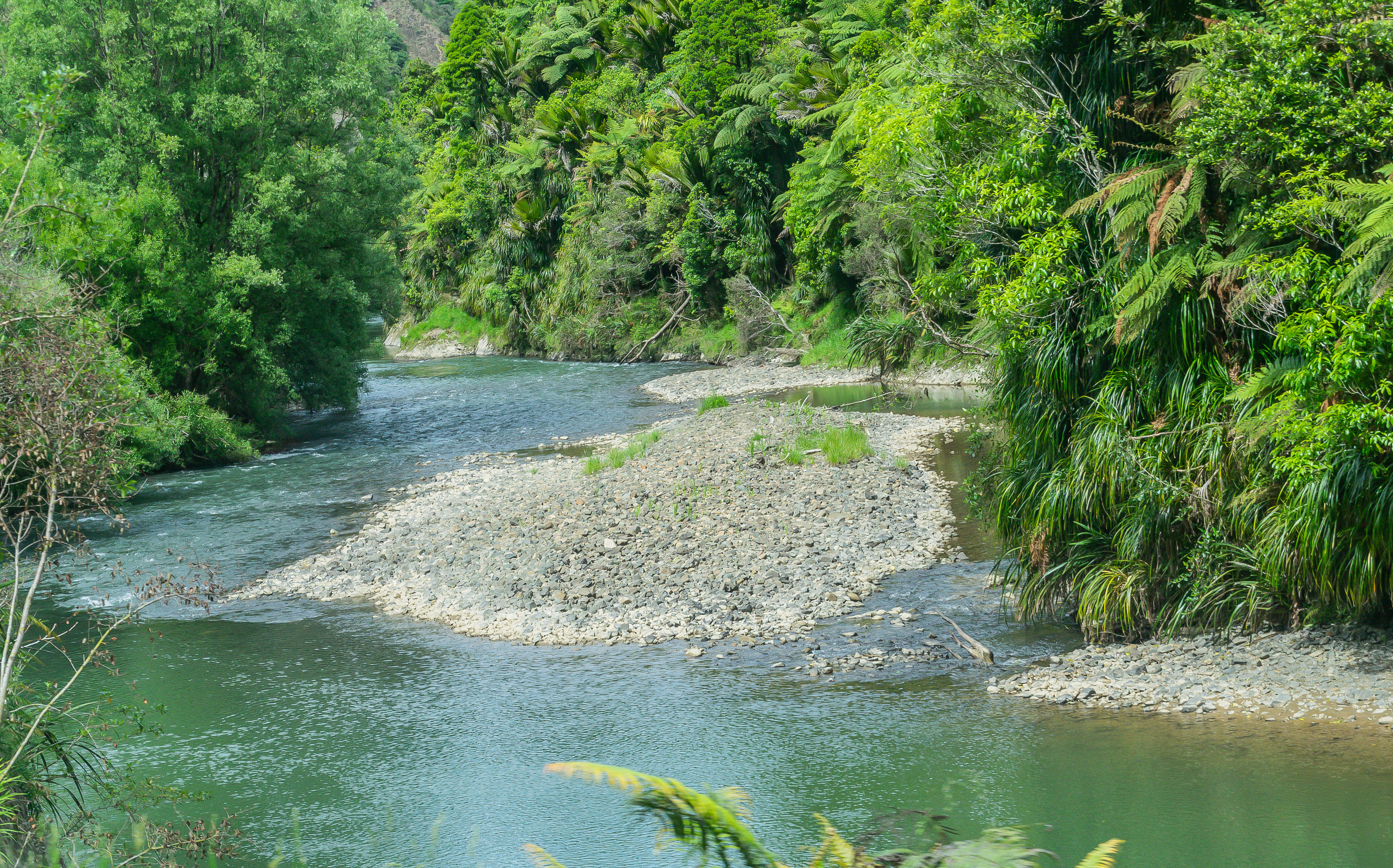
Awakino River

The Awakino River is a river located in the North Island of New Zealand. It has been described as one of the great rivers in the North Island providing top-quality backcountry fishing. Awakino township lies on its river banks. It rises on peaks of up to 762 m (2,500 ft) in the Herangi Range and flows 75 km (47 mi), initially southerly and then through Awakino Gorge in a south-westerly direction.

== River route ==
The river rises in the rugged bush country of the King Country and flows south via the settlement of Mahoenui from where it runs alongside State Highway 3 to the Tasman Sea at Awakino.
