= Piopio, New Zealand =

Settlement in Waikato, New Zealand

Piopio
- Interactive map of Piopio
- Coordinates: 38°27′59.25″S 175°0′55.84″E
- Country: New Zealand
- Region: Waikato region
- District: Waitomo District
- Ward: Waitomo Rural Ward
- Electorates: Taranaki-King Country; Te Tai Hauāuru (Māori)

Government
  - Territorial Authority: Waitomo District Council
  - Regional council: Waikato Regional Council
  - Mayor of Waitomo: John Robertson
  - Taranaki-King Country MP: Barbara Kuriger
  - Hauraki-Waikato MP: Hana-Rawhiti Maipi-Clarke

Area
  - Total: 2.01 km^{2} (0.78 sq mi)

Population (June 2025)
  - Total: 460
  - Density: 230/km^{2} (590/sq mi)
- Time zone: UTC+12 (NZST)
  - Summer (DST): UTC+13 (NZDT)
- Area code: 07

Piopio is a small town in the Waitomo District. It is situated on State Highway 3 approximately 23 km from Te Kūiti.

== Demographics ==
Statistics New Zealand describes Piopio as a rural settlement, which covers 2.01 km^{2} (0.78 sq mi). It had an estimated population of 460 as of June 2025, with a population density of 229 people per km^{2}. The settlement is part of the larger Aria statistical area.

Historical population
Year	Pop.	±% p.a.
2006	468	—
2013	396	−2.36%
2018	468	+3.40%
2023	456	−0.52%

Piopio had a population of 456 in the 2023 New Zealand census, a decrease of 12 people (−2.6%) since the 2018 census, and an increase of 60 people (15.2%) since the 2013 census. There were 222 males and 231 females in 177 dwellings. 0.7% of people identified as LGBTIQ+. The median age was 37.4 years (compared with 38.1 years nationally). There were 105 people (23.0%) aged under 15 years, 78 (17.1%) aged 15 to 29, 186 (40.8%) aged 30 to 64, and 87 (19.1%) aged 65 or older.

People could identify as more than one ethnicity. The results were 63.2% European (Pākehā), 52.0% Māori, 2.0% Pasifika, 2.6% Asian, and 2.6% other, which includes people giving their ethnicity as "New Zealander". English was spoken by 98.0%, Māori by 11.8%, and other languages by 3.9%. No language could be spoken by 1.3% (e.g. too young to talk). New Zealand Sign Language was known by 0.7%. The percentage of people born overseas was 7.9, compared with 28.8% nationally.

Religious affiliations were 23.7% Christian, 0.7% Hindu, 0.7% Islam, 5.3% Māori religious beliefs, 1.3% Buddhist, 0.7% New Age, and 0.7% other religions. People who answered that they had no religion were 62.5%, and 3.9% of people did not answer the census question.

Of those at least 15 years old, 36 (10.3%) people had a bachelor's or higher degree, 198 (56.4%) had a post-high school certificate or diploma, and 117 (33.3%) people exclusively held high school qualifications. The median income was $34,000, compared with $41,500 nationally. 12 people (3.4%) earned over $100,000 compared to 12.1% nationally. The employment status of those at least 15 was 174 (49.6%) full-time, 51 (14.5%) part-time, and 9 (2.6%) unemployed.

== Marae ==
There are marae in the area, affiliated with the hapū of Ngāti Maniapoto:

- Mōkau Kohunui Marae and Ko Tama Tāne meeting house are affiliated with Apakura, Ngāti Kinohaku and Waiora
- Napinapi Marae and Parekahoki meeting house are affiliated with Ngāti Matakore and Pare te Kawa
- Te Paemate Marae and meeting house are affiliated with Paemate
- Mangarama Mara and Rongorongo meeting house are affiliated with Apakura.

== Education ==
Piopio College provides high school education for Year 7 to 13 students, with a roll of 159

Piopio School provides primary education for new entrants and Year 1 to 6 students, with a roll of 124.

Both schools are coeducational. Rolls are as of July 2026.

Piopio School opened in 1909. In 1924 it consolidated with other schools to form Piopio District High School. The secondary section shifted to an adjacent site in 1960 and later became Piopio College.

== Economy ==
Piopio was laid out around 1902 as a service town for the surrounding dairy farming district.

Lime and serpentine have been quarried at Kohua Road, near Āria and about 9 km from Piopio, since at least the 1960s. Rorison Mineral Developments operated the quarry from 1971, and its lime was supplied to farms across Taranaki, the King Country, Waikato and the Bay of Plenty. The business, now trading as Rorisons, opened the Riverside Wairere Lime Quarry near Piopio in 2011, and the Kohua Road site now operates as its fertiliser blending site.

== Notable people ==
- Hannah Osborne (born 1994), Olympic rower
- Merv Smith (1933–2018), broadcaster
- Cortez Ratima (born 2001), rugby union player
