= Kaiaua Bay (Gisborne) =

Bay on the East Coast of New Zealand's North Island

- Interactive map of Kaiaua Bay
- Location: Gisborne District, New Zealand
- Coordinates: 38.309°S 178.339°E
- Ocean/sea sources: Pacific Ocean

Kaiaua Bay is a bay on the East Coast of New Zealand's North Island, ten kilometres north of Tolaga Bay. It is under the jurisdiction the Gisborne District Council.

The New Zealand Ministry for Culture and Heritage gives a translation of "eating mullets" for Kaiaua.

The 1947 tsunami was 6' high when it hit the area.
