= State Highway 3 (New Zealand) =

Road in New Zealand

State Highway 3

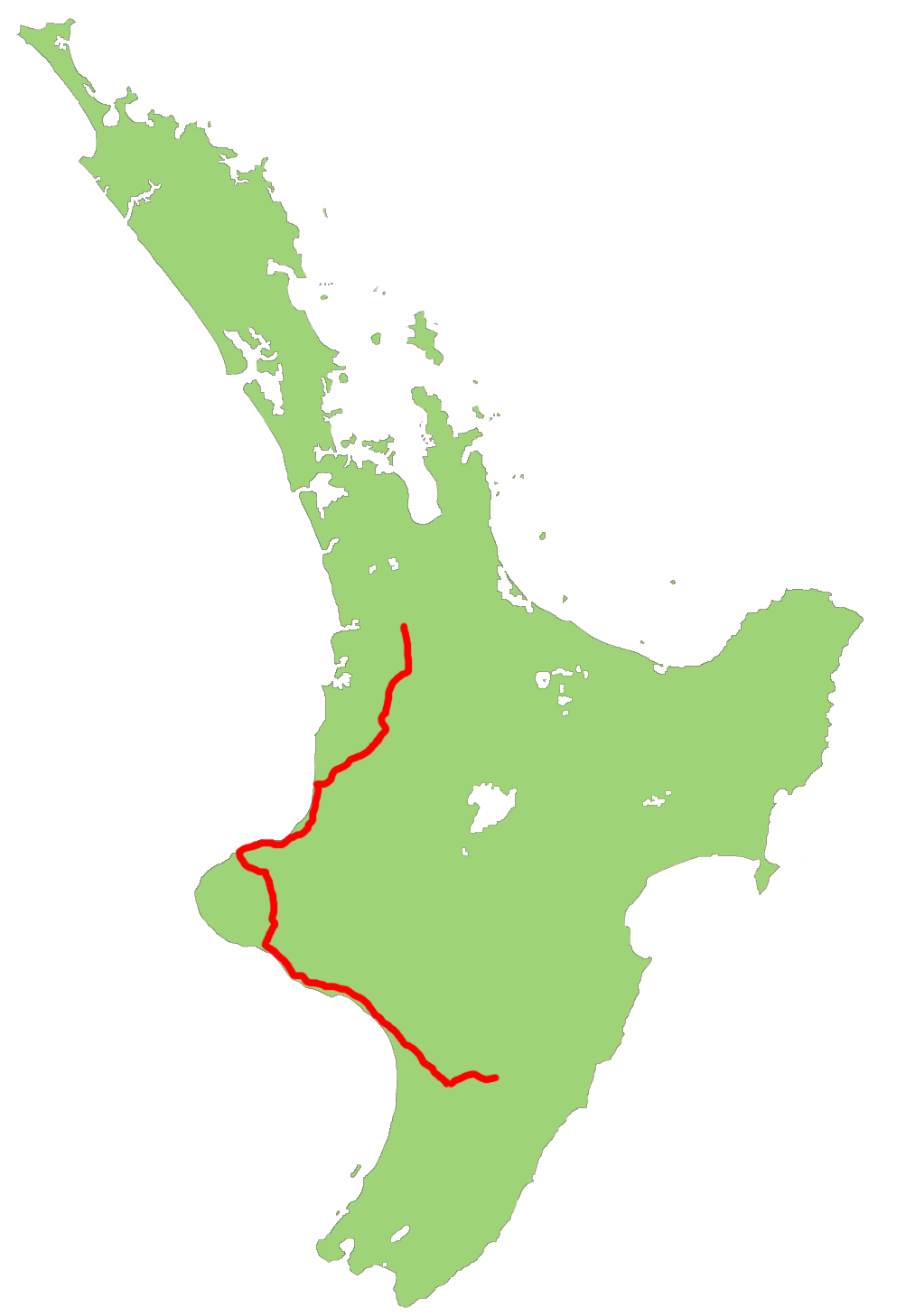

Route information
- Maintained by NZ Transport Agency Waka Kotahi
- Length: 500 km (310 mi)

Major junctions
- North end: SH 1C (Kahikatea Drive/Lorne Street) at Melville, in Hamilton
- SH 4 south at Eight Mile Junction (11 km (6.8 mi) south of Te Kūiti); SH 4 north (Putiki Drive) at Whanganui; SH 1 north (High Street) at Bulls; SH 1 south (Wellington Road) at Sanson
- South end: SH 2 (Vogel Street/McLean Street) at Woodville

Location
- Country: New Zealand
- Primary destinations: Te Awamutu, Kihikihi, Ōtorohanga, Te Kūiti, Piopio, Awakino, Mokau, Mount Messenger, New Plymouth, Egmont Village, Inglewood, Midhurst, Stratford, Eltham, Normandy, Hāwera, Pātea, Waverly, Whanganui, Bulls, Sanson, Palmerston North

Highway system
- New Zealand state highways; Motorways and expressways; List
← SH 2	→ SH 4

State Highway 3 (SH 3) is one of New Zealand's eight national state highways. It serves the west coast of the country's North Island and forms a link between State Highway 1 and State Highway 2. Distances are measured from north to south.

For most of its length SH 3 is a two-lane single carriageway, with at-grade intersections and property accesses, both in rural and urban areas.

== History ==
An 1871 account of a coach journey from New Plymouth to Wellington described the very poor road round the coast via Ōpunake to Whanganui and the much better and well used road south from there. A government subsidy of £3,000 (2016 equivalent $400,000) a year was being paid for the coach north of Whanganui.

A Mokau – Awakino horse track was widened to a dray track about 1897. It was then possible for a horse and buggy to cover the 110 mi (180 km) – now 162 km – from New Plymouth to Te Kūiti in 17½ hours. The first car to traverse the route from Auckland to New Plymouth seems to have been an 8 hp Cadillac in 1905, though Ōtorohanga to Te Kūiti was by train and, between Awakino and Mokau, a horse assisted on the beach.

A 1910 Te Kūiti meeting called for metalling of the road to Awakino. Mount Messenger Tunnel opened in 1916 and its single lane was enlarged about 1983. £3,000 (2016 equivalent $280,000) was provided in 1919 for the Awakino Gorge section, including the tunnel (enlarged in 2011), and it was opened in March 1923 at a total cost of about £60,000 (2016 equivalent $5.8m). Most of the route was gazetted as a government main highway in 1924, some sections were tar-sealed in 1925 and more work had been done on the road by 1936, leaving only a few mud sections. In 1937 the 6 mi (9.7 km) between Ōhaupō and Te Awamutu was the only unsealed section north of Tokanui. By 1949 the road was sealed as far south as Te Kūiti and the reinforced concrete bridge over the Waipā at Ōtorohanga had been started.

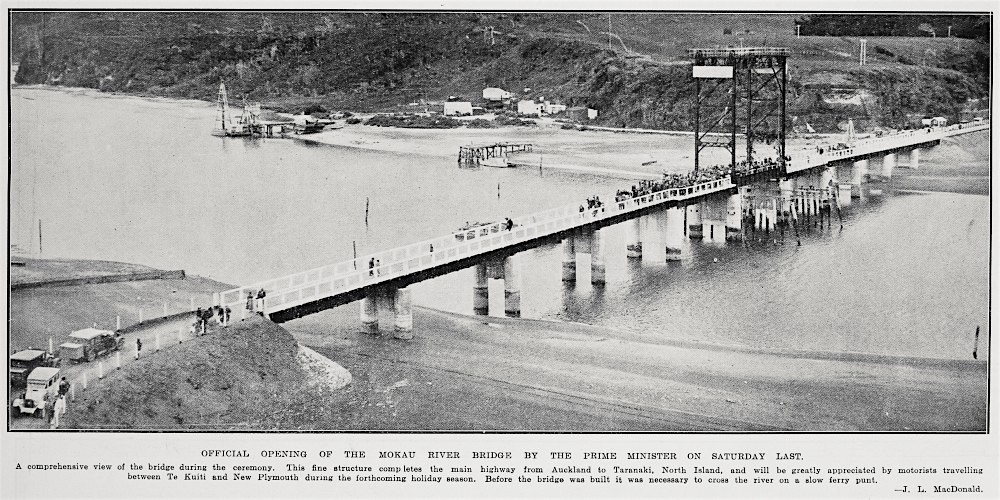
Mokau Bridge opened 1927

The 12 ft (3.7 m) wide, single-lane, 11-span, 670 ft (200 m), steel, Mokau Bridge opened in October 1927 (official opening 17 December), replacing a punt. The cost was £35,000 (2016 equivalent $3.3m). It had a lifting span allowing passage of vessels up to 50 ft (15 m) wide and with a 60 ft (18 m) clearance at high tide. In 2001 the 1927 bridge was replaced by the current 9-span, 230 m (250 yd), double lane, pre-stressed concrete bridge for $6.2m (2016 equivalent $8.5m). The current bridge does not allow for shipping, as the first ship to pass under the old lifting span was withdrawn three months after the bridge opened.

== Route ==
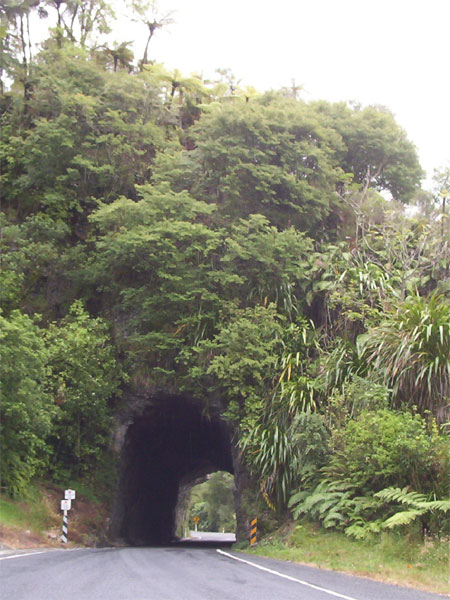
Tunnel at the north end of the Awakino Gorge, now bypassed by two bridges built in 2021. There is another short tunnel near the top of Mount Messenger

The highway leaves SH 1C at Hamilton, and initially heads south through farmland, passing through Te Awamutu. Sections of this stretch of the road are four-laned, but not divided carriageway. From Ōtorohanga it follows the valley of the Waipā River to Te Kūiti. The road then turns southwest through sparsely settled farmland, crossing several ridges before following the Awakino gorge to reach the coast, which it follows around the North Taranaki Bight. At the Tongaporutu River the highway turns inland to avoid coastal cliffs and climbs over Mount Messenger before descending via the Mimi River valley to return to the coast near Urenui. Bypassing Waitara, it reaches New Plymouth then turns inland, passing to the east of Mount Taranaki via Inglewood, Stratford and Eltham to Hāwera.

From Hāwera the highway follows the coast of the South Taranaki Bight south-eastwards to Pātea and Whanganui before leaving the coast and heading to Bulls. Here, SH 1 from the north intersects with SH 3, and the two highways are concurrent for the next 6 kilometres (3.7 mi) to Sanson where SH 1 diverges to the south. SH 3 continues its south-eastern route to Palmerston North, where it runs through the city streets and changes to a north-eastern direction near the city centre. It maintains this direction as far as Ashhurst, where it crosses the Manawatū River and intersects with SH 57. SH 3 then follows the Te Ahu a Turanga – Manawatū Tararua Highway (which replaced the former Manawatū Gorge route) entering Woodville and terminates at a junction with SH 2.

The Awakino gorge is prone to closure by slips and rockslides in heavy rain.

== Route changes ==
Construction of a bypass of Bell Block, a satellite town of New Plymouth, was completed in 2010. The bypass is a four-lane, divided expressway with an interchange at Henwood Road providing access to Bell Block.

In 2016, a section of SH 3 in Taranaki was realigned replacing the "deadly" Normanby overbridge.

In April 2017, the section of State Highway 3 through the Manawatu Gorge, east of Palmerston North, closed permanently after a major slip blocked the road, and due to land instability as well as the danger of more slips, with major slips blocking the road in previous years, the decision was made to close the road permanently. Traffic travelling between Manawatu and Hawkes Bay was diverted over the winding Saddle Road and Pahiatua Track. A new road was announced in March 2018, with construction beginning in January 2021.

In June 2025. The $824 million Te Ahu a Turanga Manawatu-Tararua Highway opened to traffic, taking heavy traffic off the Saddle Road and Pahiatua Track for the first time since 2017, when SH 3 through the Manawatu Gorge closed. SH 3 over the Manawatu-Tararua Highway is an 11.5km, 4-lane expressway with two roundabouts at each end and features multiple scenic lookout spots.

== Future improvements ==
State Highway 3 will form part of the future/proposed Southern Links motorway project in the South/West of Hamilton and Tamahere.

In January 2016, funding was announced for a road bypass of the tunnel north of New Plymouth. Construction of the Mount Messenger bypass was expected to begin within two years. On 24 August 2020 Te Korowai Tiahi o Te Hauauru, whose rohe the road crosses, withdrew support from the bypass roading project while in High Court. The Poutama Charitable Trust and New Plymouth locals protested against the project while court was in session, with the argument that this new route would destroy the valley's ecosystem. However, the Transport Agency responded by saying that the bypass is the least ecologically destructive and will deliver road safety. Construction of the Mount Messenger bypass, dubbed Te Ara o Te Ata, began on 6 October 2022.

== Spur sections ==
State Highway 3A
- Location: SH 3 west of Waitara – SH 3 at Inglewood
- Length: 15.6 km (9.7 mi)

SH 3 has one spur, designated State Highway 3A. This 15.6 km stretch links State Highway 3 just west of Waitara to Inglewood, providing a shortcut and bypass of New Plymouth. The entire length of highway carries the name Mountain Road with the sole exception being a very short link of Rimu Street in Inglewood to rejoin SH 3.

== Major junctions ==
Territorial authority	Location	km	mi	Destinations	Notes
Hamilton City	Melville	0	0.0	SH 1C north (Kahikatea Drive) – Auckland; SH 1C south (Lorne Street) – Rotorua	SH 3 begins
Hamilton City	Melville	1	0.62	(Normandy Ave) – City Centre, Rotorua	to SH 1/Thermal Explorer Highway south
Waipa District	Hamilton Airport	10	6.2	SH 21 (Airport Road) – Airport, Mystery Creek	
Ōtorohanga District	Ōtorohanga	55	34	SH 31 / SH 39 (Te Kanawa Street) – Kawhia, Ngāruawāhia	
Waitomo District	Hangatiki	65	40	SH 37 (Waitomo Caves Road) – Waitomo Caves	
Waitomo District	Te Kūiti	76	47	SH 30 (Awakino Road) – Rotorua	
Waitomo District	Eight Mile Junction	88	55	SH 4 – Taumarunui	
New Plymouth District	Brixton	229	142	SH 3A (Mountain Road) – Inglewood	
New Plymouth District	New Plymouth Central	240	150	SH 44 (Eliot Street) – Port Taranaki; SH 45 (Leach Street) – City Centre, Ōpunake	
New Plymouth District	Inglewood	258	160	SH 3A (Rata Street) – Hamilton	
Stratford District	Stratford	279	173	SH 43 (Regan Street) – Taumarunui	
South Taranaki District	Hāwera	310	190	SH 45 (South Road) – Ōpunake	
Whanganui District	Putiki	402	250	SH 4 (Putiki Drive) – City Centre, National Park	
Rangitikei District	Bulls	445	277	SH 1 north (High Street) – Taupō	SH 1/SH 3 concurrency begins
Manawatū District	Sanson	450	280	SH 1 south (Wellington Road) – Wellington	SH 1/SH 3 concurrency ends
Manawatū District / Palmerston North City boundary	Newbury	468	291	SH 54 (Kairanga Bunnythorpe Road) – Feilding	
Palmerston North City	Ashhurst	487	303	(Cambridge Avenue) – Town Centre, Feilding, Woodville	
Palmerston North City	Ashhurst	488	303	SH 57 (Fitzherbert East Road) – Levin	
Tararua District	Woodville	498	309	(Woodlands Road / Saddle Road) – Ashhurst	
Tararua District	Woodville	500	310	SH 2 north (Vogel Street) – Napier; SH 2 south (McLean Street) – Masterton	SH 3 ends
Closed/former; Concurrency terminus

== See also ==
- Public transport in Hamilton and Waikato
