= North Taranaki Bight =

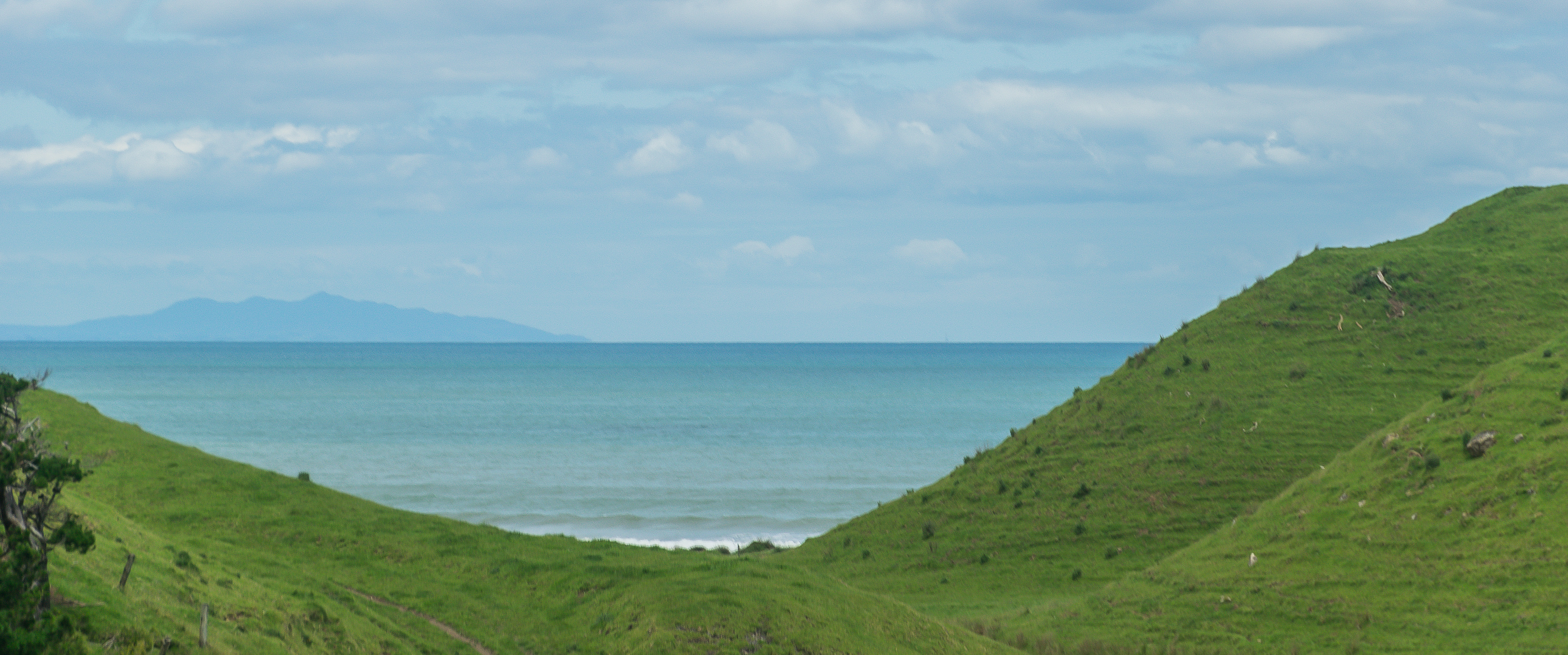
- View of the North Taranaki Bight at Mohakatino
- Interactive map of North Taranaki Bight
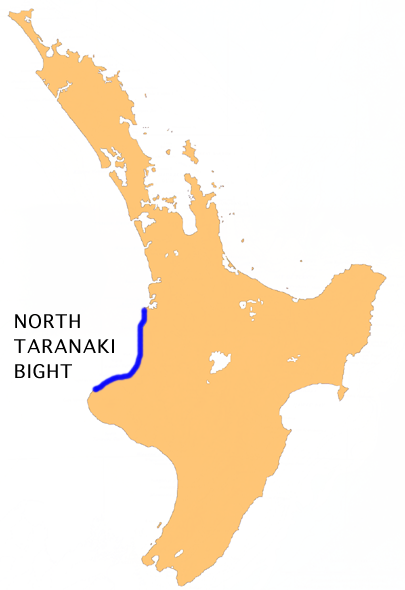
- Location of North Taranaki Bight
- Location: North Island
- Coordinates: 38°42′S 174°15′E
- Type: Bay
- Part of: Tasman Sea
- Basin countries: New Zealand

The North Taranaki Bight is a large bay that extends north and east from the north coast of Taranaki in New Zealand's North Island. The name is echoed by the South Taranaki Bight to the south of Cape Egmont.

As with its southern counterpart, the size of the bight depends to a large extent on the source referring to it. Strict definitions refer to it stretching from the mouth of the Waitara River, 10 kilometres northeast of New Plymouth, to the mouth of the Mokau River. Looser descriptions refer to it extending as far north as Tirua Point, 50 kilometres southwest of Te Kūiti, or even to Albatross Point, close to the entrance to Kawhia Harbour. Some include New Plymouth in the bight.

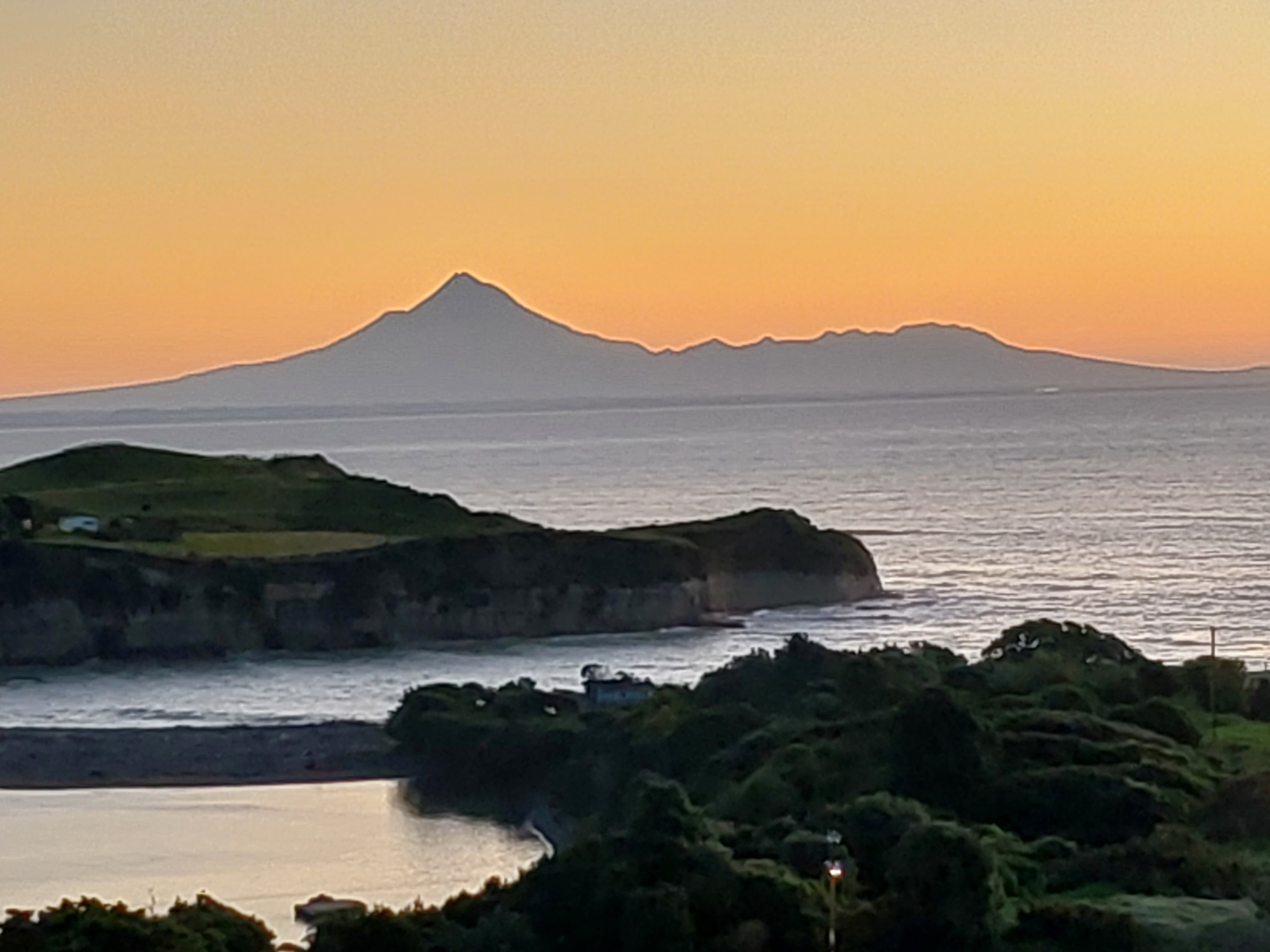
sunset at North Taranaki Bight

== See also ==
- South Taranaki Bight
