= Waitomo District Council =

Coordinates: 38.337406°S 175.1625446°E

Type
- Type: Unicameral of Waitomo District
- Houses: Governing Body
- Term limits: None

History
- Founded: 6 March 1989

Leadership
- Mayor: John Robertson
- Deputy mayor: Eady Manawaiti

Structure
- Seats: 7 seats (1 mayor, 6 ward seats)
- Length of term: 3 years

Website
- waitomo.govt.nz

Waitomo District Council is the territorial authority for the Waitomo District of New Zealand's North Island. It serves as the district's local government, with the Waikato Regional Council and Horizons Regional Council serving as the regional authorities. It has existed since the 1989 reforms to local government.

The council has 6 councillors and is chaired by the mayor of Waitomo (currently John Robertson since October 2019).

In 2026 5,977 were registered to vote in the District.

== Composition ==
=== Councillors ===
- Mayor John Robertson
- Te Kuiti ward: Eady Tanirau Manawaiti, Dan Tasker and Isaiah Wallace
- Rural ward: Olivia Buckley, Allan Goddard and Janette Osborne

== History ==
The area came under the authority of Awakino County Council and Waitomo County Council until 1922, Otorohanga County Council from 1922 to 1976, and previous Waitomo District Council entity from 1976 to 1989. The current council was established in 1989.

== Elections ==
- 1989
- 1992
- 1995
- 1998
- 2001
- 2004
- 2007
- 2010
- 2013
- 2016
- 2019
- 2022
- 2025
