= Mayor of Waitomo =

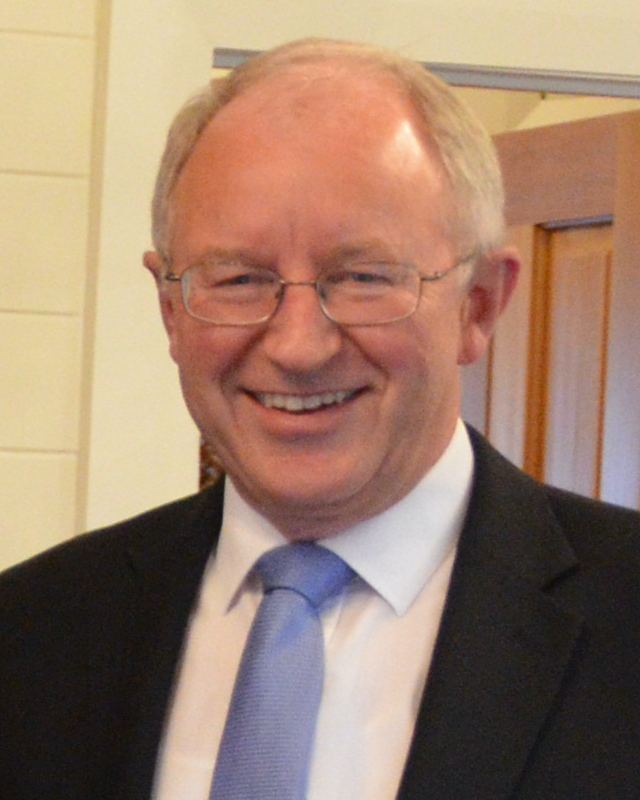
- Incumbent; John Robertson since 2019
- Style: His/Her Worship
- Term length: Three years, renewable
- Inaugural holder: Les Munro
- Formation: 1989
- Deputy: Eady Manawaiti
- Salary: $115,856
- Website: Official website

The mayor of Waitomo officiates over the Waitomo District Council.

John Robertson is the current mayor of Waitomo. He was elected mayor in 2019.

== List of mayors ==
Mayor	Portrait	Term of office
Les Munro		1980–1995
Wallace Bain		1995–1998
Steve Parry		1998–2001
Mark Ammon		2001–2010
Brian Hanna		2010–2019
John Robertson		2019–present
