= Waitomo District =

- Territorial authority district
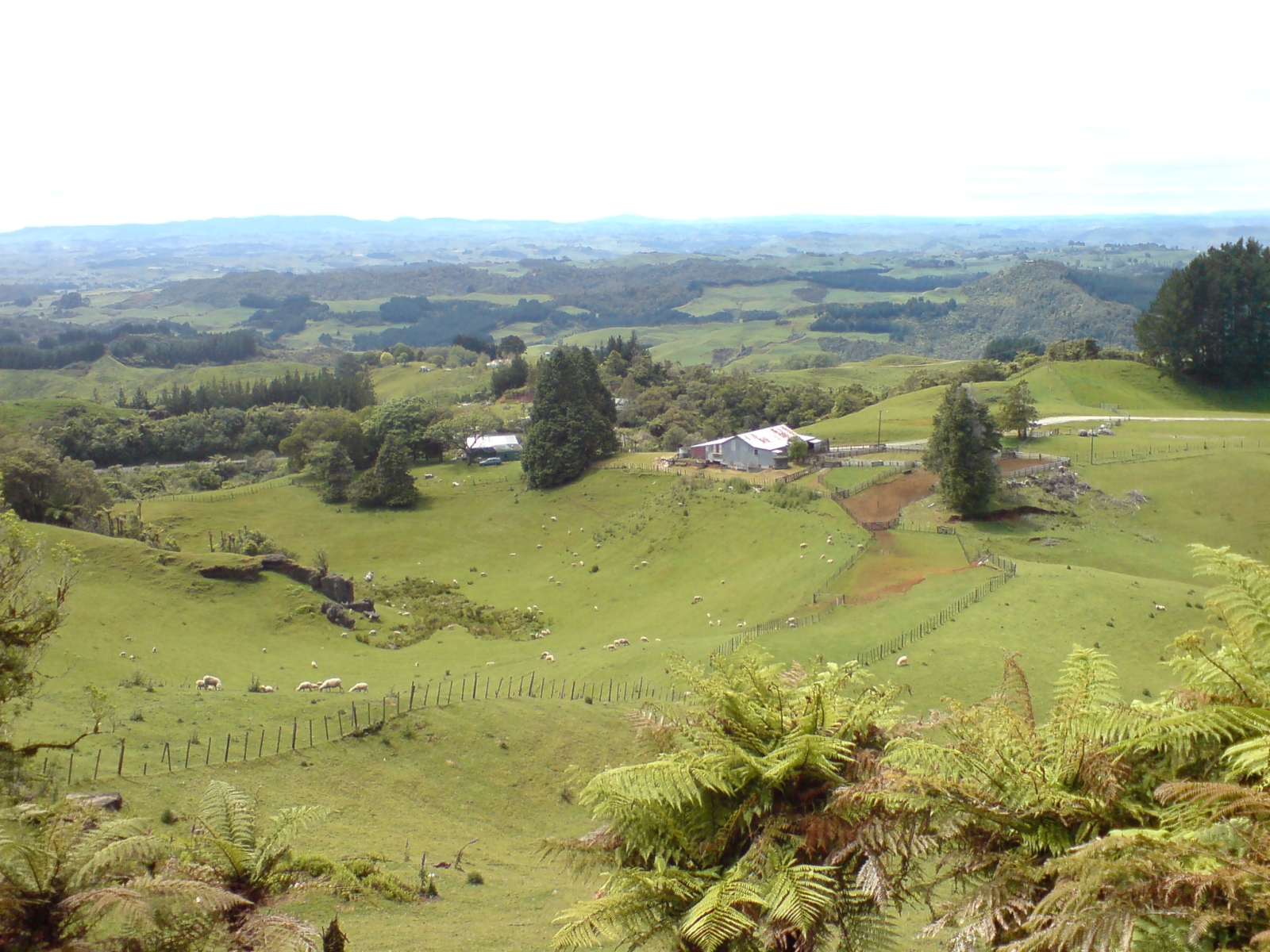

- Waitomo district within the North Island
- Coordinates: 38°21′S 175°11′E
- Country: New Zealand
- Region: Waikato region
- Wards: Te Kuiti Ward; Waitomo Rural Ward
- Seat: Te Kūiti

Government
  - Mayor: John Robertson
  - Deputy Mayor: Guy Whitaker
  - Territorial authority: Waitomo District Council

Area
  - Land: 3,534.84 km^{2} (1,364.81 sq mi)

Population (June 2025)
  - Total: 9,950
  - Density: 2.81/km^{2} (7.29/sq mi)
- Time zone: UTC+12 (NZST)
  - Summer (DST): UTC+13 (NZDT)
- Postcode(s): Map of postcodes
- Website: waitomo.govt.nz

Waitomo District is a territorial authority, located in the Waikato region, at the north of the King Country area in the North Island of New Zealand. A small part of the district, the locality of Tiroa, however, lies in the Manawatū-Whanganui region.

The District covers the west coast from Te Maika, on Kawhia Harbour, to the north of Taharoa, to Mokau in the south and extends inland to Maniaiti / Benneydale and Mount Pureora.

== Demographics ==
Waitomo District covers 3,534.84 km^{2} (1,364.81 sq mi) and had an estimated population of 9,950 as of June 2025, with a population density of 2.8 people per km^{2}.

Historical population
Year	Pop.	±% p.a.
2006	9,438	—
2013	8,907	−0.82%
2018	9,303	+0.87%
2023	9,585	+0.60%

Waitomo District had a population of 9,585 in the 2023 New Zealand census, an increase of 282 people (3.0%) since the 2018 census, and an increase of 678 people (7.6%) since the 2013 census. There were 4,845 males, 4,722 females and 21 people of other genders in 3,588 dwellings. 1.8% of people identified as LGBTIQ+. The median age was 39.4 years (compared with 38.1 years nationally). There were 2,022 people (21.1%) aged under 15 years, 1,668 (17.4%) aged 15 to 29, 4,197 (43.8%) aged 30 to 64, and 1,698 (17.7%) aged 65 or older.

People could identify as more than one ethnicity. The results were 62.6% European (Pākehā); 45.3% Māori; 4.4% Pasifika; 5.0% Asian; 0.4% Middle Eastern, Latin American and African New Zealanders (MELAA); and 2.6% other, which includes people giving their ethnicity as "New Zealander". English was spoken by 96.4%, Māori language by 12.0%, Samoan by 1.1% and other languages by 5.2%. No language could be spoken by 2.3% (e.g. too young to talk). New Zealand Sign Language was known by 0.7%. The percentage of people born overseas was 11.3, compared with 28.8% nationally.

Religious affiliations were 28.2% Christian, 0.8% Hindu, 0.8% Islam, 4.6% Māori religious beliefs, 0.5% Buddhist, 0.6% New Age, 0.1% Jewish, and 0.7% other religions. People who answered that they had no religion were 56.1%, and 8.1% of people did not answer the census question.

Of those at least 15 years old, 759 (10.0%) people had a bachelor's or higher degree, 4,152 (54.9%) had a post-high school certificate or diploma, and 2,448 (32.4%) people exclusively held high school qualifications. The median income was $35,600, compared with $41,500 nationally. 438 people (5.8%) earned over $100,000 compared to 12.1% nationally. The employment status of those at least 15 was that 3,792 (50.1%) people were employed full-time, 1,020 (13.5%) were part-time, and 270 (3.6%) were unemployed.

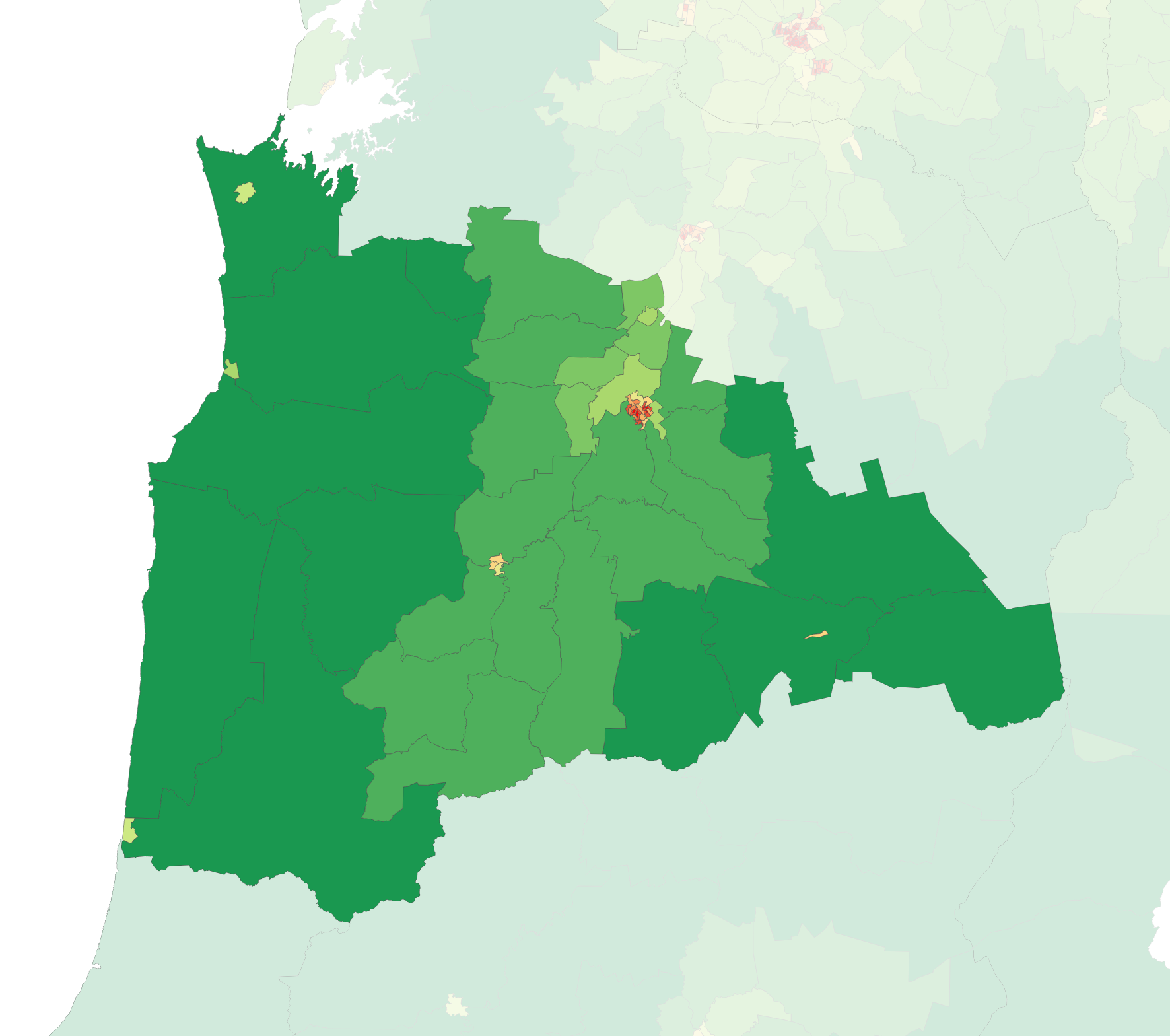
Population density in the 2023 census

Individual wards
Name	Area (km^{2})	Population	Density (per km^{2})	Dwellings	Median age	Median income
Waitomo Rural Ward	3,530.06	5,019	1.4	1,977	41.5 years	$38,700
Te Kuiti Ward	4.78	4,566	955.2	1,608	37.3 years	$31,700
New Zealand					38.1 years	$41,500

== District council ==
The seat of the Waitomo District Council is at Te Kūiti, which had a population of 4,850 in June 2025. No other village in the district has a population of over 500. The district has a land area of 3,534.84 km^{2} (1,365 sq mi), 94.87% of which lies in the Waikato Region and only 5.13% in the Manawatu-Wanganui Region. The Waitomo district was declared in 1976. The current district mayor is John Robertson, who defeated incumbent Brian Hanna in the 2019 New Zealand local elections.

== Economy ==
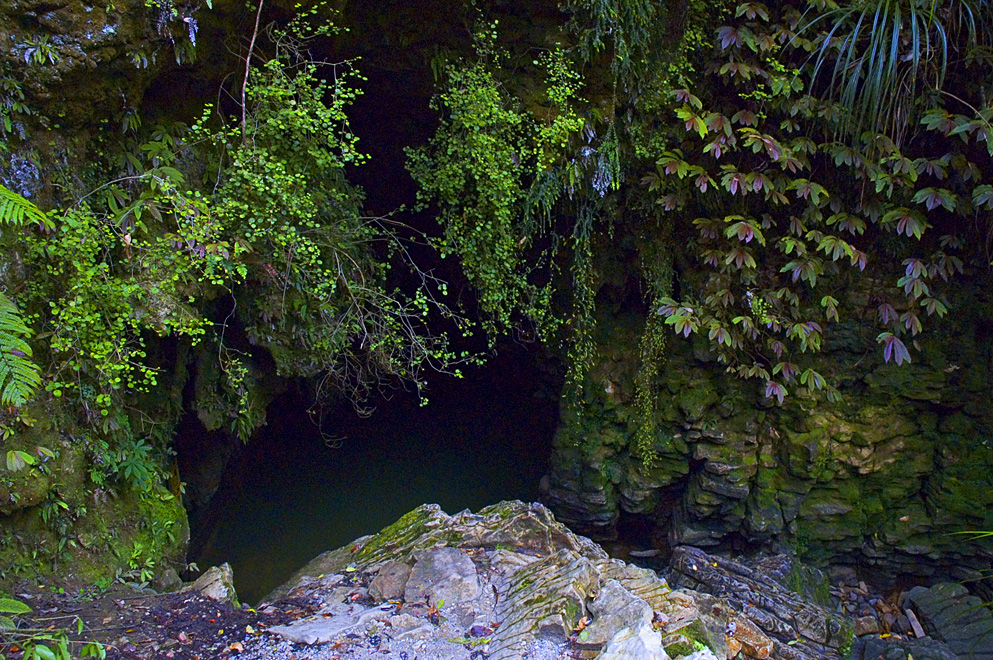
A cave entrance in the Waitomo District which is known for its limestone caves.

The district is a rural, predominantly dairy farming, region. The area's main industries include sheep farming, forestry, and limestone quarrying. The area is known for its many limestone caves including the popular Waitomo Glowworm Cave, a karstic system with stalactites, stalagmites and glowworms 12 kilometres northwest of Te Kūiti. Waitomo also has an Edwardian hotel, built in 1908 and added onto in the 1930s. The hotel overlooks the Waitomo Caves village.

== Attractions ==
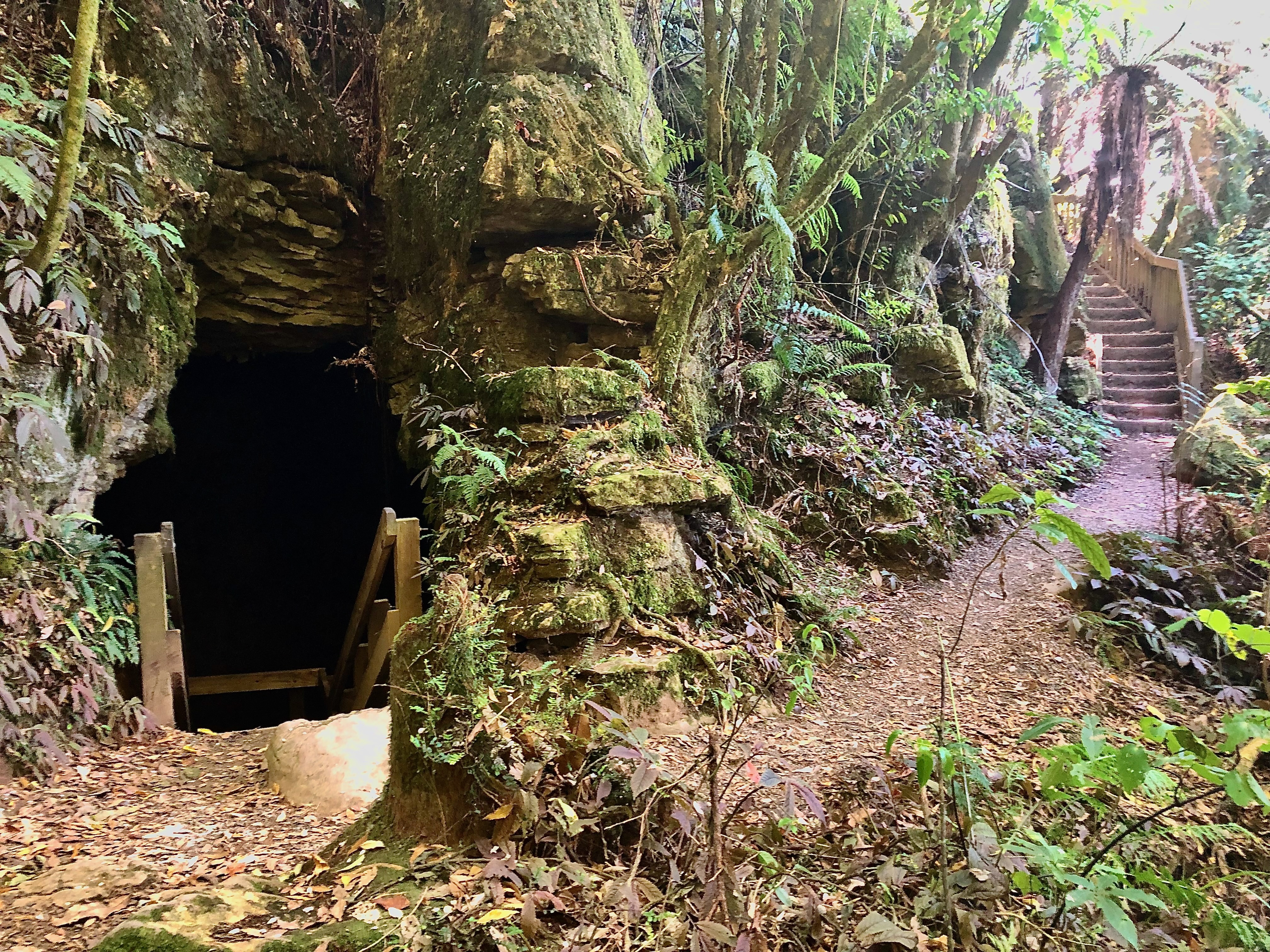
Piripiri cave entrance

Te Anga Road, a winding road from State Highway 3 in the Marokopa River area, leads past the Waitomo Glowworm Cave, Mangapohue Natural Bridge, Piripiri Caves, and Marokopa Falls. Numerous other limestone caves are found throughout the Waitomo district.
