= Electoral history of Jim Bolger =

List of elections featuring Jim Bolger as a candidate

This is a summary of the electoral history of Jim Bolger, Prime Minister of New Zealand (1990–97), Leader of the National Party (1986–97), and Member of Parliament for King Country (1972–96) then Taranaki-King Country (1996–97).

== Parliamentary elections ==
=== 1972 election ===
General election, 1972: King Country
Party	Candidate	Votes	%	±%
National	Jim Bolger	7,107	48.0	
Labour	Brent Clifton Sakey	5,867	39.6	
Social Credit	Derek Mason	1,351	9.1	
Liberal Reform	Saxby John Telfer	191	1.3	
Independent	Richard Alan Soundy	185	1.3	
New Democratic	John William Norman	111	0.7	
Majority		1,240	8.4	
Turnout		17,014	87.5	

=== 1975 election ===
General election, 1975: King Country
Party	Candidate	Votes	%	±%
National	Jim Bolger	9,180	56.1	+8.1
Labour	Thomas David Varnham	4,864	29.8	
Social Credit	Derek Mason	1,759	10.8	+1.7
Values	Richard Louis Osborn	546	3.3	
Majority		4,316	26.3	+17.9
Turnout		20,440	80.3	−7.2

=== 1978 election ===
General election, 1978: King Country
Party	Candidate	Votes	%	±%
National	Jim Bolger	6,804	44.6	−11.5
Labour	Leo Menfy	4,034	26.5	
Social Credit	Derek Mason	3,997	26.2	+15.4
Values	R Azariah	409	2.7	
Majority		2,770	18.1	−8.2
Turnout		23,726	64.5	−15.8

=== 1981 election ===
General election, 1981: King Country
Party	Candidate	Votes	%	±%
National	Jim Bolger	7,937	49.1	+4.5
Social Credit	Derek Mason	5,779	35.7	+9.2
Labour	Pai Tahere	2,460	15.2	
Majority		2,158	13.4	−4.7
Turnout		18,878	86.0	+21.5

=== 1984 election ===
General election, 1984: King Country
Party	Candidate	Votes	%	±%
National	Jim Bolger	10,040	55.1	+6.0
Labour	James Edward Simons	4,423	24.3	
Social Credit	Derek Mason	2,027	11.1	−24.6
NZ Party	Graham Short	1,580	8.7	
Values	Peter Winter	139	0.8	
Majority		5,617	30.8	+17.4
Turnout		20,477	91.0	+5.0

=== 1987 election ===
General election, 1987: King Country
Party	Candidate	Votes	%	±%
National	Jim Bolger	10,942	64.2	+9.1
Labour	Leo Menfy	4,988	29.3	
Democrats	Wayne Campbell Robert Morris	1,115	6.5	
Majority		5,954	34.9	+4.1
Turnout		20,143	86.4	−4.6

=== 1990 election ===
General election, 1990: King Country
Party	Candidate	Votes	%	±%
National	Jim Bolger	10,406	64.4	+0.2
Labour	Cameron Gordon	3,132	19.4	
Green	Laurence Cadman	1,368	8.4	
NewLabour	Dion Martin	497	3.0	
Social Credit	Mervyn Williamson	496	3.0	
McGillicuddy Serious	Craig Louis Simmons	107	0.6	
Democrats	Steven Wilton	77	0.4	
Imperial British Conservative	Kate McDonald	53		
Majority		7,274	45.0	+10.1
Turnout		16,136		

=== 1993 election ===
General election, 1993: King Country
Party	Candidate	Votes	%	±%
National	Jim Bolger	8,396	51.8	−12.6
Labour	Murray Simpson	3,890	24.0	
Alliance	Ian Herbert	3,518	21.7	
Christian Heritage	Mark Anthony Jones	539	3.3	
McGillicuddy Serious	Anand Hasyo	220	1.3	
Natural Law	Euan Frederick Williams	115	0.7	
Majority		4,506	27.8	−17.2
Turnout		16,678		

=== 1996 election ===
General election, 1996: Taranaki-King Country
Party	Candidate	Votes	%	±%
National	Jim Bolger	14,934	54.0	
NZ First	Robin Ord	4,711	17.0	
Labour	Peter Calvert	3,575	12.9	
Alliance	Kevin Campbell	2,560	9.2	
ACT	Trevor Johnson	902	3.2	
McGillicuddy Serious	Anand Hasyo	288	1.0	
Independent	Brett Power	209	0.7	
Natural Law	Joanna Greig	101	0.3	
Mana Māori	Jackie Amohanga	74	0.2	
Majority		10,223	37.0	
Turnout		27,611		

== Leadership elections ==
=== 1981 deputy leadership election ===
First ballot

Name	Votes	Percentage
Derek Quigley	23	46.00%
Duncan MacIntyre	20	40.00%
Jim Bolger	7	14.00%

Second ballot

Name	Votes	Percentage
Duncan MacIntyre	26	52.00%
Derek Quigley	24	48.00%

=== 1984 deputy leadership election ===
Name	Votes	Percentage
Jim McLay	25	53.19%
Jim Bolger	15	31.91%
Bill Birch	7	14.89%

=== 1984 leadership election ===
Name	Votes	Percentage
Jim McLay	22	62.85%
Jim Bolger	8	22.85%
Robert Muldoon	5	14.28%

=== 1986 leadership election ===
Name	Votes	Percentage
Jim Bolger	25	65.78%
Jim McLay	13	34.22%
