= Joan Bolger =

Wife of New Zealand prime minister Jim Bolger

Joan Bolger CNZM
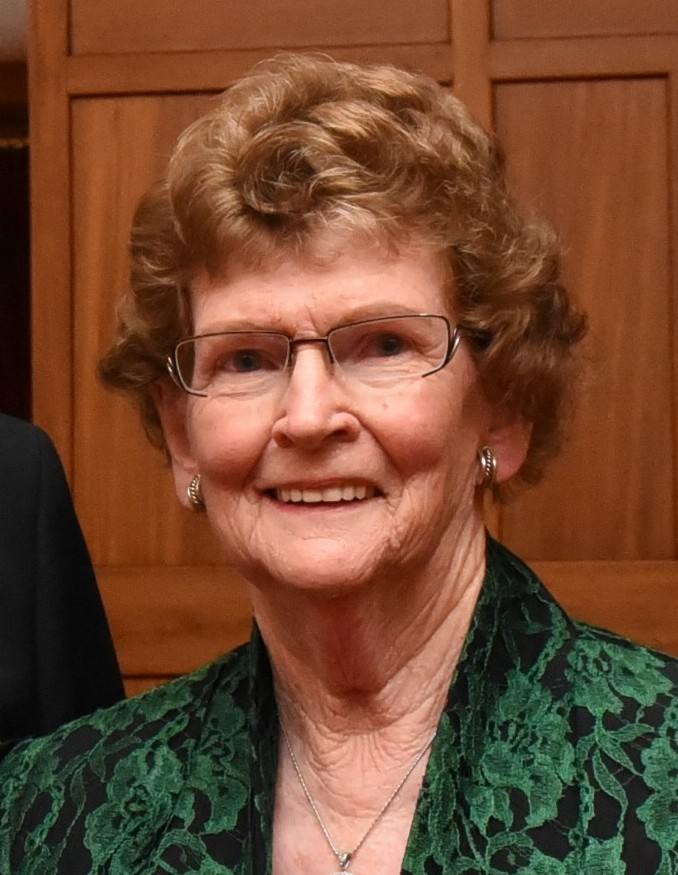
- Bolger in 2018

Spouse of the Prime Minister of New Zealand
- In role 2 November 1990 – 8 December 1997
- Prime Minister: Jim Bolger
- Preceded by: Yvonne Moore
- Succeeded by: Burton Shipley

Personal details
- Born: Joan Maureen Riddell; 1942 (age 83–84)
- Spouse: Jim Bolger (m. 1963; died 2025)
- Children: 9
- Known for: Community service; wife of prime minister

Joan Maureen Bolger CNZM (née Riddell; born 1942) is a New Zealand community leader. She is the widow of Jim Bolger, who served as the prime minister of New Zealand between 1990 and 1997.

== Biography ==
Bolger was born Joan Maureen Riddell in 1942. She trained and qualified as a schoolteacher, before marrying Jim Bolger at Pungarehu on 25 May 1963. The couple went on to have nine children.

During the early years of her husband's political career, Bolger was mainly involved in raising the couple's children, and looking after the family home and farm near Te Kūiti. As the children grew and her husband climbed the political ladder, she began to take an increasing role in public life. Initially, she carried out National Party duties in her husband's King Country electorate in his absence, but later became more involved in party affairs nationally as her husband became party leader, leader of the Opposition and eventually prime minister in 1990. As the wife of the prime minister, she frequently accompanied her husband on official visits abroad and carried out many official duties. She also found herself in demand as a public speaker, often giving talks about her overseas trips and the human side of human relations, and used her position to do charitable work. An active Catholic parishioner, Bolger gave talks to church groups, such as in 1992 where she spoke to the Christchurch division conference of the Catholic Women's League about the role of women as peacemakers.

During the 1993 general election campaign, Bolger had a melanoma removed, but returned to campaigning within two days.

In 1997, Bolger formally commissioned the frigate HMNZS Te Kaha into the Royal New Zealand Navy. Later that year, she accompanied the Māori Queen, Dame Te Atairangikaahu, to a conference on moral re-armament in Switzerland, where they both spoke in a private capacity about the Treaty of Waitangi settlement process.

Bolger accompanied her husband in Washington, D.C. during his tenure there as New Zealand's ambassador to the United States between 1998 and 2002.

Since 2013, the Bolgers have lived in Waikanae.

== Honours and awards ==
In 1990, Bolger was awarded the New Zealand 1990 Commemoration Medal, and three years later she received the New Zealand Suffrage Centennial Medal. In the 1998 New Year Honours, she was appointed a Companion of the New Zealand Order of Merit, for services to the community.
