= Jim Bolger =

Prime Minister of New Zealand from 1990 to 1997

The Right Honourable Jim Bolger ONZ
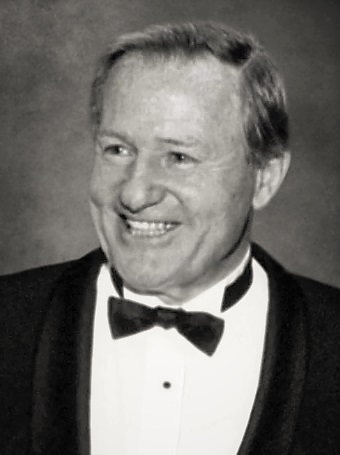
- Bolger in 1992

35th Prime Minister of New Zealand
- In office 2 November 1990 – 8 December 1997
- Monarch: Elizabeth II
- Governors-General: Paul Reeves; Catherine Tizard; Michael Hardie Boys
- Deputy: Don McKinnon; Winston Peters
- Preceded by: Mike Moore
- Succeeded by: Jenny Shipley

11th Chancellor of the University of Waikato
- In office 14 February 2007 – 6 August 2019
- Preceded by: John Jackman
- Succeeded by: Anand Satyanand

14th New Zealand Ambassador to the United States
- In office 10 September 1998 – 25 January 2002
- Prime Minister: Jenny Shipley
- Preceded by: John Wood
- Succeeded by: John Wood
Senior political offices
25th Leader of the Opposition
In office 26 March 1986 – 2 November 1990
Monarch	Elizabeth II
Prime Minister	David Lange; Geoffrey Palmer; Mike Moore
Deputy	George Gair; Don McKinnon
Preceded by	Jim McLay
Succeeded by	Mike Moore
7th Leader of the National Party
In office 26 March 1986 – 8 December 1997
Deputy	George Gair; Don McKinnon
Preceded by	Jim McLay
Succeeded by	Jenny Shipley
Ministerial offices held
27th Minister of Labour
In office 13 December 1978 – 26 July 1984
Prime Minister	Robert Muldoon
Preceded by	Peter Gordon
Succeeded by	Stan Rodger
39th Minister of Immigration
In office 13 December 1978 – 12 February 1981
Prime Minister	Robert Muldoon
Preceded by	Frank Gill
Succeeded by	Aussie Malcolm
1st Minister of Fisheries
In office 8 March 1977 – 13 December 1978
Prime Minister	Robert Muldoon
Succeeded by	Duncan MacIntyre

Member of the New Zealand Parliament for Taranaki-King Country King Country (1972–1996)
- In office 25 November 1972 – 6 April 1998
- Succeeded by: Shane Ardern

Personal details
- Born: James Brendan Bolger; 31 May 1935 Ōpunake, New Zealand
- Died: 15 October 2025 (aged 90) Wellington, New Zealand
- Party: National
- Spouse: Joan Riddell (m. 1963)
- Children: 9
- Occupation: Politician; diplomat; farmer

James Brendan Bolger ONZ PC (/ˈbɒldʒər/ BOL-jər; 31 May 1935 – 15 October 2025) was a New Zealand politician, diplomat, and farmer who served as the 35th prime minister of New Zealand from 1990 to 1997. A member of the New Zealand National Party, he served as the party's leader from 1986 to 1997, and was Leader of the Opposition from 1986 to 1990. He later served as the 14th New Zealand ambassador to the United States from 1998 to 2002, and as the 11th chancellor of the University of Waikato from 2007 to 2019.

Bolger was born in Ōpunake, Taranaki, to Irish immigrants. Before entering politics, he farmed in Waikato, and was involved in Federated Farmers—a nationwide agricultural association. Bolger won election to Parliament in 1972, and subsequently served in several portfolios in the Third National Government. Following one unsuccessful bid for the party leadership in 1984, Bolger was elected as National Party leader in 1986, and thus became Leader of the Opposition.

Bolger led the National Party to a landslide victory—the largest in its history—in the 1990 election, leading him to become prime minister in November. The Fourth National Government was elected on the promise of delivering a "Decent Society" following the previous Labour government's economic reforms, known as "Rogernomics", which Bolger criticised. However, shortly after taking office, his government was forced to bail out the Bank of New Zealand and as a result reneged on many promises made during the election campaign. Bolger's government essentially advanced the free-market reforms of the previous government, while implementing drastic cuts in public spending. National retained power in the 1993 election, albeit with a much-reduced majority.

Bolger's second term in office saw the introduction of the MMP electoral system. In the subsequent 1996 election, National emerged as the largest party, but it was forced to enter into a coalition with New Zealand First. Bolger continued as prime minister; however, his critics argued that he gave the inexperienced NZ First too much influence in his Cabinet. In December 1997, Bolger was effectively ousted as leader by his party caucus, and was replaced as prime minister by Jenny Shipley.

After resigning from Parliament and thus retiring from politics 1998, Bolger was appointed New Zealand Ambassador to the United States by Prime Minister Shipley, a role he served until 2002. In February 2007, Bolger was elected Chancellor of the University of Waikato and served in the role until his retirement in 2019.

== Early life ==
James Brendan Bolger was born on 31 May 1935 at Ōpunake in Taranaki. He was born into an Irish Catholic family; Bolger was one of five children born to Daniel and Cecilia (née Doyle) Bolger who emigrated together from Gorey, County Wexford, in 1930. He said that his early childhood was dominated by the effects of World War II. He left Opunake High School at age 15 to work on the family dairy farm. In 1962 he purchased his own farm near Rahotu. He joined and became active in Federated Farmers, becoming a branch chairman in 1962, sub-provincial chairman in 1970 and Waikato provincial vice-president in 1971. He was a member of the Waikato and King Country agricultural advisory committees.

In 1963, Bolger married Joan Riddell, and they moved to their own sheep and beef farm in Te Kūiti two years later. During this time Bolger became involved in local farmer politics. He joined the Egmont branch of the National Party and was later an officeholder in the Te Kūiti branch. In the late 1960s he was asked to accompany the then Minister of Finance Robert Muldoon to see for himself the difficulties faced by farmers in the area. As Bolger travelled around the district, he became experienced with Muldoon's adversarial style.

== Political career ==
=== Member of Parliament ===
New Zealand Parliament
Years	Term	Electorate	List	Party
1972–1975	37th	King Country		National
1975–1978	38th	King Country		National
1978–1981	39th	King Country		National
1981–1984	40th	King Country		National
1984–1987	41st	King Country		National
1987–1990	42nd	King Country		National
1990–1993	43rd	King Country		National
1993–1996	44th	King Country		National
1996–1998	45th	Taranaki-King Country	1	National

Bolger entered politics in 1972 as the New Zealand National Party Member of Parliament for King Country, a newly created electorate in the rural western portion of North Island. This electorate is traditional National territory, and Bolger won easily. He represented this electorate, renamed Taranaki-King Country in 1996, until his retirement in 1998. In 1974 he was appointed National's spokesperson for Rural Affairs by incoming leader Robert Muldoon.

At the formation of the Third National Government in 1975 Bolger was designated as Parliamentary Under-Secretary to the Minister of Agriculture and Fisheries and to Minister of Maori Affairs. In 1977, Muldoon promoted him to Cabinet, first as Minister of Fisheries and Associate Minister of Agriculture. Following the 1978 election, he became Minister of Labour and Minister of Immigration.

In late 1980 Bolger was a leading member of 'the Colonels' (alongside Derek Quigley, Jim McLay and George Gair) who attempted to dump Muldoon as leader and put the party back into line with traditional National Party policies after feeling they were being abandoned. In what became known as the Colonels' Coup. The agitators intended to replace Muldoon with his deputy, Brian Talboys, who was more economically liberal and in tune with traditional National Party philosophy than Muldoon. The Colonels waited until Muldoon was out of the country before moving against him. However, Talboys was reluctant to openly challenge and the scheme failed with Muldoon reaffirming control after he returned to remain leader.

After the defeat of National at the 1984 general elections Bolger remained on the frontbench as Shadow Minister of Labour and Employment. Both he and deputy leader Jim McLay challenged Muldoon for the leadership of the party. McLay succeeded but Bolger was elected as deputy leader (and hence Deputy Leader of the Opposition). McLay also designated Bolger Shadow Minister of Trade and Industry before switching him to Shadow Minister of Agriculture. In December 1985 he attempted an abortive leadership coup against McLay.

=== Leader of the Opposition ===
In 1986, Bolger organised a second challenge to McLay's leadership. This one was successful, and he defeated McLay in a 26 March 1986 ballot for the leadership of the National Party. Initially Bolger pursued a pro law and order approach, with a focus on critiquing Labour's perceived reluctance to combat "lawlessness" and offering a referendum on the reintroduction of capital punishment.

Bolger went head to head against the popular David Lange in the 1987 general election, but failed to match the latter's popularity; Lange described Bolger as "an itinerant masseur, massaging the politically erogenous zones." National under Bolger capitalised on public anger at the Labour government's highly unpopular economic policies to win National's biggest ever majority (and by extension the largest in New Zealand history) at the 1990 general election. Bolger became Prime Minister at age 55.

== Premiership (1990–1997) ==
- Premiership of Jim Bolger; 2 November 1990 – 8 December 1997
- Monarch: Elizabeth II
- Cabinet: Fourth National Government of New Zealand
- Party: New Zealand National Party
- Election: 1990, 1993, 1996
- Appointed by: Paul Reeves
- Seat: Premier House

=== First term ===
Bolger with European Commission president Jacques Delors (right from behind), October 1991

Three days after being sworn in as prime minister on 5 November 1990, Bolger's government needed to bail out the Bank of New Zealand, then the largest bank in the country. The cost of the bail out was $380 million, but after rewriting its budget, the government needed to borrow $740 million. This had an immediate impact on Bolger's direction in government, with the first budget of his premiership being dubbed the "Mother of all Budgets". Bolger's finance minister, Ruth Richardson, implemented drastic cuts in public spending, particularly in health and welfare. The unemployment benefit was cut by $14.00 a week, sickness benefit by $27.04, families benefit by $25.00 to $27.00 and universal payments for family benefits were completely abolished. Richardson also introduced many user pays requirements in hospitals and schools, services previously free to the populace and paid for by the government. The first budget specifically reversed National's election promise to remove the tax surcharge on superannuation and the retention of promises to abolish tertiary fees.

Another major controversial piece of legislation was the 1991 Employment Contracts Act which effectively dismantled the industrial relations settlement that had persisted since 1894. Immediate effects of this law change saw union membership fall dramatically in the decade following its passage. His government also introduced the Building Act 1991, which is seen by some as a crucial factor leading to New Zealand's later leaky homes crisis.

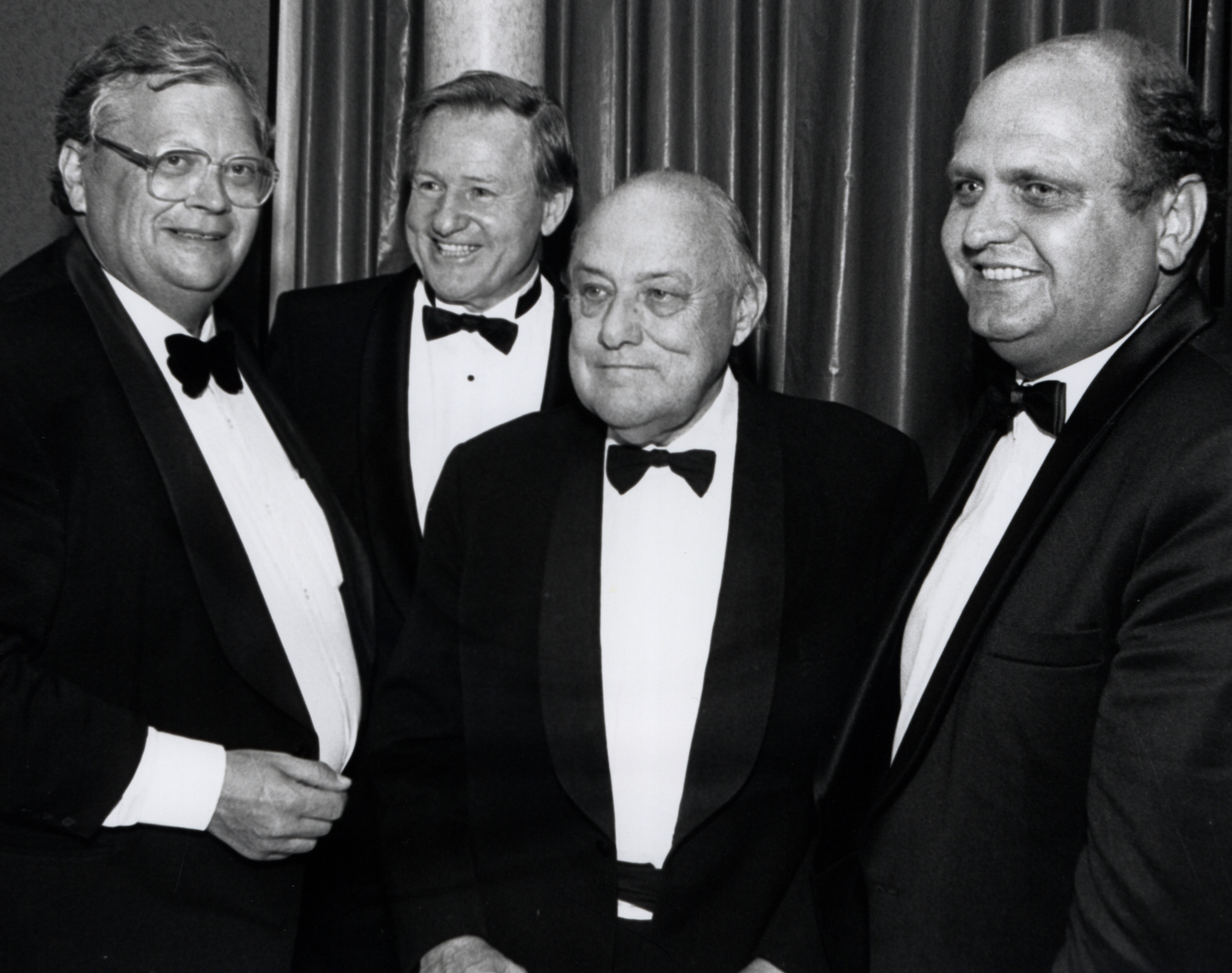
Bolger (second to left) with three former New Zealand prime ministers in 1992 (left to right): David Lange, Robert Muldoon, and Mike Moore

Bolger opposed electoral reform, but despite his party's opposition held a referendum on whether or not New Zealand should change from the British-style electoral system of 'first past the post' to one of proportional representation. In 1992, New Zealanders voted to change to the Mixed Member Proportional (MMP) system. This was confirmed in a binding referendum held alongside the 1993 general election, which National won. Bolger had originally proposed a return to a bicameral system, with a Senate elected by Single Transferable Vote, but retreated from this in the face of support for electoral reform. For his pragmatism and his sense of authority, he was jovially nicknamed "The Great Helmsman".

Bolger was embroiled in the 1992 election campaign in the Australian state of Victoria when the ruling Australian Labor Party ran ads stating that if the opposition Liberals won the election it would institute the same policies that were implemented in New Zealand by the Fourth National Government led by Bolger. He responded in reference to the campaign, "You know, they say that the show’s never over until the fat lady sings. Well, I think it was her we heard warming up in the wings this week". The "fat lady" was in reference to Victorian Premier Joan Kirner being overweight. Bolger refused to apologise for this remark citing that he himself was overweight and did not want to make "an international incident" out of it. It did, however, anger women from Bolger's own National Party.

=== Second term ===
Bolger (far left) with other APEC leaders during the 1993 APEC summit in Seattle, November 1993

At the 1993 election, National narrowly retained government, owing partly to a slight economic recovery and his opposition being split between three competing parties; Bolger himself expected a comfortable election win, exclaiming "bugger the pollsters" upon the election result. National's unprecedented eighteen-seat majority had virtually disappeared and the country faced an election night hung parliament for the first time since 1931, with National one seat short of the required 50 seats to govern. Final special votes counted over the following days revealed National had retained Waitaki which it had lost on election night together with holding Wellington-Karori the only electorate National had won from Labour. This allowed it to form a government with the majority of one seat but required the election of a Speaker from the opposition benches (Peter Tapsell of the Labour Party) to hold a working majority in the House.

Following this election result Bolger expressed the need to work with other political parties and decided to demote Richardson from her post, appointing Bill Birch who was seen as more moderate. During Birch's tenure, spending on core areas such as health and education increased. His government passed the Fiscal Responsibility Act 1994. During the 1994 Address-in-Reply debate, Bolger argued in favour of a New Zealand republic, but denied that his views related to his Irish heritage.

In April 1995 the Cave Creek disaster gained public attention after a scenic viewing platform collapsed, killing fourteen people. The platform had been erected by the Department of Conservation (DOC) in 1994 and later inquiries found that many of those who constructed it did not have prerequisite qualifications for building the platform. Despite DOC taking responsibility for its collapse, there would be no prosecutions (as the Crown is unable to prosecute itself) but $2.6 million worth of compensation was paid to the victims' families. Bolger initially attacked the report produced by the Commission of Inquiry, arguing that the platform failed "essentially because it lacked about $20 worth of bolts to hold it together". The Minister of Conservation, Denis Marshall, was criticised in the media for his management of the department. Many people blamed Marshall, although there was also wide criticism of the whole government's policies on management of the conservation estate. Marshall eventually resigned in May 1996, just over a year after the accident occurred. A new Minister, Nick Smith, was appointed, and a full review of the department was conducted by the State Services Commission.

Bolger's second term would also see France resume nuclear testing on Moruroa, prompting swift condemnation from New Zealand and other Pacific nations. He vocally supported anti-nuclear protests by New Zealand yachters. His government dispatched HMNZS Tui to provide support for the flotilla.

Proposals to end the status of the Judicial Committee of the Privy Council as the country's highest court of appeal failed to gain parliamentary sanction during Bolger's premiership (however Helen Clark's Fifth Labour Government would replace the right of appeal in 2003 when it set up the Supreme Court of New Zealand). Bolger's government ended the awarding of British honours in 1996, introducing a New Zealand Honours System. At a conference on the his premiership in 2007, Bolger recalled speaking to the Queen about the issue of New Zealand becoming a republic: "I have more than once spoken with Her Majesty about my view that New Zealand would at some point elect its own Head of State, we discussed the matter in a most sensible way and she was in no way surprised or alarmed and neither did she cut my head off." With the new MMP environment some National Party MPs defected to a new grouping, United New Zealand in mid-1995, whilst other splinter parties emerged.

=== Third term ===
The 1996 election saw New Zealand First, led by former National minister Winston Peters, holding the balance of power after the 1996 election. Bolger's government stayed in office in a caretaker role while negotiations began for a coalition government. Although National remained the largest single party, neither Bolger nor Labour leader Helen Clark could form a government on their own. Neither party could govern without the support of New Zealand First, leaving Peters in a position where he could effectively choose the next prime minister.

Ultimately, in December 1996, Peters decided to go into coalition with National. Bolger had to pay a very high price to stay in power, however. As part of a detailed coalition agreement Peters became deputy prime minister and Treasurer. The latter post was created specifically for Peters, and was senior to the existing post of Minister of Finance, which was retained by Birch. Bolger also made significant policy concessions as well. He also allowed Peters full latitude to select ministers from New Zealand First, unusual for a junior coalition partner in a Westminster system. There were concerns about whether Bolger and Peters could work together, since Bolger had sacked Peters from his cabinet in 1991 over Peters' objections to Ruthanasia. However, no major issues surfaced between them.

Bolger's administration made progress in settling historical grievances with the Māori under the Treaty of Waitangi. These settlements aimed to address longstanding issues related to land and resource rights, contributing to the reconciliation process between the government and Māori communities.

=== Resignation ===
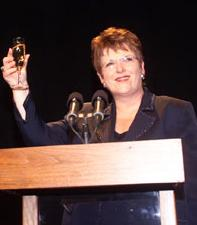
Jenny Shipley mounted a coup against Bolger in December 1997.

Growing opposition to Bolger's slow pace and the perceived exaggerated influence of New Zealand First led Transport Minister Jenny Shipley to plan a caucus room coup while Bolger was attending the Commonwealth Heads of Government Meeting. When Bolger returned to New Zealand, he found that Shipley was not only preparing a leadership challenge, but had marshaled enough support to oust him as party leader and prime minister. Rather than face being voted out, he resigned on 8 December, and Shipley became New Zealand's first woman prime minister. As a concession, Bolger was made a junior minister in Shipley's government.

Bolger remains the National Party's third-longest-serving leader. Retiring political journalist Peter Luke said that Bolger was "[t]he most under-estimated prime minister I have come across. He made up for his lack of education by having an innate ability to relate to the aspirations of ordinary Kiwis. And, as many civil servants discovered to their cost, his image of being a simple King Country farmer did not mean that he would not understand their reports and unfailingly point to the flaws in them."

== Life after politics ==
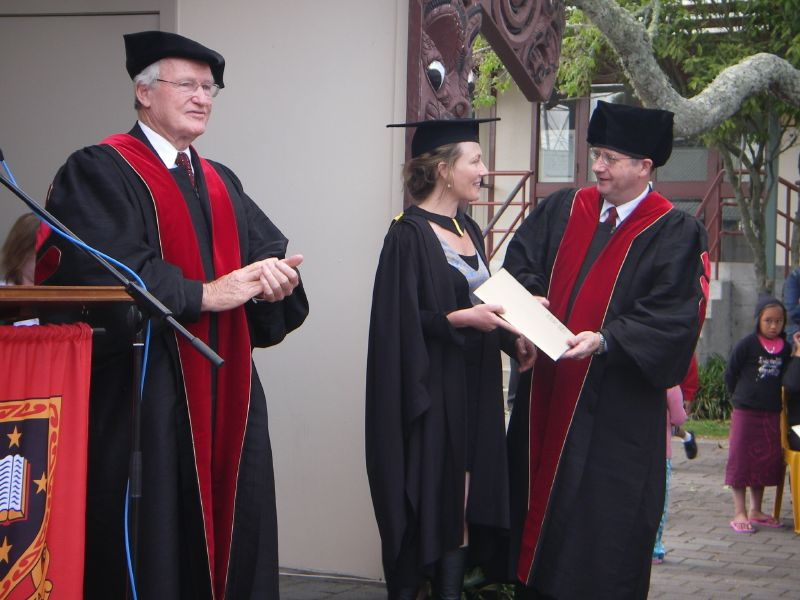
Bolger presides over a student's graduation at the University of Waikato, 2008.

Bolger retired as MP for Taranaki-King Country in 1998, prompting the 1998 by-election and subsequently became New Zealand's ambassador to the United States. On his return to New Zealand in 2001, he was appointed chairman of the state-owned New Zealand Post and of its subsidiary Kiwibank. He also chaired Express Couriers Ltd, Trustees Executors Ltd, the Gas Industry Company Ltd, the advisory board of the World Agricultural Forum, St. Louis, USA, the New Zealand United States Council, and the board of directors of the Ian Axford Fellowships in Public Policy.

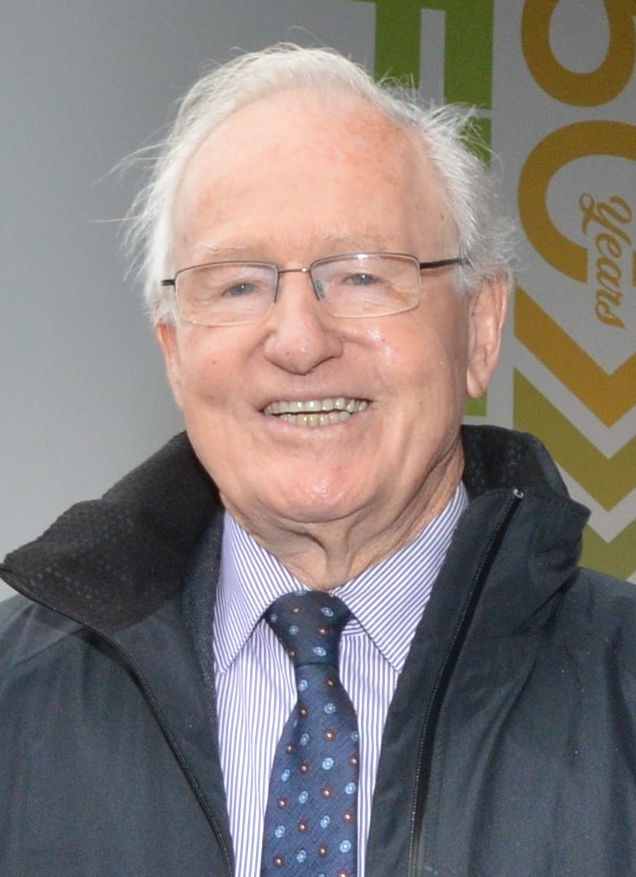
Bolger in 2018

Bolger was elected chancellor of the University of Waikato on 14 February 2007, succeeding John Jackman.

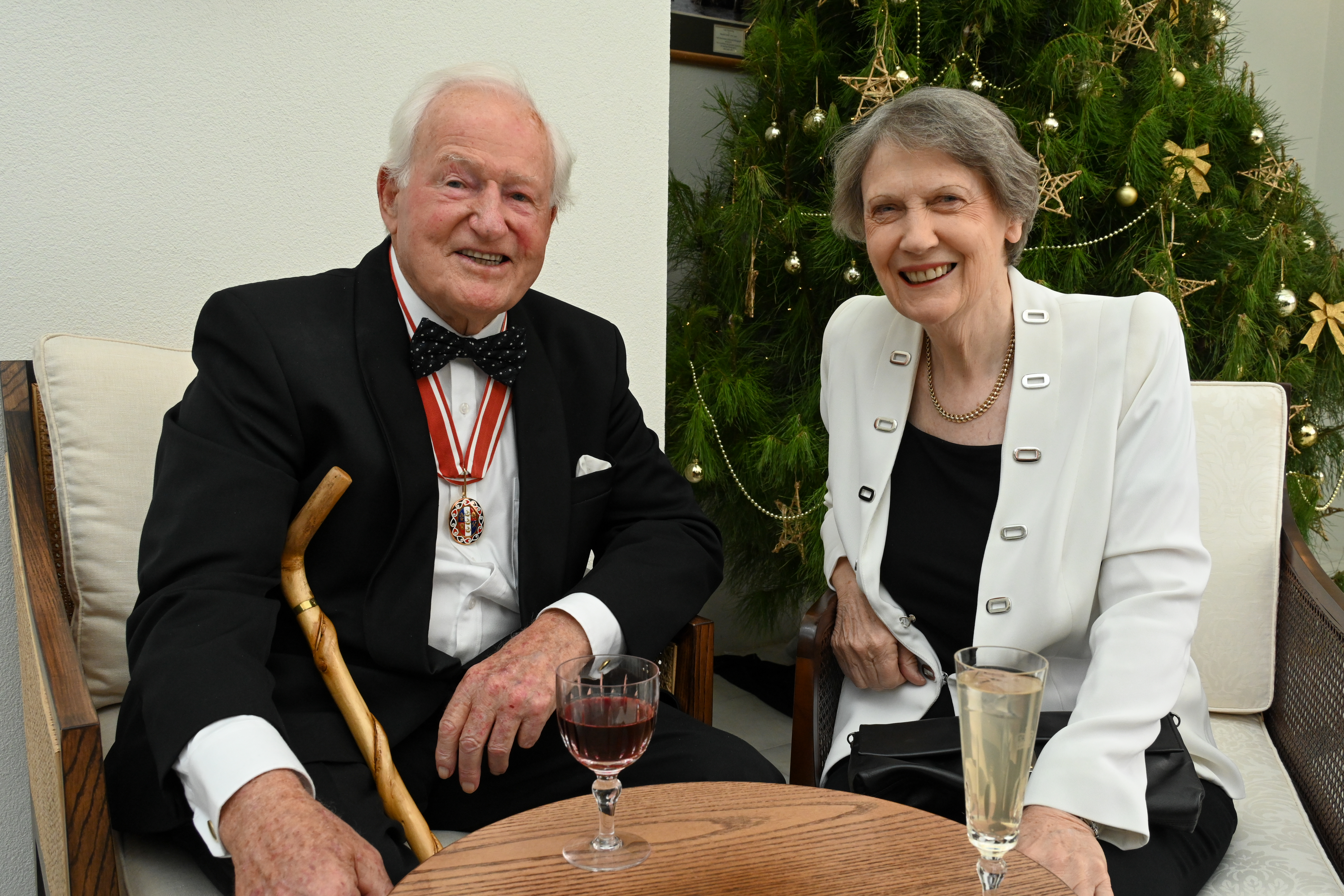
Bolger and Helen Clark in 2022

On 1 July 2008, almost 15 years after his National government sold New Zealand Rail Ltd, the Labour-led government repurchased its successor, Toll NZ Ltd (less its Tranz Link trucking and distribution arm), having repurchased the track network in 2004. Bolger became chair of the company, renamed KiwiRail, a position he held until 1 July 2010. Many commentators, including Winston Peters, viewed this as ironic. In response, Bolger acknowledged his involvement in privatising New Zealand Rail, remarking that "my life is full of ironies", and added that "the world has changed".

Bolger expressed concern about poverty and inequality in an interview with Radio New Zealand's Guyon Espiner. He also believed that trade unions may not have enough power. Some saw this as disavowing his previous adherence to free market reforms. In 2021, he stated that the modern National Party should reimagine capitalism because social inequality was causing division, saying free market capitalism is "on the verge of destroying the planet and destabilising society".

On 5 June 2018, Bolger was appointed to head the Labour government's fair pay agreement working group, tasked with reporting back on the design of industry-wide fair pay agreements by the end of that year.

In 2019, Bolger retired from the chancellorship of the University of Waikato, and was succeeded by Anand Satyanand.

As of 2022, Bolger was a member of the Board of Te Urewera, a protected area in the North Island.

== Honours and awards ==
In 1977, Bolger was awarded the Queen Elizabeth II Silver Jubilee Medal. Both Jim and Joan Bolger received the New Zealand 1990 Commemoration Medal, and, in 1993, the New Zealand Suffrage Centennial Medal. In the 1998 New Year Honours, Jim Bolger was appointed a Member of the Order of New Zealand, and Joan Bolger was appointed a Companion of the New Zealand Order of Merit for services to the community. Bolger received the Order of New Zealand without the customary knighthood bestowed on former prime ministers, as he supported eliminating honorific titles.

== Personal life and death ==
Bolger and his wife Joan were Roman Catholics, with Bolger describing himself as religious but not "deeply so". The couple had nine children. Bolger voted against abortion whenever the issue came up in a parliamentary conscience vote. He was a member of Collegium International. From 2013, the Bolgers lived in Waikanae.

Some have made reference to Jim Bolger, ironically or affectionately, as the Great Helmsman.

Bolger died of kidney failure at the Wellington Regional Hospital in Wellington, on 15 October 2025, at the age of 90.

His Requiem Mass was held on 23 October 2025 at Our Lady of Kāpiti Parish. It was attended by Governor-General Cindy Kiro and Prime Minister Christopher Luxon, who both spoke, Māori Queen Nga wai hono i te po, Speaker of the House Gerry Brownlee, and former Prime Ministers Chris Hipkins, Sir Bill English, Helen Clark, and Dame Jenny Shipley. Bolger's Deputy Prime Minister Don McKinnon attended and spoke at the Mass. While it was not an official state funeral, the Mass did see Parliament's sitting day delayed so that MPs could attend. New Zealand Defence Force leadership also attended with the Vice Chief of the Defence Force, Chief of the Navy, Chief of the Army, and Chief of the Air Force representing the services.

== See also ==
- Electoral history of Jim Bolger

== Notes ==
Government offices
Preceded by Mike Moore	Prime Minister of New Zealand; 1990–1997	Succeeded by Jenny Shipley
Political offices
Preceded by Jim McLay	Leader of the Opposition; 1986–1990	Succeeded by Mike Moore
Preceded by Peter Gordon	Minister of Labour; 1978–1984	Succeeded by Stan Rodger
Preceded by Frank Gill	Minister of Immigration; 1978–1981	Succeeded by Aussie Malcolm
New title	Minister of Fisheries; 1977–1978	Succeeded by Duncan MacIntyre
New Zealand Parliament
New constituency	Member of Parliament for King Country; 1972–1996	Constituency abolished
New constituency	Member of Parliament for Taranaki-King Country; 1996–1998	Succeeded by Shane Ardern
Party political offices
Preceded by Jim McLay	Leader of the National Party; 1986–1997	Succeeded by Jenny Shipley
Preceded by Jim McLay	Deputy Leader of the National Party; 1984–1986	Succeeded by George Gair
Diplomatic posts
Preceded by John Wood	Ambassador to the United States; 1998–2002	Succeeded by John Wood
