= Our Lady of Lourdes (Kāpiti Coast) =

Statue in Paraparaumu, New Zealand

- Our Lady of Lourdes in 2026
- Artist: Martin Roestenberg
- Year: 1958
- Dimensions: 14 m (46 ft)
- Location: Paraparaumu, New Zealand; 40°55′02″S 175°00′39″E

Our Lady of Lourdes is an outdoor statue of the Virgin Mary, located in Paraparaumu, New Zealand. It was built by Dutch artist Martin Roestenberg in 1958 after being commissioned by Catholic parish priest Father J.S. Dunn to mark the 100th anniversary of the apparition of the Virgin Mary at Lourdes. It is 14 metres tall, and was designed to last only three months.

The statue has a crown of 17 lights that give the appearance of a halo at night, which is visible for kilometres. It is hollow, made of wood, plaster and fibreglass.

There is a parish and a school named after the statue, both called Our Lady of Kapiti.

== History ==
Our Lady of Lourdes was built by Dutch artist Martin Roestenberg in 1958 after being commissioned by Catholic parish priest Father J.S. Dunn to mark the 100th anniversary of the apparition of the Virgin Mary at Lourdes.

The current statue was the second attempt at building one, as the first fell over due to wind. According to a later report, the current monument was designed to last only three months. The head, which is two metres tall, was moulded at the artist's home in Taihape. It was then lowered by crane onto scaffolding, and the statue was then built from the head downwards. There was no road on the hill when it was constructed.

The statue was completed in August 1958. This event was celebrated with a march in the streets of Paraparaumu, which commenced on 19 October 1958. It included six thousand nuns, priests and Catholic worshipers. The Archbishop of Wellington, Peter McKeefry, blessed the statue with holy water. The statue was defaced with a coal tar oil in 1959. In 1971 repairs to the plaster were made after it had started cracking. In order to protect it from weather and vandalism, several layers of fibreglass were eventually added to the statue. A Statue Bargain Barn shop under the statue opened in 1981, but it closed in 2010 due to competition from Trade Me. Then in 2014, the shop was re-opened as part of The Shed Project Kāpiti, a charity organisation working with local disabled and disadvantaged people.

On Our Lady of Lourdes' 50th anniversary in 2008, 600 Aucklanders spent the night on the hill of the statue. In 2009 it was reported that the statue was leaning over, and it was found that the hardwood posts supporting it had rotted; they were replaced with tanalised timber, and four concrete piles were also added. Ten years earlier, a crack at the base of the statue had been found. In 2017, 500 pilgrims visited Our Lady of Lourdes.

== Parish and school ==
In 2014 two local parishes (St Patrick’s, Paraparaumu and Our Lady of Fatima, Waikanae) merged to form Our Lady of Kāpiti Parish, named after the statue. Both churches were earthquake risks, and the decision was taken to build a new church and school on a central site.

The school, named Our Lady of Kapiti School opened in 2017. It was jointly funded by the Archdiocese of Wellington and the New Zealand Government.
