= 1936 Paraparaumu train wreck =

New Zealand train derailment

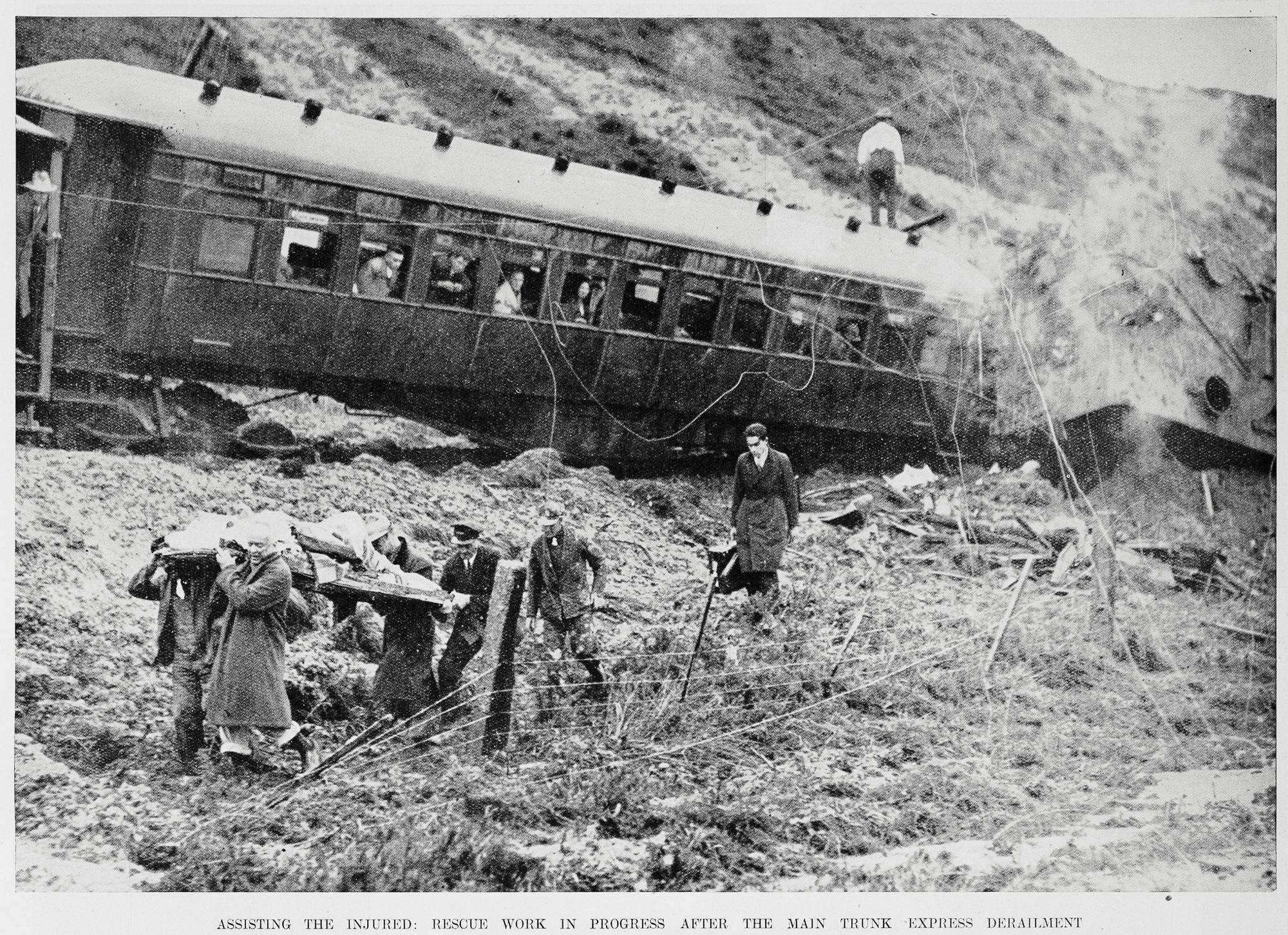
- A passenger is carried off in a stretcher with the train wreck in the background

Details
- Date: 30 August 1936; 06:25 NZST
- Location: Paraparaumu
- Coordinates: 40°55′13″S 175°00′15″E
- Country: New Zealand
- Line: North Island Main Trunk Railway
- Operator: New Zealand Railways Department
- Incident type: Derailment
- Cause: Struck landslip caused by heavy rain

Statistics
- Trains: 1
- Passengers: 70
- Deaths: 1
- Injured: 5

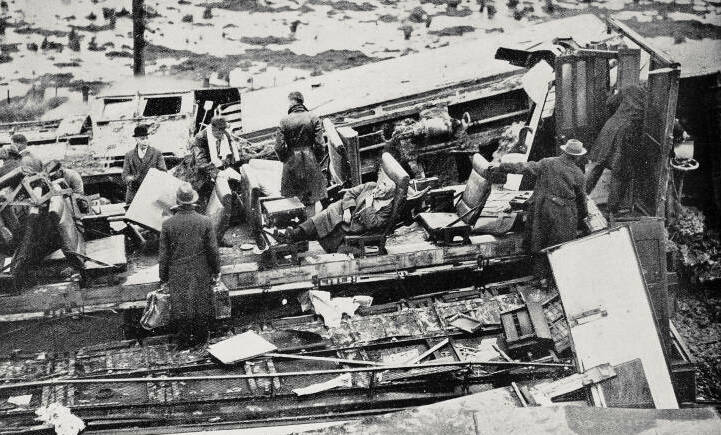
Aerial view of the crash

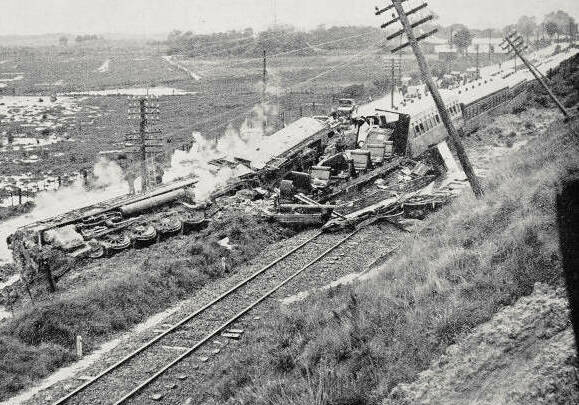
Derailed cars visible on the left, behind the toppled locomotive

The 1936 Paraparaumu train wreck occurred on Sunday, 30 August 1936 near Paraparaumu, New Zealand. A train was travelling from Auckland to Wellington in heavy rain when it derailed after striking a landslide across the tracks. One passenger died as a result of injuries received in the incident.

== Incident ==
The North Island Main Trunk Night Limited express with 70 passengers on board was travelling at 80 kilometres per hour (50 mph) when it struck a slip 400 metres (1/4 mi) south of the Paraparaumu Railway Station at 6:25 a.m. on 30 August 1936. The train fell down a three-metre (10 ft) embankment onto its side, coming to rest a few metres from the road running alongside the railway line. Five carriages came off the rails. The roof of the first passenger carriage was torn off and the walls fell onto the track. Passengers were temporarily trapped inside. The engine was half buried in the mud, and debris was thrown onto the road. Both second and third cars were completely derailed and had their trailing bogies torn off. The fourth and fifth cars derailed, but their trailing bogies were not torn off. The following cars did not derail but were badly damaged, and two cars became locked together. A sleeping car, two vans, a postal van, and a "Z wagon" (covered goods car) were undamaged.

A local dairy farmer, William Howell, noticed the slip as he was bringing in his cows for milking and ran towards the Paraparaumu Railway Station with the intention of breaking the signal wire so that the signal would enter a danger state. However, he was too late and as he saw the train approaching, he tried to signal to the train to stop, which went unnoticed in the heavy rain. After Howell raised the alarm at the railway station, a relief train and ambulances came from Wellington.

The accident caused injuries to five people. Four passengers were admitted to Wellington Hospital, and one of them, Arthur Frederick Bush, died there a week later as a result of his injuries. In the crash, Bush had sustained fractures to both legs. Injuries suffered by other passengers included: facial abrasions to Bush's son; an injured pelvis; head injuries and skin wounds; and a leg injury and facial abrasions. The train driver and fireman were not injured. While the cars were being placed back onto the rails, the muddy slip continued to slide and the shovelling men could not keep up with it. This caused a two-hour delay due to the crane and a re-railed car being blocked by the slip.

On Sunday 30 August, a number of trains, including the Napier Express and the southbound Limited Express, were diverted to run on the Wairarapa Line, which meant a slow trip via the Rimutaka Incline.

By 4:30 p.m. on Monday, the wreck had been cleared and traffic was restored to the line.
