= Barbara Kuriger =

New Zealand politician (born 1961)

Barbara Kuriger MP
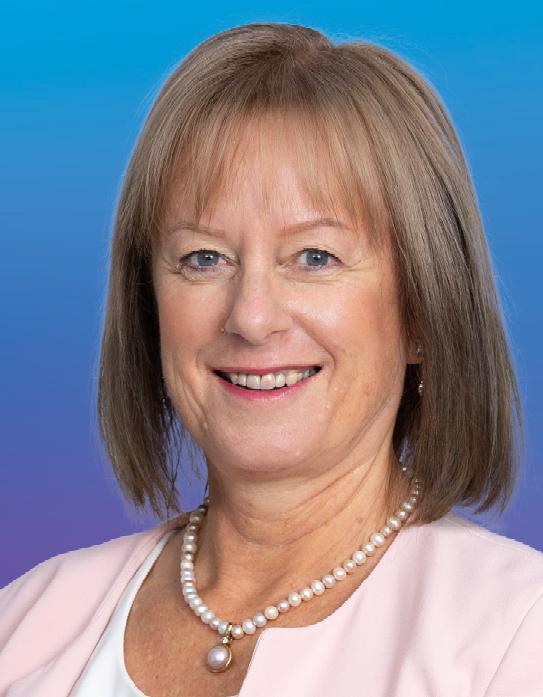
- Kuriger in 2023

12th Deputy Speaker of the New Zealand House of Representatives
- Incumbent
- Assumed office 6 December 2023
- Speaker: Gerry Brownlee
- Preceded by: Greg O'Connor

Senior Whip of the National Party
- In office 21 March 2018 – 10 November 2020
- Deputy: Matt Doocey
- Leader: Simon Bridges; Todd Muller; Judith Collins
- Preceded by: Jami-Lee Ross
- Succeeded by: Matt Doocey

Member of the New Zealand Parliament for Taranaki-King Country
- Incumbent
- Assumed office 20 September 2014
- Preceded by: Shane Ardern

Personal details
- Born: 1961 (age 64–65) Ōpunake, New Zealand
- Party: National
- Spouse: Louis Kuriger
- Profession: Farmer

Barbara Joan Kuriger (born 1961) is a New Zealand politician who has served as Deputy Speaker of the New Zealand House of Representatives since December 2023. A member of the National Party, Kuriger was first elected as the Member of Parliament (MP) for Taranaki-King Country in 2014.

== Early life ==
Kuriger was born in Ōpunake and was raised on a dairy farm. She married Louis Kuriger, a dairy farmer. They have three children.

== Farming career ==
Kuriger is a farmer, shareholder and director of three family-owned farming businesses. With her husband Louis, she won the Taranaki Sharemilker of the Year title in 1978. Kuriger has served on the boards of several companies and institutions including DairyNZ, Dairy Training Limited, Primary ITO, New Zealand Young Farmers, Taratahi Agricultural Training Centre, Te Kauta, Venture Taranaki Trust, the Dairy Women's Network, and the New Zealand Rural Games Trust. In 2012, she won the title of Dairy Woman of the Year.

Kuriger was criticised for her role as a member of the Taratahi Agricultural Training Centre board in 2015 when it was under investigation by the Serious Fraud Office. Kuriger had been a board member from 2012 to 2014 but denied knowledge of any misdoing; Labour MP David Cunliffe said Kuriger could not claim to be ignorant of what had occurred.

Kuriger is a former director of Oxbow Dairies Ltd which was charged with multiple counts of animal cruelty and neglect. Kuriger ceased being a director in 2014, while her husband Louis was still a director until late 2018 during which period the bulk of the charges were laid and offences committed. Their son, Tony, who was also a director of the company, pleaded guilty in January 2020 for causing "prolonged and severe pain" to the animals in his care.

== Political career ==
New Zealand Parliament
Years	Term	Electorate	List	Party
2014–2017	51st	Taranaki-King Country	58	National
2017–2020	52nd	Taranaki-King Country	28	National
2020–2023	53rd	Taranaki-King Country	20	National
2023–2026	54th	Taranaki-King Country	36	National
2026–present	54th	Taranaki-King Country	42	National

=== In government, 2014–2017 ===
In April 2014, Kuriger was selected as National's candidate in Taranaki-King Country to replace the retiring Shane Ardern. During the 2014 New Zealand general election, she won Taranaki-King Country for National by a margin of 16,773 votes. Her maiden statement, given on 21 October 2014, was the second to be given in the 51st Parliament's address in reply debate. In her first term, Kuriger served as deputy chair of the health committee and as a member of the primary production committee, and was a junior National Party whip.

=== In opposition, 2017–2023 ===
Reelected at the 2017 New Zealand general election, she served as the National Party's senior whip from 2018 to 2020. In March 2018 a member's bill in her name seeking to impose penalties on the parents of children before the youth court was debated and lost. Briefly in 2020 she also the party's spokesperson for food safety, rural communities, and women, and chaired Parliament's primary production committee. After the 2020 New Zealand general election, in which she won a third term, she was appointed spokesperson for agriculture, energy and resources, and food safety. She chaired the governance and administration committee from 2020 to 2021. When Christopher Luxon became the party leader in 2021, he appointed her as spokesperson for agriculture, biosecurity and food safety.

In October 2022 Kuriger resigned from her agriculture, biosecurity, and food safety portfolios due to mismanaging conflicts of interest with the Ministry for Primary Industries (MPI) over the prosecution of her husband and son. In December 2022, hundreds of pages of emails between Kuriger and MPI, obtained by Newsroom under the Official Information Act, revealed a pattern of personal attacks on MPI officials in relation to animal mistreatment charges filed against her son Tony. MPI commissioned Mike Heron KC to review its conduct in the case. That review cleared the ministry of any wrongdoing and found the investigation into Tony Kuriger was not motivated by political purposes, despite the Kurigers' repeated private and public claims to the contrary. Kuriger refused to resign from Parliament over the incident. Following a January 2023 shadow cabinet reshuffle, Kuriger was allocated the conservation portfolio but was moved outside of the shadow cabinet with no ranking.

=== In government, 2023–present ===
National returned to government for the first time in six years at the 2023 New Zealand general election. Kuriger retained her electorate by a margin of 14,355 votes, defeating Labour candidate Angela Roberts, and was appointed Deputy Speaker of the House of Representatives.

During the 2026 New Zealand general election, Kuriger contested the Taranaki-King Country for National. She was ranked 42nd on the National Party list. On 7 November, Kuriger retained the Taranaki-King Country by a margin of 12,031 votes, based on preliminary results.

New Zealand Parliament
Preceded by Shane Ardern	Member of Parliament for Taranaki-King Country; 2014–present	Incumbent
