= 1998 Taranaki-King Country by-election =

New Zealand by-election

Taranaki-King Country by-election, 1998
- 2 May 1998
- Turnout: 20,684
Candidate	Shane Ardern	Owen Jennings
Party	National	ACT
Popular vote	5,953	4,965
Percentage	29.43%	24.55%
Candidate	Max Purnell	Kevin Campbell
Party	Labour	Alliance
Popular vote	3,546	3,208
Percentage	17.53%	15.46%
Member before election
Jim Bolger
National
Elected Member
Shane Ardern
National

The Taranaki-King Country by-election was a by-election in the New Zealand electorate of Taranaki-King Country, a large and predominantly rural district in the west of New Zealand's North Island. It took place on 2 May 1998, and was precipitated by the resignation from parliament of sitting MP Jim Bolger. Bolger was retiring from politics, having recently been replaced as Prime Minister by Jenny Shipley.

The by-election was contested by all major parties. It was won by Shane Ardern, a member of Bolger's National Party, although Ardern gained a majority of only 988 votes. (In the 1996 general election Bolger had a majority of 10,223, or 37.37% in this seat.) Surprisingly, second place was won by Owen Jennings of the ACT party, a at-the-time small party that promotes economic deregulation and other laissez-faire economic policies. The Labour Party, National's traditional opponent, was pushed back into third place. The Alliance, a left-wing party, gained fourth place. Some distance behind these four were Christian Heritage, New Zealand First, and the Greens, all with similar numbers of votes. They were followed by a group of minor parties and independents.

== Results ==
The following table gives the election results:

1998 Taranaki-King Country by-election
Party	Candidate	Votes	%	±%
National	Shane Ardern	5,953	29.43	
ACT	Owen Jennings	4,965	24.55	
Labour	Max Purnell	3,546	17.53	
Alliance	Kevin Campbell	3,208	15.46	
Christian Heritage	Ewen McQueen	561	2.77	
NZ First	Robin Ord	560	2.77	
Green	Cindy McDonald	503	2.49	
Legalise Cannabis	Michael Appleby	393	1.94	
United NZ	Pauline Gardiner	127	0.63	
Independent	Doug Wilson	127	0.63	
McGillicuddy Serious	Paul Cooke	76	0.38	
Independent	Brett Power	56	0.28	
Animals First	Alistair McKellow	49	0.24	
Independent	Greg Walker	32	0.16	
Social Credit	Avon James Harris	17	0.08	
Natural Law	Tony Martin	17	0.08	
Independent	Victor Bryers	15	0.07	
Youth Independence	Robert Terry	10	0.05	
Mana Wahine	Mary Gilmore	7	0.03	
Progressive Party	Ralph Dell	3	0.01	
Majority		984	4.87	
Turnout		20,225		
National hold		Swing	-32.51	
