= Thomas (goose) =

Individual goose (c. 1978–80 – 2018)

- Species: Domestic goose
- Sex: Male
- Hatched: c. 1978–80
- Died: 6 February 2018 (aged c. 38–40); Waimanu Lagoon
- Mates: Henry; Henrietta

Thomas (c. 1978–80 – 6 February 2018) was a goose who lived at the Waimanu Lagoons in Waikanae Beach, in the Kāpiti Coast District of New Zealand's North Island. He had a relationship with a male black-feathered swan, Henry, for approximately 18 to 24 years until a female swan, Henrietta, joined them. Thomas helped raise the cygnets of Henry and Henrietta. Since Henry had a broken wing, Thomas would teach the cygnets how to fly.

Thomas was left alone when Henry died in 2009 and Henrietta flew away with another swan. Thomas later met a female goose and had his own offspring, for the first time, in 2011. The offspring were then taken by another goose. After going blind and getting attacked by swans, he was moved in 2013 to the Wellington Bird Rehabilitation Trust in Ohariu, and stayed there until his death in 2018. A plaque was placed at the lagoon to remember him and he was described by BBC News as an "icon of the LGBT community".

== Life ==
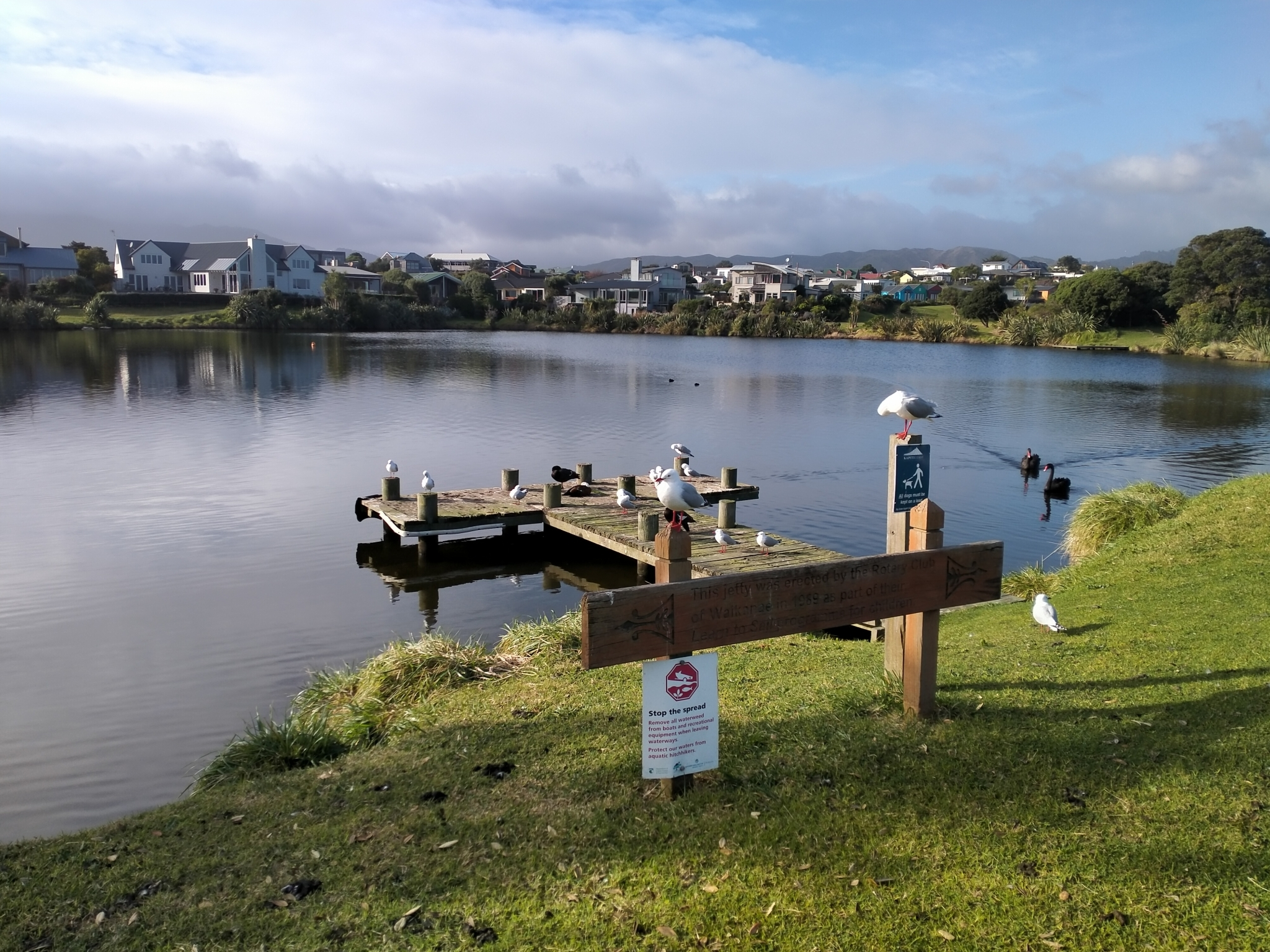
Waimanu Lagoon, where Thomas lived

The goose Thomas, who had white feathers, had lived at the Waimanu Lagoons in Waikanae Beach, in the Kāpiti Coast District of New Zealand's North Island. The black-feathered swan Henry (originally named Henrietta) appeared at the lagoons in about 1990. Henry and Thomas were in a relationship together for 18 or 24 years or until c. 2003 (sources vary) before another swan joined them. At first it was believed that Henry was a female (hence the name Henrietta), but the lack of offspring, and the fact that when the female swan appeared, she laid an egg, made it clear that Henry was a male. After his sex became apparent his name was changed from Henrietta to Henry, and the new female swan was named Henrietta. Thomas initially attacked the pair, which included breaking two of the five eggs that Henrietta had laid. But once the remaining eggs had hatched, he became friendly and helped raise them. Henry could not fly because he had an injured wing, so Thomas helped teach the cygnets to fly. In 2004, the three birds were described by The Dominion Post as "star attractions on wildlife tours of the [Waikanae] estuary".

At some point, the council decided to relocate some of the geese on the lagoons because they decided that there were too many. In order to prevent Thomas and Henry from being separated, a resident marked Thomas's feathers with red food dye. Henry died in 2009 at the age of about 30, with his body found in a creek underneath a willow branch. The community planned on placing a black boulder at the lagoon to remember him. Before Henry's death, the three raised 68 cygnets, out of 82 eggs hatched from Henry and Henrietta. After Henry's death, Henrietta found another swan and flew away, leaving Thomas alone. He met a female goose in 2011 and became the father of goslings for the first time, although a goose named George stole them and raised them himself.

During Thomas's last few years at the lagoon, he would be given breakfast by the people of a house at the edge of the lagoon. This included cat food, pieces of grain, duck pellets, corn, and an apple or a banana. In 2013, he had to have his stomach drained, started swimming in 'tight circles', was attacked by swans at the lagoon, and lost about 90 per cent of his vision after first going blind in one eye and then the other. Due to wellbeing concerns, he was moved in 2013 to the Wellington Bird Rehabilitation Trust in Ohariu, a suburb of Wellington. There, he raised parentless cygnets. His carer described him as "pretty high maintenance" and would carry Thomas every morning from his aviary to a fenced pond. He remained under the care of the trust until his death.

== Death and legacy ==
Thomas died on 6 February 2018, at the age of approximately 40 or 38 (sources vary). He had a funeral that included a small coffin and a procession that was led by a bagpiper. He was buried under the stone where Henry was buried, next to the lagoon. The funeral was attended by Kāpiti Coast District mayor K Gurunathan, who spoke at the event, and Pinky Agnew, who recited poetry. A plaque unveiled during the ceremony was later presented in December during a ceremony near the lagoon to commemorate him. The December unveiling was attended by about 50 people, including mayor Gurunathan, who spoke at the event, and Peta Mathias. Agnew wrote the epitaph:

Here lies Thomas, the great-hearted goose,

Nestled near Henry, in their final roost.

Here where they raised young and found sanctuary,

Somewhere above us, great souls fly free.

— Pinky Agnew

Upon Thomas's death, he was described by BBC News as an "icon of the LGBT community". In August 2018, it was reported that the installation of a bronze sculpture of the three birds has been proposed. Mik Peryer, of Waikanae Bird Tour said that "Waikanae could even use the statue as a brand." In 2020, a children's book about the bird, titled Thomas: A True New Zealand Love Story, was published.
