= Paraparaumu =

Town in Wellington Region, New Zealand

- Town
- View of Paraparaumu from Barry Hadfield Nikau Reserve
- Interactive map of Paraparaumu
- Coordinates: 40°54′52″S 175°00′20″E
- Country: New Zealand
- Region: Wellington Region
- Territorial authority: Kāpiti Coast District
- Ward: Paraparaumu Ward; Paekākāriki-Raumati Ward
- Community: Paraparaumu Community; Raumati Community
- Electorates: Kapiti; Te Tai Hauāuru (Māori)

Government
  - Territorial Authority: Kāpiti Coast District Council
  - Regional council: Greater Wellington Regional Council
  - Kāpiti Coast Mayor: Janet Holborow
  - Kapiti MP: Tim Costley
  - Te Tai Hauāuru MP: Debbie Ngarewa-Packer

Area
  - Total: 28.38 km^{2} (10.96 sq mi)

Population (June 2025)
  - Total: 29,900
  - Density: 1,050/km^{2} (2,730/sq mi)
- Postcode(s): 5032
- Area code: 04

Paraparaumu (Note: /ˌpærəpəˈraʊmuː/, thouɡh typically pronounced /ˌpærəˌpærəˈuːmuː/. In Māori vowels are run together (even when they are brought together by the creation of compound words), as in [ˌpaɾapaˈɾaʉmʉ].) is a town in the south-western North Island of New Zealand. It lies on the Kāpiti Coast, 51 kilometres (32 mi) north of the nation's capital city, Wellington. It is also known to residents as Pram or Paraparam. (Note: /ˈpræm/ and /ˌpærəˌpəˈræm/, respectively)

Like other towns in the area, it has a partner settlement at the coast called Paraparaumu Beach, which is directly opposite Kapiti Island. The two towns form part of the Kāpiti Coast District. Together with nearby Raumati Beach and Raumati South, Paraparaumu serves in part as a commuter town for people working in Wellington City and the wider Wellington metropolitan area. Inland behind Paraparaumu is the Maungakotukutuku area.

The village of Lindale is just north of the Paraparaumu town centre. It began as a tourist and agricultural centre, but later gained a reputation for cheese and the Lindale Barnyard petting farm.

The old State Highway 1 and the Kāpiti Line section of the North Island Main Trunk railway both pass through Lindale. The railway line was formerly owned by the Wellington and Manawatu Railway Company, and construction of the line was completed when the ends from Wellington and Longburn (Palmerston North) met near Lindale in Otaihanga in 1886. There were proposals to extend the commuter train service operated by Transdev Wellington to a new station at Lindale, subject to Wellington Regional Council funding, but these were dropped when electrification for the commuter service was extended from Paraparaumu to Waikanae.

The majority of shops are located close to the town centre in the Coastlands Mall, close to the train station.

== Name and etymology ==
Paraparaumu Airport

Paraparaumu is a Māori-language name meaning "scraps from an earth oven"; parapara means "dirt" or "scraps", and umu means "oven". The name comes from an 1819–1820 expedition of Ngāpuhi and Ngāti Toa, who travelled down the west coast of the North Island from Kāwhia to Cook Strait. As they arrived in the Kāpiti Coast, they found no useful resources.

Paraparaumu is sometimes known by the names "Pram", "Paraparam" or "Pram-Pram".

== History ==
In August 1936, a train derailed in Paraparaumu as it approached a land slide in rainy weather.

== Climate ==
Paraparaumu has an oceanic climate typical of New Zealand, with moderately warm summers and mild winters. It has a quite high rainfall frequency year round, although it is drier than many other coastal areas in the country.

Climate data for Paraparaumu (Kapiti Coast Airport) (1991–2020 normals, extremes 1953–present)
Month	Jan	Feb	Mar	Apr	May	Jun	Jul	Aug	Sep	Oct	Nov	Dec	Year
Record high °C (°F)	29.0 (84.2)	30.0 (86.0)	30.0 (86.0)	26.3 (79.3)	23.2 (73.8)	20.0 (68.0)	19.2 (66.6)	21.0 (69.8)	21.8 (71.2)	25.6 (78.1)	26.2 (79.2)	29.3 (84.7)	30.0 (86.0)
Mean maximum °C (°F)	25.3 (77.5)	25.3 (77.5)	24.5 (76.1)	21.7 (71.1)	19.3 (66.7)	17.3 (63.1)	16.0 (60.8)	16.5 (61.7)	17.9 (64.2)	19.4 (66.9)	21.3 (70.3)	23.9 (75.0)	26.5 (79.7)
Mean daily maximum °C (°F)	21.3 (70.3)	21.7 (71.1)	20.3 (68.5)	17.9 (64.2)	15.9 (60.6)	13.7 (56.7)	12.9 (55.2)	13.5 (56.3)	14.7 (58.5)	16.0 (60.8)	17.6 (63.7)	19.7 (67.5)	17.1 (62.8)
Daily mean °C (°F)	17.4 (63.3)	17.6 (63.7)	16.1 (61.0)	13.8 (56.8)	12.0 (53.6)	9.9 (49.8)	9.0 (48.2)	9.6 (49.3)	11.1 (52.0)	12.6 (54.7)	13.9 (57.0)	16.1 (61.0)	13.3 (55.9)
Mean daily minimum °C (°F)	13.5 (56.3)	13.5 (56.3)	11.8 (53.2)	9.6 (49.3)	8.2 (46.8)	6.2 (43.2)	5.0 (41.0)	5.8 (42.4)	7.5 (45.5)	9.1 (48.4)	10.3 (50.5)	12.4 (54.3)	9.4 (48.9)
Mean minimum °C (°F)	6.1 (43.0)	5.8 (42.4)	4.3 (39.7)	2.1 (35.8)	0.2 (32.4)	−1.5 (29.3)	−2.2 (28.0)	−1.4 (29.5)	−0.4 (31.3)	1.0 (33.8)	2.6 (36.7)	5.5 (41.9)	−3.0 (26.6)
Record low °C (°F)	2.8 (37.0)	2.9 (37.2)	0.8 (33.4)	−0.5 (31.1)	−3.3 (26.1)	−4.4 (24.1)	−4.8 (23.4)	−4.1 (24.6)	−3.8 (25.2)	−1.7 (28.9)	−0.4 (31.3)	1.7 (35.1)	−4.8 (23.4)
Average rainfall mm (inches)	59.7 (2.35)	67.6 (2.66)	66.7 (2.63)	80.5 (3.17)	97.1 (3.82)	108.6 (4.28)	103.7 (4.08)	95.5 (3.76)	90.2 (3.55)	107.8 (4.24)	80.9 (3.19)	88.8 (3.50)	1,047.1 (41.23)
Mean monthly sunshine hours	234.4	212.6	202.5	158.7	134.5	104.0	123.0	153.9	151.9	178.3	204.5	206.2	2,064.5
Source: NIWA

Paraparaumu is one of four places in New Zealand where weather balloons are regularly launched for MetService.

== Demographics ==
Paraparaumu is described by Stats NZ as a medium urban area, which covers 28.38 km^{2} (10.96 sq mi), which includes Otaihanga, Paraparaumu Beach, Raumati Beach and Raumati South. It had an estimated population of 29,900 as of June 2025, with a population density of 1,054 people per km^{2}.

Historical population
Year	Pop.	±% p.a.
2006	25,260	—
2013	26,838	+0.87%
2018	28,701	+1.35%
2023	28,938	+0.16%
The 2006 population is for a larger area of 28.61 km^{2}. Source:

Paraparaumu had a population of 28,938 in the 2023 New Zealand census, an increase of 237 people (0.8%) since the 2018 census, and an increase of 2,100 people (7.8%) since the 2013 census. There were 13,749 males, 15,063 females, and 123 people of other genders in 11,661 dwellings. 3.6% of people identified as LGBTIQ+. The median age was 46.4 years (compared with 38.1 years nationally). There were 4,890 people (16.9%) aged under 15 years, 4,215 (14.6%) aged 15 to 29, 12,828 (44.3%) aged 30 to 64, and 7,005 (24.2%) aged 65 or older.

People could identify as more than one ethnicity. The results were 87.5% European (Pākehā); 13.5% Māori; 3.9% Pasifika; 7.3% Asian; 1.1% Middle Eastern, Latin American and African New Zealanders (MELAA); and 2.7% other, which includes people giving their ethnicity as "New Zealander". English was spoken by 97.6%, Māori by 2.6%, Samoan by 0.5%, and other languages by 10.7%. No language could be spoken by 1.7% (e.g. too young to talk). New Zealand Sign Language was known by 0.7%. The percentage of people born overseas was 24.7, compared with 28.8% nationally.

Religious affiliations were 30.9% Christian, 1.1% Hindu, 0.3% Islam, 0.4% Māori religious beliefs, 0.6% Buddhist, 0.6% New Age, 0.1% Jewish, and 1.3% other religions. People who answered that they had no religion were 58.2%, and 6.6% of people did not answer the census question.

Of those at least 15 years old, 6,114 (25.4%) people had a bachelor's or higher degree, 12,876 (53.5%) had a post-high school certificate or diploma, and 5,055 (21.0%) people exclusively held high school qualifications. The median income was $40,100, compared with $41,500 nationally. 3,468 people (14.4%) earned over $100,000 compared to 12.1% nationally. The employment status of those at least 15 was 11,175 (46.5%) full-time, 3,354 (13.9%) part-time, and 591 (2.5%) unemployed.

Major subdivisions
Name	Area (km^{2})	Population	Density (per km^{2})	Dwellings	Median age	Median income
Paraparaumu Beach	5.12	9,213	1,799	3,765	47.9 years	$40,100
Paraparaumu (further breakdown below)	14.67	10,689	729	4,284	45.7 years	$38,100
Raumati Beach and Raumati South	8.59	9,036	1,052	3,612	45.7 years	$43,100
New Zealand					38.1 years	$41,500

Individual statistical areas for the Paraparaumu subdivision
Name	Area (km^{2})	Population	Density (per km^{2})	Dwellings	Median age	Median income
Otaihanga	4.16	855	206	309	44.9 years	$44,700
Paraparaumu North	3.53	3,576	1,013	1,431	48.6 years	$40,500
Paraparaumu Central	4.46	3,966	889	1,713	44.5 years	$36,300
Paraparaumu East	2.51	2,295	914	828	42.6 years	$35,900
New Zealand					38.1 years	$41,500

== Economy ==
=== Retail ===
Coastlands Shopping Centre opened in Paraparaumu in 1969. It has 1400 carparks and 94 shops, including Pak'nSave, The Warehouse, Farmers and Woolworths.

== Sport ==
Paraparaumu was formerly represented in soccer/football by Paraparaumu United. They merged with the Raumati Hearts in 2003 to create Kapiti Coast United, which is based at Weka Park in Raumati.

The local athletics club is Paraparaumu Track and Field Club, which has both junior and senior members in conjunction with Athletics Wellington and Athletics New Zealand age grades. The club is based at the Paraparaumu Domain.

Paraparaumu Beach also has a golf course. It has hosted the New Zealand Open a total of 12 times, a record unsurpassed by any other course.

== Transport ==
=== Airport ===
Kapiti Coast Airport has a few scheduled commercial flights and is a popular recreational airfield, hosting the Kapiti Aero Club. Air Chathams will have daily flights between the airport and Auckland from 20 August 2018, and Sounds Air operate to Blenheim and Nelson. Now defunct, locally based Air2there used operate to Blenheim and Nelson also. Prior to the mid 2010s Air New Zealand used to have scheduled services to Kapiti Coast Airport with their ATR-42s and Q-400/ DHC-8s. This was then cancelled in the mid 2010s.

=== Public transport ===
Paraparaumu is located on the North Island Main Trunk Railway (NIMT), on the Kāpiti Line of Wellington's commuter railway network operated by Transdev under the Metlink brand. Electrified commuter services were extended to Waikanae on 20 February 2011. Korean built by Hyundai Rotem, FP/FT class electric multiple units operate the commuter trains.

Beyond Waikanae, KiwiRail's Great Journeys New Zealand division operates two diesel-hauled long distance passenger services: the Capital Connection between Palmerston North and Wellington, and the Northern Explorer between Auckland and Wellington.

There are also feeder and local commuter bus service operated by Metlink.

== Education ==
=== Primary schools ===
Paraparaumu School is a state primary school for Year 1 to 8 Students with a roll of 305 It opened in a building "on skids" in 1889 and moved to a new building on the current site in 1890. A fire in 2014 caused extensive damage to the school.

Kapiti School is a state primary school for Year 1 to 8 students, with a roll of 101. The school was open by 1973.

Our Lady of Kapiti School is a state-integrated Catholic primary school for Year 1 to 8 students, with a roll of 300 It is named after a large statue of the Virgin Mary located near by. The school opened in 2017, replacing St Patrick's School, which had opened in 1954.

All these schools are co-educational. Rolls are as of July 2026.

Paraparaumu Beach and Kenakena Schools are covered at Paraparaumu Beach#Education. Raumati Beach School is covered at Raumati Beach#Education. Raumati South and Te Rā Schools are covered at Raumati South#Education.

=== Secondary schools ===
Three secondary schools are located near the Paraparaumu township: Paraparaumu College in Paraparaumu Beach, Kāpiti College in Raumati Beach and Ōtaki College in Ōtaki.

== Notable residents ==
- James Ashcroft – film director
- Christian Cullen – rugby union footballer
- Stephen Kearney – rugby league footballer and coach
- Wayne McIndoe – field hockey player
- Drew Ne'emia – former television presenter
- Andrew Niccol – film director

=== Educated in Paraparaumu ===
- Peter Jackson at Kāpiti College – film director
- Dane Coles at Paraparaumu College – All Blacks player
- Karl Kippenberger at Kāpiti College – bass player in Shihad
