= Jennings v Buchanan =

- Court: Judicial Committee of the Privy Council
- Full case name: Owen Robert Jennings v Roger Edward Wyndham Buchanan
- Decided: 14 July 2004
- Citation: [2004] NZPC 4; [2004] UKPC 36; [2005] 2 NZLR 577; [2005] 1 AC 115
- Transcript: Privy Council judgment

Court membership
- Judges sitting: Lord Bingham of Cornhill, Lord Scott of Foscote, Lord Walker of Gestingthorpe, Baroness Hale of Richmond, Dame Sian Elias

Keywords
- defamation

Jennings v Buchanan [2004] NZPC 4; [2004] UKPC 36; [2005] 2 NZLR 577; [2005] 1 AC 115 is a cited case in New Zealand regarding defamation and the defence of parliamentary privilege.

== Background ==
In 1997, during a parliamentary debate, ACT MP Owen Jennings made a claim about an unnamed member of the Wool Board who had arranged a sponsorship by the NZWB for a rugby event, in order that he could take his mistress on the tour to carry on their "illicit affair".

Whilst he did not name this official, most people knew he was talking about NZWB member Roger Buchanan.

Unfortunately for Buchanan, as this comment was made in Parliament, Jennings was protected by parliamentary privilege.

However, several months later, during an interview with The Independent newspaper, Jennings said that he “did not resile from his claim about the officials' relationship”, and as a result, Buchanan sued Jennings in defamation for his comments in the subsequent interview.

Jennings defended the matter, saying that he was merely repeating comments he made in Parliament, and those original comments were absolutely protected by parliamentary privilege.

== Held ==
The court ruled that privilege did not apply in the interview, and so his defence failed.
