= Kapiti Marine Reserve =

New Zealand marine reserve

- IUCN category Ia (strict nature reserve)
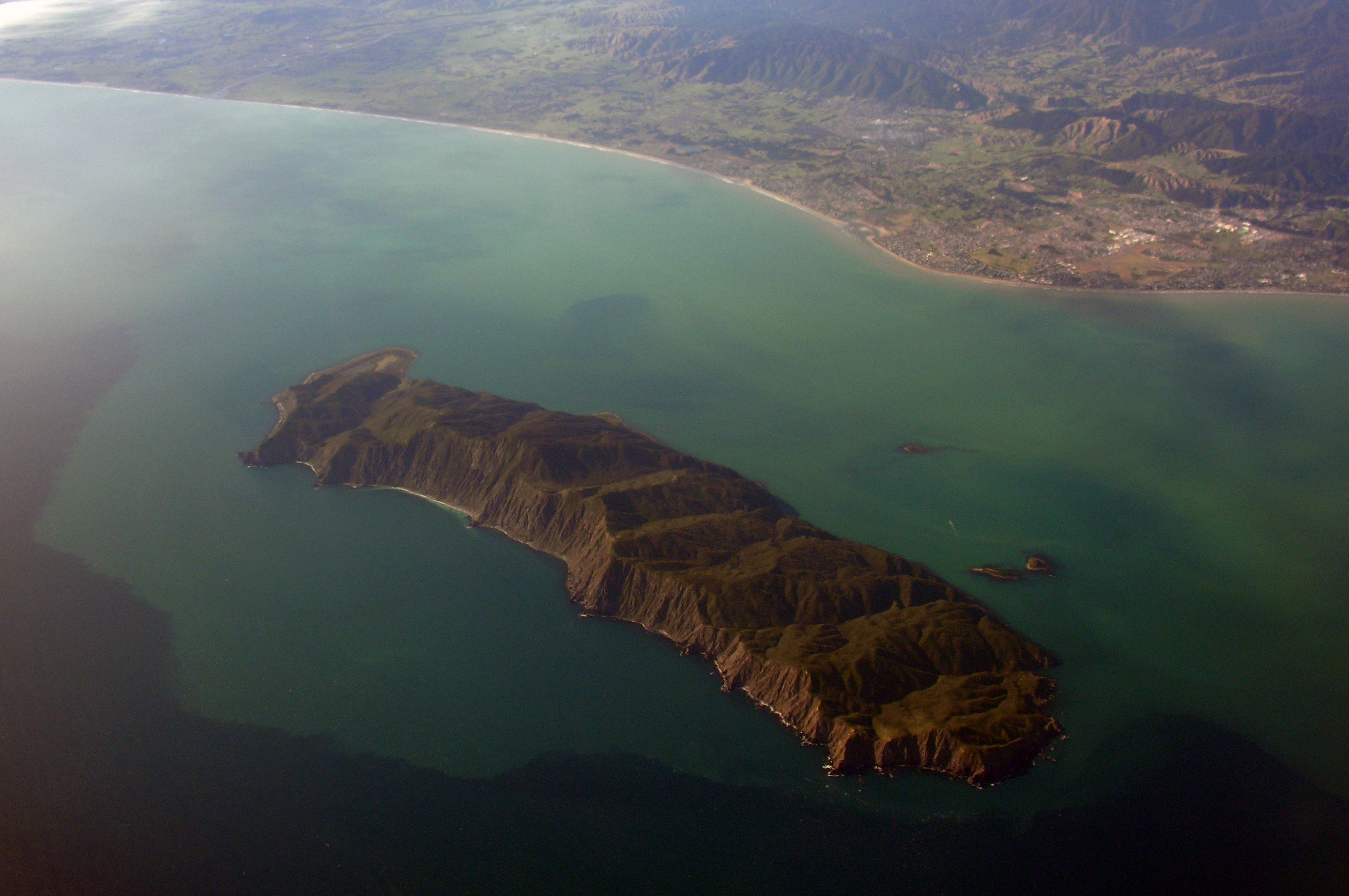
- Aerial view of the back of Kapiti Island

- Location within New Zealand
- Interactive map of Kapiti Marine Reserve
- Location: New Zealand
- Nearest city: Porirua
- Coordinates: 40.8811°S 174.9489°E
- Area: 21.67 km^{2} (8.37 sq mi)
- Established: 1992
- Governing body: Department of Conservation

Kapiti Marine Reserve is a marine reserve on two sides of Kapiti Island, off the southern west coast of the North Island of New Zealand. It was created in 1992 following concerns about the declining state of the marine ecosystem in the area, becoming the fourth marine reserve established in New Zealand.

The reserve covers an area of 2,167 hectares (8.37 sq mi) in two non-contiguous sections. The Western section lies off the north-west coast of Kapiti Island. The Eastern section covers a triangle-shaped area of Rauoterangi Channel, reaching the coast of the North Island near the mouth of the Waikanae River. It is 30 kilometres north of the city of Porirua.

== History ==
The area around Kapiti Island was an important location for local Māori people, particularly during the Musket Wars. The island was occupied in the 1820s by Ngāti Toa following Te Heke Mai Raro, their migration south from the Waikato along the North Island's west coast. Ngāti Toa rangatira Te Rauparaha used the island as a base from which to launch raids across the lower North and upper South Islands, while the island itself was the site of the 1824 Battle of Waiorua between Ngāti Toa and local iwi. By 1840, Ngāti Toa had established themselves firmly in the region, before signing the Treaty of Waitangi from Kapiti Island in May that year.

Early Pākehā interaction with the area came in the form of whaling stations, several sites being established in Kapiti during the 1830s and 1840s on the encouragement of Ngāti Toa. This was to take advantage of migratory routes of the southern right whale, which would pass through Rauoterangi Channel on their way from Cook Strait to calving areas in the South Taranaki Bight. This industry was short lived in the area due to overhunting, and most whaling stations had closed by 1849. Through the latter half of the 19th century, Pākehā settlement of the Kapiti area gradually increased, particularly following the opening of a railway line connecting the region to Wellington in 1886. Increasing connections to the capital through the early 20th century established Kapiti first as a seaside holiday destination, and during the 1960s and 70s as a residential area where people could commute into Wellington.

=== Establishment ===
As early as the 1940s, concerns were being raised by locals that increasing population and commercial activity in the area had placed pressure on the region's marine environment, which was in a noticeable decline. A survey conducted on the waters around Kapiti Island prior to the reserve being established found very little sea life, including low numbers of crayfish and pāua, and an absence of butterfish, blue cod and snapper. In response to this decline, the Ministry of Agriculture and Fisheries had investigated declaring a protected area around the island, while in 1987 local boating clubs declared voluntary no-fishing zones on the eastern side of the island. These moves led the Department of Conservation to propose a marine reserve in the waters around Kapiti Island in May 1990. The initial proposal included a stretch of water off the island's north and west coasts, as well as a larger section of Rauoterangi Channel with parallel boundaries extending from the island to Paraparaumu and Waikanae Beaches.

The proposal was quickly opposed by both commercial fishermen and local recreational boaters, who respectively argued that the reserve would be difficult to enforce without fostering poaching and that the area was the only safe location for recreational fishing on the coast. In response to this opposition and in an attempt to achieve local buy-in for the reserve, the proposed size was reduced – removing portions from each end of the western reserve, and changing the rectangular eastern reserve into a wedge shape. These concessions secured local support, and the reserve was established in May 1992.

== Geography and ecology ==
Kapiti Island and Rauoterangi Channel sit at the convergence of the D'Urville and Canterbury (or Southland) Currents, which bring warm water south from Taranaki and cool water north from Cook Strait respectively. This creates an environment in which multiple different habitats are found in close proximity to each other, with species from both colder and warmer waters both found in the reserve. In the western portion of the reserve primarily contains large boulder reefs with seaweed cover, as well as bryozoan beds unique to the area. Sea sponges are common, as are butterfish, butterfly perch, and red moki. Kekeno, or New Zealand fur seals, are also common in winter, with the reserve supporting a winter haulout on the shore of Kapiti Island.

Boulder reefs are also present in parts of the eastern portion, however these are smaller in size, interspersed with sand, and have less seaweed than those on the western side of the island. Despite the similar habitat, species found here are distinct to the western portion, and include eagle rays, blue cod, tarakihi and goatfish. Other portions of the eastern side of the reserve are more distinct again, and feature open expanses of water with a sea floor of sand or silt. These areas have little cover, leading to strong currents and limited seaweed in the main channel. The species in this portion of the reserve are different again, and include bluefin gurnards, skates, and other bottom dwellers such as shellfish and worms.

The eastern portion of the reserve also protects the only known rhodolith bed in the lower North Island. The extent of this bed is not fully clear, although it extended for a distance of at least 200 m (660 ft) north, east, and south of the research point established in a 1993 study, which would make the beds the largest known example in New Zealand. The rhodoliths provide an important habitat for smaller species, including as a nursery area for scallops, crabs, and bivalves.

Since the establishment of the reserve, fish stocks within the protected area have increased in both abundance and size when compared to areas outside the reserve. After eight years of the reserve being in effect, there were significantly more blue cod and banded wrasse compared to nearby non-protected areas, while blue cod, butterfish and blue moki were significantly larger compared to outside the reserve. Within 20 years of the reserve being established, the overall biomass of exploited reef fish had increased in the area by between 300 and 400 percent, and the biomass of butterfish specifically increased by 2100 percent. Similar impacts were less pronounced for heavily fished invertebrates, such as pāua and crayfish, although these already had a lower prevalence in the region prior to the reserve.

== See also ==
- Marine reserves of New Zealand
