= Taranaki-King Country =

- Single-member general constituency for the New Zealand House of Representatives
- Interactive map of boundaries from the 2026 election
- Formation: 1996
- Region: Taranaki and Waikato
- Character: Rural
- Term: 3 years

Member for Taranaki-King Country
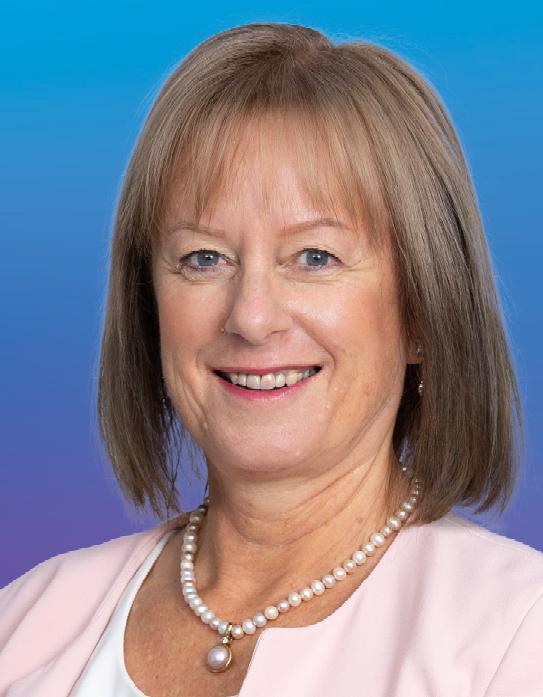
- Barbara Kuriger since 20 September 2014
- Party: National
- Previous MP: Shane Ardern (National)
Party vote distribution

Taranaki-King Country is a New Zealand parliamentary electorate, returning one Member of Parliament to the New Zealand House of Representatives. The current MP for Taranaki-King Country is Barbara Kuriger of the National Party. She has held this position since the 2014 general election.

== Population centres ==
Taranaki-King Country stretches down the western coast of the North Island, starting at the outskirts of Hamilton, through to the King Country towns of Te Awamutu, Ōtorohanga and Te Kūiti, and ending in the northern Taranaki region, to take in the eastern and southern section of the New Plymouth District, including the communities of Waitara, Inglewood, Egmont Village and Midhirst, and all of Stratford District except Stratford itself. From 2008, it has included the town of Raglan. The 2025 boundary review saw the electorate lose its part of Waitara to New Plymouth and gain Taumarunui from Rangitīkei.

Map of boundaries at the 2020 and 2023 general elections

The boundaries have gradually been expanded as the population has fallen, relative to the overall population of the country. At the 2013 revision the proposed boundaries received the third highest number (25) of objections in the country. After the 2013 revision the constituency covered parts of 3 regional councils and 7 district councils (Waikato District, Waipa District, Ōtorohanga District, Waitomo District, New Plymouth District, Stratford District, Ruapehu District), including Hamilton Airport.

== History ==
The seat was created ahead of the introduction of mixed-member proportional voting in 1996 from most of the old King Country seat with parts of Taranaki, Waitotara in the south and Waipa in the area around Hamilton. All these seats were safe National seats covering rural areas traditionally loyal to the National Party, the new seat remained faithful to old allegiances in the face of a large swing to New Zealand First in the central North Island at the 1996 election. The first MP for Taranaki-King Country was the then Prime Minister of New Zealand, Jim Bolger.

Having been ousted from the leadership of his party, Bolger accepted the role of Ambassador to the United States in the middle of 1998, and triggered the 1998 by-election. Despite a large swing to ACT Party candidate Owen Jennings, Bolger's chosen successor Shane Ardern won a narrow victory on a heavily reduced turnout. Since the 1998 by-election, Taranaki-King Country has reverted to form, giving Ardern two out of every three votes cast in 2005, 2008 and 2011.

== Members of Parliament ==
Unless otherwise stated, all MPs terms began and ended at general elections.

Key

National Alliance Labour

Election	Winner
1996 election	Jim Bolger
1998 by-election	Shane Ardern
1999 election	Shane Ardern
2002 election	Shane Ardern
2005 election	Shane Ardern
2008 election	Shane Ardern
2011 election	Shane Ardern
2014 election	Barbara Kuriger
2017 election	Barbara Kuriger
2020 election	Barbara Kuriger
2023 election	Barbara Kuriger

== List MPs ==
Members of Parliament elected from party lists in elections where that person also unsuccessfully contested the Taranaki-King Country electorate. Unless otherwise stated, all MPs terms began and ended at general elections.

Election	Winner
1999 election	Kevin Campbell
1999 election	Owen Jennings
2005 election	Maryan Street
2020 election	Angela Roberts

== Election results ==
=== 2026 election ===
The next election will be held on 7 November 2026. Candidates for Taranaki-King Country are listed at Candidates in the 2026 New Zealand general election by electorate § Taranaki-King Country. Official results will be available after 27 November 2026.

=== 2023 election ===
2023 general election: Taranaki-King Country
Notes:	Blue background denotes the winner of the electorate vote. Pink background denotes a candidate elected from their party list. Yellow background denotes an electorate win by a list member, or other incumbent. A ✓ or ✗ denotes status of any incumbent, win or lose respectively.						
Party	Candidate	Votes	%	±%	Party votes	%	±%
National	✓ Barbara Kuriger	24,760	67.75	+21.69	19,281	46.97	+10.70
Labour	Angela Roberts	10,405	25.67	–12.67	7,022	17.10	–20.37
Independent	William Bruce Burr	3,388	8.35	–			
Vision NZ	Daryl Raison	948	2.33	–			
ACT					5,484	13.36	+2.01
NZ First					3,398	8.27	+5.53
Green					2,828	6.88	+2.09
NZ Loyal					800	1.94	–
Opportunities					645	1.45	+0.22
Te Pāti Māori					494	1.20	+0.74
NewZeal					229	0.55	+0.39
Legalise Cannabis					165	0.40	+0.02
Freedoms NZ					137	0.33	–
New Conservatives					104	0.25	–2.47
DemocracyNZ					77	0.18	–
Animal Justice					66	0.16	–
Leighton Baker Party					43	0.10	–
Women's Rights					32	0.07	–
New Nation					31	0.07	–
Informal votes		1,029			209		
Total valid votes		40,530			41,045		
National hold	Majority	14,355	35.41	+27.70			

=== 2020 election ===
2020 general election: Taranaki-King Country
Notes:	Blue background denotes the winner of the electorate vote. Pink background denotes a candidate elected from their party list. Yellow background denotes an electorate win by a list member, or other incumbent. A ✓ or ✗ denotes status of any incumbent, win or lose respectively.						
Party	Candidate	Votes	%	±%	Party votes	%	±%
National	✓ Barbara Kuriger	18,702	46.06	−19.25	14,851	36.27	−21.63
Labour	Angela Roberts	15,568	38.34	+14.81	15,341	37.47	+13.67
ACT	Brent Miles	2,376	5.85	—	4,648	11.35	+10.73
New Conservative	Lee Anne Smith	2,151	5.30	+3.75	1,115	2.72	+2.40
Outdoors	Christopher Grey	870	2.14	—	121	0.30	+0.20
Green					1,962	4.79	+0.36
NZ First					1,123	2.74	−6.24
Advance NZ					513	1.25	—
Opportunities					502	1.23	−0.97
Māori Party					187	0.46	−0.06
Legalise Cannabis					154	0.38	+0.06
ONE					66	0.16	—
Vision NZ					30	0.07	—
Sustainable NZ					26	0.06	—
Social Credit					21	0.05	+0.01
TEA					18	0.04	—
Heartland					8	0.02	—
Informal votes		938			260		
Total valid votes		40,605			40,946		
National hold	Majority	3,134	7.71	−34.07			

=== 2017 election ===
2017 general election: Taranaki-King Country
Notes:	Blue background denotes the winner of the electorate vote. Pink background denotes a candidate elected from their party list. Yellow background denotes an electorate win by a list member, or other incumbent. A ✓ or ✗ denotes status of any incumbent, win or lose respectively.						
Party	Candidate	Votes	%	±%	Party votes	%	±%
National	✓ Barbara Kuriger	23,854	65.31	−2.86	21,466	57.9	−3.56
Labour	Hilary Humphrey	8,595	23.53	+6.57	8,823	23.8	10.45
Green	Robert Moore	2,900	7.94	−1.5	1,643	4.43	−2.78
Conservative	Allan Thomson	568	1.55	−2.79	118	0.32	−5.36
NZ First					3,330	8.98	−0.5
Opportunities					815	2.2	—
ACT					231	0.62	+0.26
Māori Party					194	0.52	−0.03
Legalise Cannabis					120	0.32	−0.17
Ban 1080					97	0.26	−0.2
Outdoors					37	0.10	—
United Future					37	0.10	−0.15
People's Party					31	0.09	—
Democrats					13	0.04	−0.02
Mana					9	0.02	−0.55 (Note: 2017 Mana Party swing is relative to the votes for Internet-Mana in 2014; it shared a party list with the Internet Party in the 2014 election)
Internet					7	0.02	−0.55 (Note: 2017 Internet Party swing is relative to the votes for Internet-Mana in 2014; it shared a party list with Mana Party in the 2014 election)
Informal votes		606			124		
Total valid votes		36,523			37,095		
National hold	Majority	15,259	41.78	−9.43			

=== 2014 election ===
2014 general election: Taranaki-King Country
Notes:	Blue background denotes the winner of the electorate vote. Pink background denotes a candidate elected from their party list. Yellow background denotes an electorate win by a list member, or other incumbent. A ✓ or ✗ denotes status of any incumbent, win or lose respectively.						
Party	Candidate	Votes	%	±%	Party votes	%	±%
National	Barbara Kuriger	22,328	68.17	−1.48	20,637	61.46	+1.02
Labour	Penny Gaylor	5,555	16.96	+2.26	4,483	13.35	−2.60
Green	Robert Moore	3,091	9.44	+0.02	2,422	7.21	−1.02
Conservative	Edward Aish	1,420	4.34	+4.34	1,907	5.68	+1.88
Internet	Grant Keinzley	209	0.64	+0.64			
Democrats	David Espin	152	0.46	+0.46	20	0.06	−0.02
NZ First					3,182	9.48	+2.22
Internet Mana					191	0.57	+0.30
Māori Party					185	0.55	−0.12
Legalise Cannabis					163	0.49	−0.08
Ban 1080					156	0.46	+0.46
ACT					120	0.36	−1.13
United Future					85	0.25	−0.85
Civilian					11	0.03	+0.03
Independent Coalition					9	0.03	+0.03
Focus					8	0.02	+0.02
Informal votes		463			99		
Total valid votes		33,218			33,678		
National hold	Majority	16,773	51.21	+0.78			

=== 2011 election ===
2011 general election: Taranaki-King Country
Notes:	Blue background denotes the winner of the electorate vote. Pink background denotes a candidate elected from their party list. Yellow background denotes an electorate win by a list member, or other incumbent. A ✓ or ✗ denotes status of any incumbent, win or lose respectively.						
Party	Candidate	Votes	%	±%	Party votes	%	±%
National	✓ Shane Ardern	20,842	69.65	+0.97	18,759	60.44	+0.90
Labour	Rick Barker	5,753	19.22	−0.33	4,950	15.95	−5.24
Green	Robert Moore	2,819	9.42	+1.01	2,554	8.23	+3.25
United Future	Victoria Rogers	511	1.71	+1.71	340	1.10	+0.30
NZ First					2,252	7.26	+2.76
Conservative					1,180	3.80	+3.80
ACT					461	1.49	−3.57
Māori Party					209	0.67	−0.34
Legalise Cannabis					181	0.58	+0.23
Mana					83	0.27	+0.27
Democrats					25	0.08	−0.17
Alliance					24	0.08	−0.01
Libertarianz					20	0.06	+0.01
Informal votes		1,046			251		
Total valid votes		29,925			31,038		
National hold	Majority	15,089	50.42	+1.30			

Electorate (as at 11 November 2011): 41,152

=== 2008 election ===
2008 general election: Taranaki-King Country
Notes:	Blue background denotes the winner of the electorate vote. Pink background denotes a candidate elected from their party list. Yellow background denotes an electorate win by a list member, or other incumbent. A ✓ or ✗ denotes status of any incumbent, win or lose respectively.						
Party	Candidate	Votes	%	±%	Party votes	%	±%
National	✓ Shane Ardern	21,834	68.67		19,232	59.54	
Labour	Renée van de Weert	6,216	19.55		6,844	21.19	
Green	Rob Hamill	2,675	8.41		1,607	4.97	
ACT	William Izard	767	2.41		1,634	5.06	
Democrats	Iain Parker	302	0.95		82	0.25	
NZ First					1,451	4.49	
Māori Party					327	1.01	
United Future					258	0.80	
Bill and Ben					244	0.76	
Progressive					192	0.59	
Kiwi					151	0.47	
Legalise Cannabis					114	0.35	
Family Party					96	0.30	
Alliance					28	0.09	
Libertarianz					16	0.05	
Workers Party					13	0.04	
Pacific					9	0.03	
RONZ					3	0.01	
RAM					1	0.00	
Informal votes		391			153		
Total valid votes		31,794			32,302		
National hold	Majority	15,618	49.12				

=== 2005 election ===
2005 general election: Taranaki-King Country
Notes:	Blue background denotes the winner of the electorate vote. Pink background denotes a candidate elected from their party list. Yellow background denotes an electorate win by a list member, or other incumbent. A ✓ or ✗ denotes status of any incumbent, win or lose respectively.						
Party	Candidate	Votes	%	±%	Party votes	%	±%
National	✓ Shane Ardern	20,867	67.62	+16.43	17,760	56.42	
Labour	Maryan Street	7,749	25.11	+0.16	7,886	25.05	
United Future	Anne Copeland	568	1.84		638	2.03	
ACT	Richard Steele	547	1.77		659	2.09	
Progressive	William Smith	510	1.65		256	0.81	
Destiny	Tony Harrison	425	1.38		279	0.89	
Christian Heritage	Mark Jones	195	0.63		70	0.22	
NZ First					2,538	8.06	
Green					990	3.15	
Māori Party					191	0.61	
Legalise Cannabis					89	0.28	
Democrats					35	0.11	
Libertarianz					20	0.06	
Alliance					15	0.05	
One NZ					13	0.04	
Direct Democracy					12	0.04	
99 MP					10	0.03	
Family Rights					8	0.03	
RONZ					8	0.03	
Informal votes		411			139		
Total valid votes		30,861			31,477		
National hold	Majority	13,118	42.51	+16.27			

=== 1999 election ===
Refer to Candidates in the New Zealand general election 1999 by electorate#Taranaki-King Country for a list of candidates.

=== 1998 by-election ===
1998 Taranaki-King Country by-election
Party	Candidate	Votes	%	±%
National	Shane Ardern	5,953	29.43	
ACT	Owen Jennings	4,965	24.55	
Labour	Max Purnell	3,546	17.53	
Alliance	Kevin Campbell	3,208	15.46	
Christian Heritage	Ewen McQueen	561	2.77	
NZ First	Robin Ord	560	2.77	
Green	Cindy McDonald	503	2.49	
Legalise Cannabis	Michael Appleby	393	1.94	
United NZ	Pauline Gardiner	127	0.63	
Independent	Doug Wilson	127	0.63	
McGillicuddy Serious	Paul Cooke	76	0.38	
Independent	Brett Power	56	0.28	
Animals First	Alistair McKellow	49	0.24	
Independent	Greg Walker	32	0.16	
Social Credit	Avon James Harris	17	0.08	
Natural Law	Tony Martin	17	0.08	
Independent	Victor Bryers	15	0.07	
Youth Independence	Robert Terry	10	0.05	
Mana Wahine	Mary Gilmore	7	0.03	
Progressive Party	Ralph Dell	3	0.01	
Majority		984	4.87	
Turnout		20,225		
National hold		Swing	-32.51	
