= Owen Jennings =

New Zealand politician

Member of the New Zealand Parliament for ACT list
- In office 12 October 1996 – 27 July 2002

President of Federated Farmers
- In office 1990–1993
- Preceded by: Brian Chamberlin
- Succeeded by: Graham Robertson

Personal details
- Born: Owen Robert Jennings; 1945 or 1946 (age 79–80)
- Party: ACT New Zealand
- Occupation: Farmer

Owen Robert Jennings (born 1945 or 1946) is a former New Zealand politician. He was a Member of Parliament from 1996 to 2002, representing the ACT New Zealand party.

== Biography ==
=== Early life and career ===
Jennings was born in 1945 or 1946. Before entering politics, he was a farmer, purchasing a family farm in Karamea in 1964. In 1967, Jennings married Doreen Amelia Dron at Hope Gospel Hall. In 1979, he was part of the Kellog farm leadership programme at Lincoln College.

Jennings was active in New Zealand Federated Farmers, becoming its national president in 1990. He served three years. Prior to this he was chairman of the national dairy section of Federated Farmers. He was a director of the Karamea Dairy Company, Atas Marketing Meat Ltd and Combined Rural Traders Ltd. He also helped start the Queen Elizabeth II National Trust and was a director for nine years. Jennings was active in the Pacific Basin Economic Council and attended a number of trade talks on behalf of farmers.

=== Political career ===
New Zealand Parliament
Years	Term	Electorate	List	Party
1996–1999	45th	List	6	ACT
1999–2002	46th	List	6	ACT

Jennings's political career began in local government. He stood in the 1989 Nelson-Marlborough Regional Council election in the Tasman constituency for a seat on the Nelson-Marlborough Regional Council, but was unsuccessful. In 1991, he was elected to the Tasman District Council and was chairperson of the council's environmental and planning committee.

Jennings was a candidate to become the second Leader of ACT after Roger Douglas stepped down, but he lost the race to Douglas' preferred successor, Richard Prebble at the party's 1996 annual general meeting.

Jennings was first elected to Parliament in the 1996 election, becoming a list MP, having stood in the West Coast-Tasman electorate. After entering parliament he was ACT spokesperson for agriculture, local government, transport, business development and rural affairs. During his first term as an MP, he stood in the Taranaki-King Country by-election where he finished a close second to National Party candidate Shane Ardern by 984 votes.

Jennings was re-elected on the ACT Party list in 1999; however, he was ranked at 12th on the party list in 2002 and was not returned to parliament. During his time as a parliamentarian, Jennings was widely regarded as being on the rural-centric right wing of ACT.

== See also ==
- Jennings v Buchanan

== Notes ==
Business positions
Preceded by Brian Chamberlin	President of Federated Farmers; 1990–1993	Succeeded by Graham Robertson
