= Shane Ardern =

New Zealand politician

Member of the New Zealand Parliament for Taranaki-King Country
- In office 12 May 1998 – 14 August 2014
- Preceded by: Jim Bolger
- Succeeded by: Barbara Kuriger
- Majority: 15,089 (2011)

Personal details
- Born: Philip Shane Ardern; 26 January 1960 (age 66) Ōpunake, New Zealand
- Party: National
- Relations: Jacinda Ardern (distant cousin)

Philip Shane Ardern (born 26 January 1960) is a New Zealand politician. He is a member of the National Party and represented the electorate of Taranaki-King Country from 1998 to 2014.

== Early years ==
Ardern is the son of Noel and Olive Ardern. He was born and raised in Ōpunake, and attended Opunake High School. Before entering politics, he was a dairy farmer, and many of his political activities have been on behalf of the farming community. He is a distant cousin of former New Zealand Prime Minister and Labour MP Jacinda Ardern.

== Member of Parliament ==
New Zealand Parliament
Years	Term	Electorate	List	Party
1998–1999	45th	Taranaki-King Country		National
1999–2002	46th	Taranaki-King Country	35	National
2002–2005	47th	Taranaki-King Country	none	National
2005–2008	48th	Taranaki-King Country	21	National
2008–2011	49th	Taranaki-King Country	24	National
2011–2014	50th	Taranaki-King Country	27	National

Ardern first became a member of parliament due to the Taranaki-King Country by-election of 1998, which resulted from the retirement from politics of former Prime Minister Jim Bolger. He held that seat from 1998 to 2014.

Ardern became one of the driving forces behind the legislation that enabled the setting up of the dairy company Fonterra in 2001. He came to nationwide attention in late 2003 when he drove a tractor up the front steps of Parliament House as part of a protest against a proposed agricultural emissions research levy, nicknamed the "flatulence" or "fart tax". The police investigated him for dangerous conduct and charged him with disorderly conduct. At a pre-trial hearing the judge said the case was a waste of court and police resources, and next month the police withdrew the charge. From 2008 until his retirement from parliament in 2014 he served as chairman of the parliamentary Primary Production Select Committee. In late 2013 bloggers and media speculatively named Ardern as one of the National Party MPs likely to retire due to a perceived need for rejuvenation of the National Party parliamentary caucus.

== Retirement ==
Ardern announced he was stepping down from his seat in December 2013 and that he would remain an MP until the end of the 50th New Zealand Parliament. Since retiring from Parliament, Ardern has returned to his Central North Island farms, having been succeeded in the Taranki-King Country seat by Barbara Kuriger. Ardern has also begun advocating again at the grassroots levels for the Taranaki farming communities that supply Fonterra having been noted at several post-election forums held by the dairy industry.

New Zealand Parliament
Preceded by Jim Bolger	Member of Parliament for Taranaki-King Country; 1998–2014	Succeeded by Barbara Kuriger
