= Kevin Campbell (New Zealand politician) =

New Zealand politician

Member of the New Zealand Parliament for Alliance party list
- In office 1999–2002

Co-leader of the Alliance
- In office c. May 2012 – c. 2016 Serving with Kay Murray
- Preceded by: Andrew McKenzie
- Succeeded by: Position vacant

Personal details
- Born: Kevin Thomas Campbell; 1949 (age 76–77) Addington, New Zealand
- Party: Alliance
- Spouse: Kathryn
- Profession: Police officer Solicitor

Kevin Thomas Campbell (born 1949) is a former New Zealand member of parliament for the Alliance, and the party's leader outside of Parliament at its deregistration in May 2015.

== Early career ==
Campbell worked as a milkman, before becoming a police officer. He trained to be a Catholic priest at Holy Name Seminary and Holy Cross College. However he was not ordained. Prior to entering Parliament he qualified as a Barrister and Solicitor and practiced in criminal law.

== Member of Parliament ==
New Zealand Parliament
Years	Term	Electorate	List	Party
1999–2002	46th	List	10	Alliance

Campbell was the Alliance candidate for the 1998 Taranaki-King Country by-election, and claimed to have "played some small part in bringing about the closer working relationship between Labour and the Alliance as a result of that by-election."

He was a member of the Alliance, having been elected to Parliament as a list MP in the 1999 election, where he stood in the Taranaki-King Country electorate and was placed tenth on the Alliance list.

In April 2002, the Alliance party split between a moderate faction and a leftist faction, with Campbell remaining with the Alliance as part of the latter. He initially committed to appearing on the Alliance's party list but withdrew on 11 June 2002. The party lost representation due to not reaching the 5% vote threshold.

== Life after Parliament ==
Since leaving Parliament, Campbell has worked as a Supervising Solicitor at Community Law Canterbury. Campbell ran again as an Alliance candidate in the Wigram electorate, seeking to be the replacement for out-going MP Jim Anderton but lost, coming fourth, to Megan Woods, a former member of the Alliance & Progressive parties standing on a Labour ticket.

In 2012, he was elected co-leader of the party. The Alliance deregistered in 2015 and Campbell ceased being a co-leader sometime later, however, the date is not yet known. The party was noted as having co-leaders as late as 2016, however, it is not known if one of these was Campbell as he was not explicitly named.

In June 2026, the reformed Alliance Party announced that Campbell would stand as a candidate for the Rangitīkei electorate in the 2026 election. However, in August, the party announced that he had pulled out from the election, citing health concerns.
