= Waikanae =

Town in Wellington Region, New Zealand

- Medium urban area
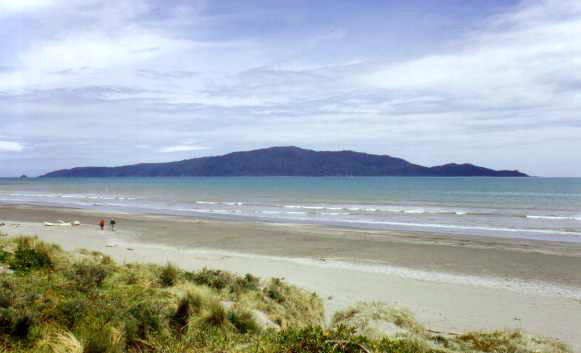
- Kapiti Island seen from Waikanae Beach
- Interactive map of Waikanae
- Coordinates: 40°52′30″S 175°03′50″E
- Country: New Zealand
- Region: Wellington Region
- Territorial authority: Kāpiti Coast District
- Ward: Waikanae Ward
- Community: Waikanae Community
- Electorates: Kapiti; Te Tai Hauāuru (Māori)

Government
  - Territorial Authority: Kāpiti Coast District Council
  - Regional council: Greater Wellington Regional Council
  - Kāpiti Coast Mayor: Janet Holborow
  - Kapiti MP: Tim Costley
  - Te Tai Hauāuru MP: Debbie Ngarewa-Packer

Area
  - Total: 19.59 km^{2} (7.56 sq mi)

Population (June 2025)
  - Total: 13,600
  - Density: 694/km^{2} (1,800/sq mi)

Waikanae (English: /ˌwaɪkəˈnaɪ/, Māori pronunciation: [ˈwaikaˈnae]) is a town on the Kāpiti Coast, 60 km (37 mi) north of the Wellington, New Zealand. The name is a Māori word meaning "waters" (wai) "of the grey mullet".

The area surrounding the town is notable for its 2.4-kilometre-long (1.5 mi) beach, the Waikanae River estuary, the Kapiti Marine Reserve, and Kapiti Island, which lies 4 km (2.5 mi) offshore in the Tasman Sea. The town is considered one of the top retirement destinations in the Wellington Region, because of it having year-round mild temperatures, moderate rainfall, and less wind than Wellington.

The town is 8 km (5.0 mi) northeast of Paraparaumu, and 15 km (9.3 mi) southwest of Ōtaki. The Waikanae railway station is the northernmost station in the Metlink passenger rail network, linking with Wellington railway station in Central Wellington.

== Geography ==
Waikanae lies in a setting of open farmland and forest between the Tasman Sea and the rugged Tararua Range. Prior to human settlement the Waikanae coastal plain comprised wetlands divided by a complex pattern of natural waterways and kohekohe wooded regions.

Together with its neighbouring settlement of Waikanae Beach, the town comprises a quiet locale, popular with families and retirees. Just north of Waikanae is the small community of Peka Peka.

The area surrounding the town is notable for its beach, the Waikanae River estuary and Kapiti Island, which lies 4 km (2.5 mi) offshore in the Tasman Sea. Waikanae Beach is approximately 2.4 km (1.5 mi) long from the Waikanae River estuary to the Waimeha Stream. The eastern section of the Kapiti Marine Reserve lies between Kapiti Island and Waikanae Beach, and adjoins the Waikanae Estuary Scientific Reserve. Whales and Hector's dolphins are sometimes spotted on their migration routes through the narrow corridor.

Inland, to the east of Waikanae are the bush clad Hemi Matenga Reserve, the Tararua Ranges and the Akatarawa Valley, home to a conservation park, Staglands Wildlife Reserve & Cafe. A road through the valley over the Akatarawa Saddle provides a link with the Hutt Valley via Reikorangi and Cloustonville. The headwaters of the Waikanae River form where a number of streams converge in the inland Reikorangi Basin. From here the river runs through a gap in the foothills, across the coastal plain and sand dunes to the sea.

=== Climate ===
The Tararua Range provides shelter for Waikanae from the south and east, as does Kapiti Island from the west. The area accordingly escapes the heavy winds and storms of the neighbouring Cook Strait region. The shallow depths of Waikanae Beach produces a higher water temperature than the steeper coastlines of Wellington harbour to the south. The prevailing wind blows from the north-west, which drives rain-clouds inland to the ranges and results in high rainfalls during the winter and spring.

Climate data for Waikanae
Month	Jan	Feb	Mar	Apr	May	Jun	Jul	Aug	Sep	Oct	Nov	Dec	Year
Mean daily maximum °C (°F)	17.5 (63.5)	18.0 (64.4)	17.1 (62.8)	15.6 (60.1)	14.1 (57.4)	12.3 (54.1)	11.3 (52.3)	11.3 (52.3)	12.1 (53.8)	13.0 (55.4)	14.3 (57.7)	16.2 (61.2)	14.4 (57.9)
Daily mean °C (°F)	16.3 (61.3)	16.8 (62.2)	15.9 (60.6)	14.4 (57.9)	13.0 (55.4)	11.3 (52.3)	10.2 (50.4)	10.3 (50.5)	11.0 (51.8)	11.9 (53.4)	13.2 (55.8)	15.2 (59.4)	13.3 (55.9)
Mean daily minimum °C (°F)	15.1 (59.2)	15.6 (60.1)	14.6 (58.3)	13.2 (55.8)	11.8 (53.2)	10.1 (50.2)	9.1 (48.4)	9.1 (48.4)	9.8 (49.6)	10.7 (51.3)	12.0 (53.6)	14.0 (57.2)	12.1 (53.8)
Average precipitation mm (inches)	96.6 (3.80)	108.6 (4.28)	97.4 (3.83)	128.1 (5.04)	146.6 (5.77)	153.0 (6.02)	139.0 (5.47)	151.1 (5.95)	148.1 (5.83)	156.8 (6.17)	127.0 (5.00)	149.6 (5.89)	1,601.9 (63.05)
Source: Weather.Directory

== History and culture ==
Archaeological and ethnographical research suggests that Waikanae may have been first inhabited by the Waitaha moa-hunters as early as a thousand years ago. Successive waves of settlement by the Ngāti Apa, Rangitāne and Muaūpoko iwi (tribal groups) ensured that the area continues to have major historic and mythological significance for the Māori people of New Zealand. See Kāpiti Coast for greater detail.

In 1824, Waikanae Beach was the embarkation point for a force of 2,000 to 3,000 fighters from coastal iwi, who assembled with the intention of taking Kapiti Island from the Ngāti Toa led by Te Rauparaha. Crossing the strait in a fleet of waka canoes under shelter of darkness, the attackers were met and destroyed as they disembarked at the northern end of Kapiti Island.

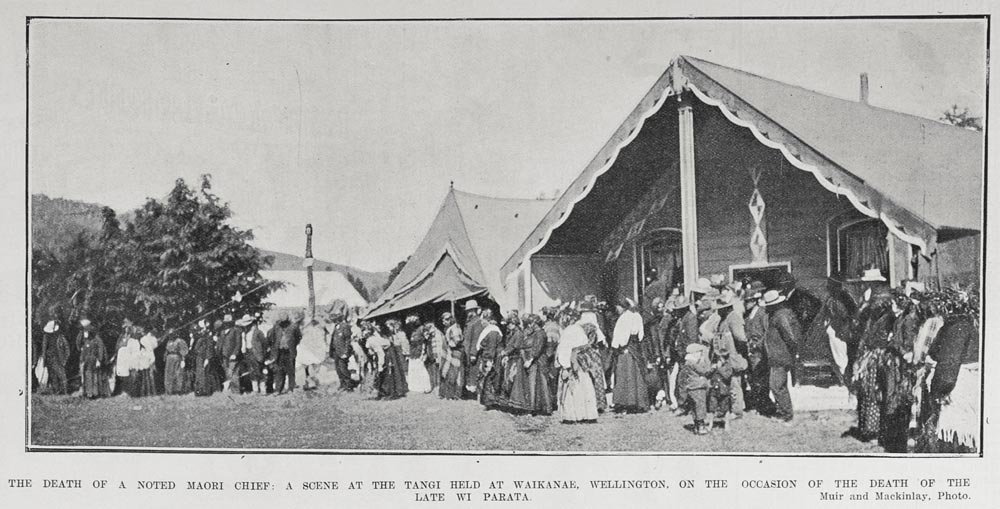
The tangi for Minister of the Crown Wi Parata was held at Waikanae Marae in 1906

=== Marae ===
Whakarongotai Marae is located in Waikanae. It is a marae (social and cultural meeting ground) for Te Atiawa ki Whakarongotai and includes the Whakarongotai or Puku Mahi Tamariki wharenui (meeting house).

== Reserves ==
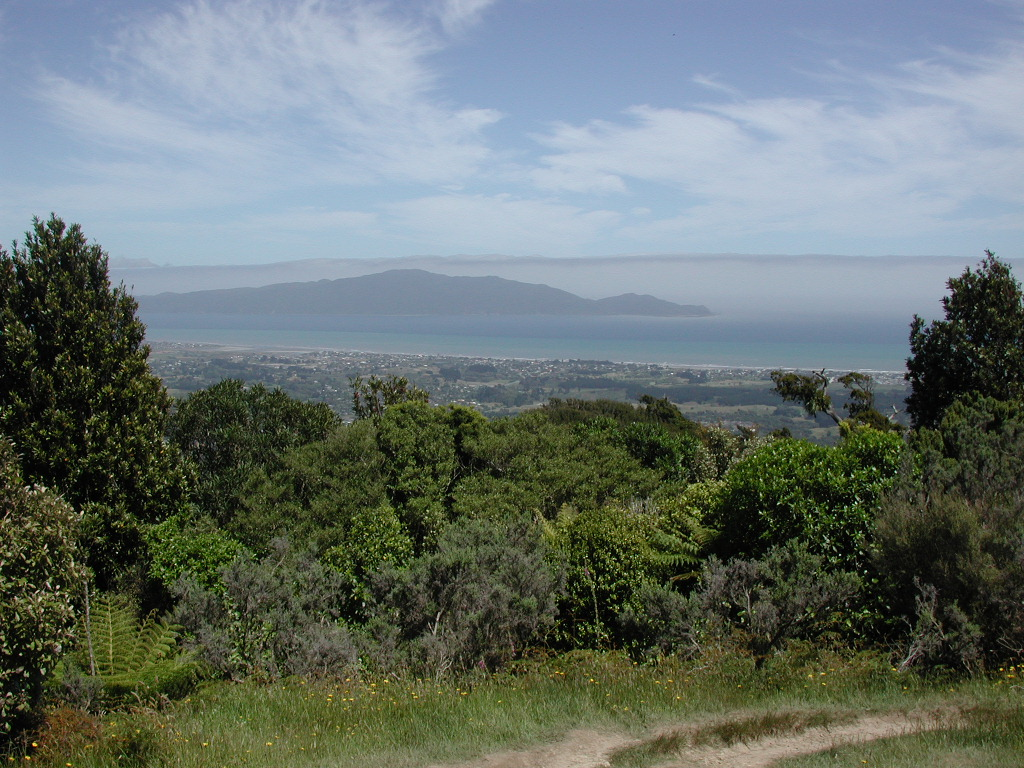
Waikanae seen from Hemi Matenga Reserve

Waikanae Beach is a habitat for terns, seagulls, oystercatchers, and stilts. Inland wetlands provide habitat for pūkeko, crake and New Zealand dabchicks. White fronted herons, tūī and shags range across the coastal plain. The ready availability of both birdlife and seafood encouraged early Māori settlement of the area. Introduced species such as ducks and black swans have also flourished over the last century.

=== Wildlife reserves ===
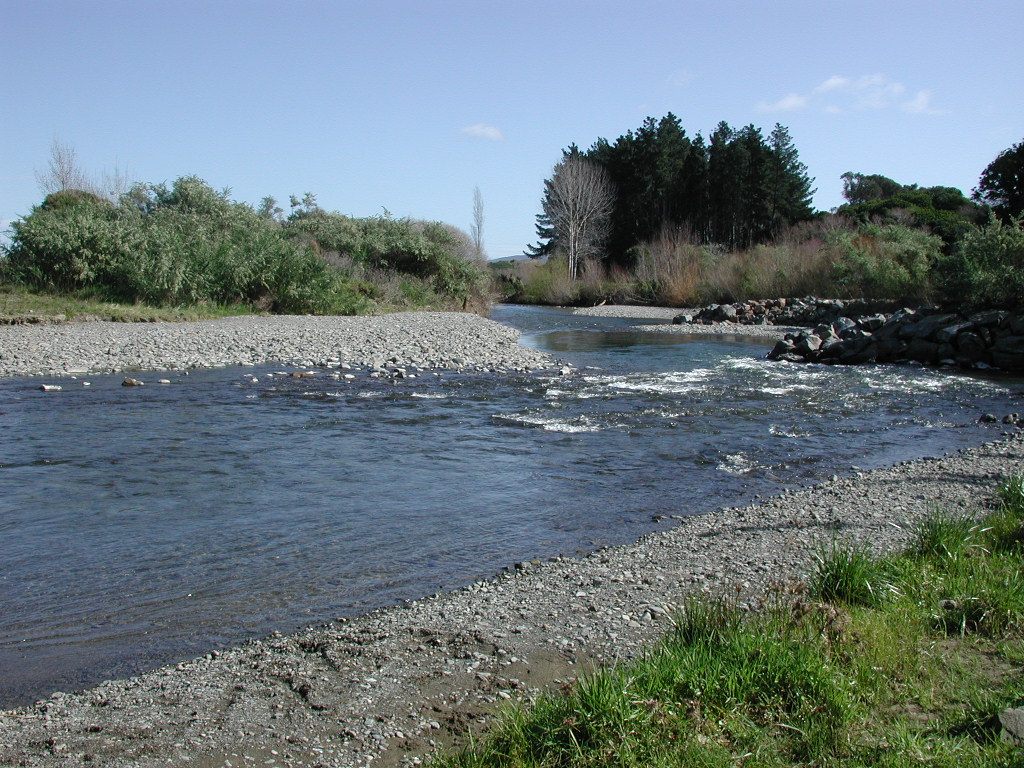
Waikanae River

The Waikanae Estuary Scientific Reserve is a nationally–significant reserve located at the mouth of the Waikanae River. The reserve was established in 1987 to protect the large number of bird species that use the area.

Ngā Manu Nature Reserve is a 14 hectares (35 acres) reserve located north of the town. It preserves the largest remnant of coastal lowland swamp forest on the Kāpiti Coast, and is a popular visitor attraction. Pharazyn Reserve is located to the north of the Waikanae Beach settlement, adjacent to the Te Harakeke Swamp, a regionally significant area of harakeke and raupō wetland. The site was originally established as a sewage treatment plant in the 1970s, but was decommissioned in 2002. A long term environmental restoration project was commenced to restore the site as a recreation and wildlife reserve. The site is now described as one of the top 10 birdwatching sites in the Wellington region.

=== Hemi Matenga Memorial Scenic Reserve ===
To the east of Waikanae is the heavily forested 330 ha (820 acres) Hemi Matenga Reserve covering a range overlooking the town itself. Rising to 514 metres above sea level, the forest comprises one of the most extensive areas of kohekohe woodland left in New Zealand. The reserve was named after its former owner; Hemi Matenga Waipunahau of the Ngāti Toa, following his death in 1912. It is traversed by several walking tracks and forms an extension of the Tararua Range.

== Demographics ==
Waikanae is described by Statistics New Zealand as a medium urban area, which covers 19.59 km^{2} (7.56 sq mi). It had an estimated population of 13,600 as of June 2025, with a population density of 694.23 people per km^{2}.

Historical population
Year	Pop.	±% p.a.
2006	10,206	—
2013	10,602	+0.55%
2018	12,099	+2.68%
2023	12,966	+1.39%

Waikanae had a population of 12,966 in the 2023 New Zealand census, an increase of 867 people (7.2%) since the 2018 census, and an increase of 2,364 people (22.3%) since the 2013 census. There were 6,012 males, 6,903 females, and 51 people of other genders in 5,727 dwellings. 3.1% of people identified as LGBTIQ+. The median age was 54.8 years (compared with 38.1 years nationally). There were 1,815 people (14.0%) aged under 15 years, 1,386 (10.7%) aged 15 to 29, 5,073 (39.1%) aged 30 to 64, and 4,692 (36.2%) aged 65 or older.

People could identify as more than one ethnicity. The results were 89.7% European (Pākehā); 9.9% Māori; 2.7% Pasifika; 6.0% Asian; 0.8% Middle Eastern, Latin American and African New Zealanders (MELAA); and 2.6% other, which includes people giving their ethnicity as "New Zealander". English was spoken by 98.2%, Māori by 1.9%, Samoan by 0.3%, and other languages by 10.3%. No language could be spoken by 1.4% (e.g. too young to talk). New Zealand Sign Language was known by 0.4%. The percentage of people born overseas was 26.1, compared with 28.8% nationally.

Religious affiliations were 37.1% Christian, 0.5% Hindu, 0.3% Islam, 0.3% Māori religious beliefs, 0.4% Buddhist, 0.7% New Age, 0.1% Jewish, and 1.3% other religions. People who answered that they had no religion were 52.6%, and 6.9% of people did not answer the census question.

Of those at least 15 years old, 3,360 (30.1%) people had a bachelor's or higher degree, 5,613 (50.3%) had a post-high school certificate or diploma, and 2,175 (19.5%) people exclusively held high school qualifications. The median income was $37,600, compared with $41,500 nationally. 1,557 people (14.0%) earned over $100,000 compared to 12.1% nationally. The employment status of those at least 15 was 4,368 (39.2%) full-time, 1,530 (13.7%) part-time, and 171 (1.5%) unemployed.

Individual statistical areas
Name	Area (km^{2})	Population	Density (per km^{2})	Dwellings	Median age	Median income
Waikanae Beach	4.37	3,249	743	1,437	52.6 years	$42,800
Waikanae Park	7.37	2,427	329	1,062	55.1 years	$38,400
Waikanae West	4.68	4,755	1,016	2,208	59.9 years	$33,400
Waikanae East	3.19	2,535	795	1,020	50.7 years	$40,000
New Zealand					38.1 years	$41,500

It was forecast in 2012 that Waikanae's relative abundance of unoccupied land and recent or pending improvements in transport links will lead to a population increase to about 15,000 by 2032.

== Government ==
Local government for the town is provided by the Kāpiti Coast District Council. Waikanae is one of the five electoral wards of the District Council. The Waikanae Community Board represents the area from Waikanae Downs in the south through to Te Horo in the north. The community board has an advocacy role, and also administers local grant funding.

Greater Wellington Regional Council is responsible for regional governance of the district and the wider region, including public transport, water and environmental management.

== Facilities ==
The central Waikanae village includes two supermarkets, the Toi Mahara gallery, three bank branches, a health centre, three pharmacies, a post shop, a war memorial hall, a smaller community hall, the Kapiti Coast Museum, a church, a public library, a cinema and a number of other shops, restaurants, and businesses. There are two primary schools (see below), a golf course, bowling club, and several retirement centres.

Mahara Gallery is an art gallery opened in 1996. It was renovated in 2023 and renamed "Toi Mahara".

Te Araroa (the country's long-distance walking trail) leads through Waikanae.

=== Sport ===
Waikanae Park is a cricket ground. It held its first List A match when Central Districts played Auckland in the 1993/94 Shell Cup. The ground later held five further List A matches, the last of which came in the 2004/05 State Shield when Central Districts played Wellington. Central Districts Women used Waikanae Park as a home venue in two fixtures in the 2001/02 State League.

== Housing ==
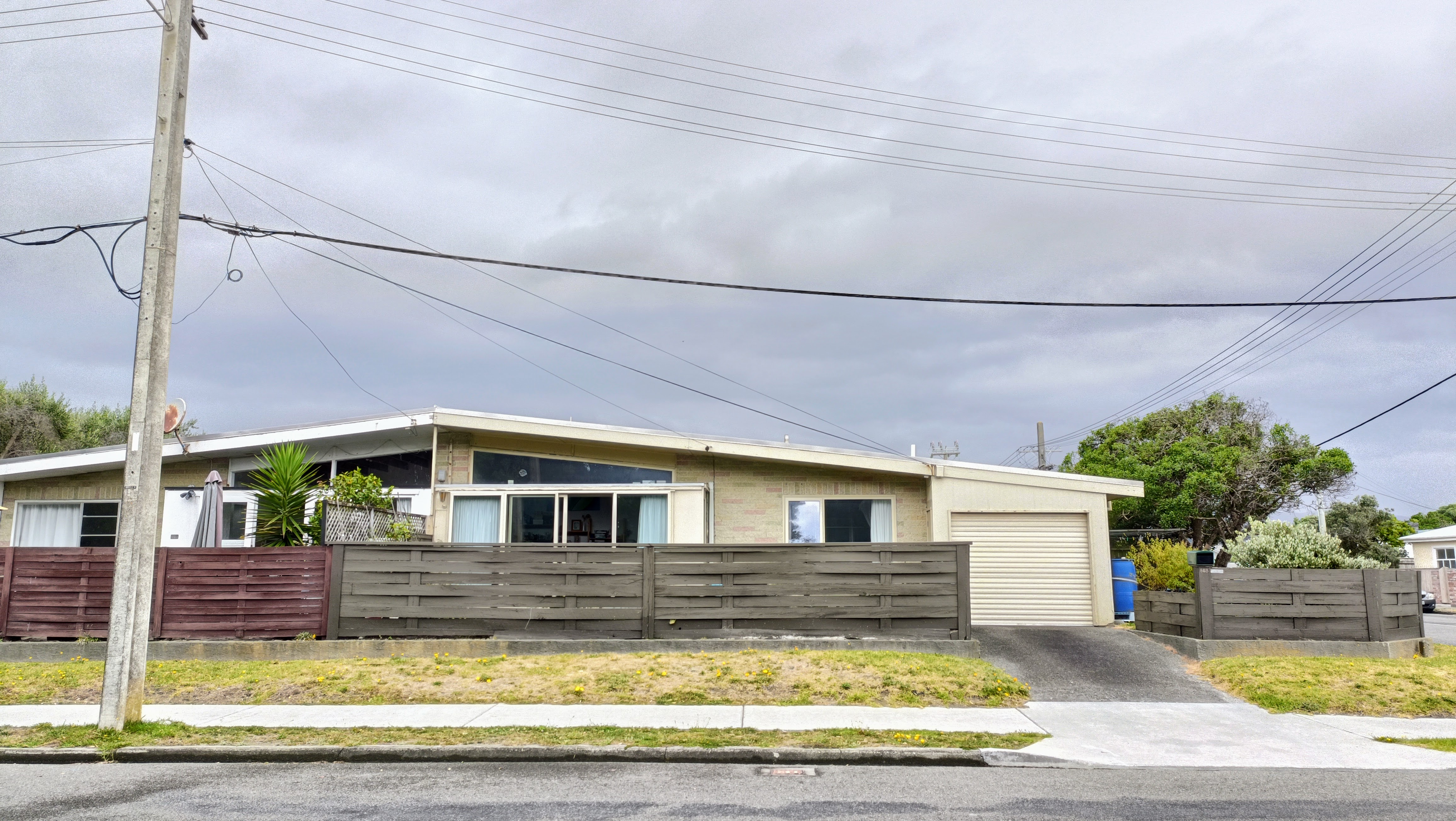
A house near Waikanae Beach

Waikanae is the largest of the 14 residential suburbs which lie within the Territorial Authority of the Kāpiti Coast, in terms of the total number of residential properties. The greater portion of Waikanae's houses were constructed during the period 1970–1979.

Development of numerous private gardens has led at one point to Waikanae having one of the highest levels of water consumption per head of population in New Zealand. The community draws its water from the single source of the Waikanae River, and seasonal shortages during the warmer months of the year constitute a growing problem for the area. Planning for new residential development has specifically included the need to meet water supply needs.

== Transport ==
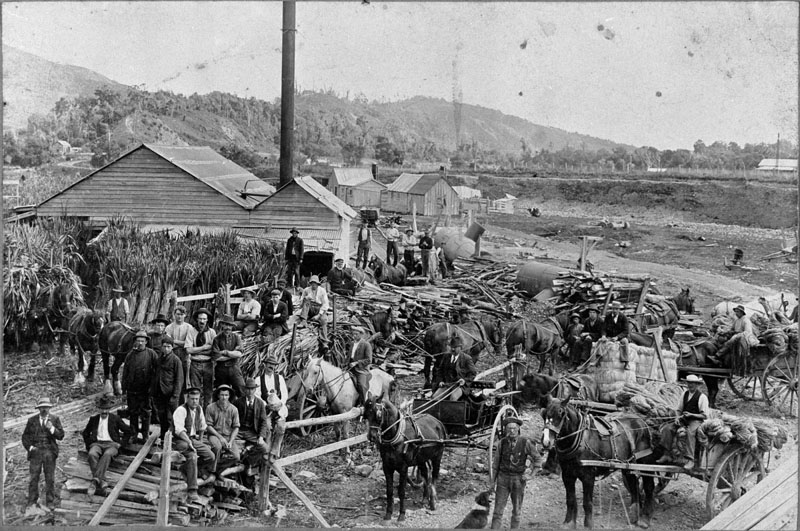
Stansells' flax mill, Waikanae c. 1900. The mill relied on horse-power to bring in the flax, and the railway to send it to market.

The town is located on State Highway 1 and the North Island Main Trunk railway. In February 2017 the Kāpiti Expressway was opened to enable State Highway 1 to bypass the centre of the township. The opening of the Transmission Gully Motorway increased accessibility to the town for commuters travelling to and from Wellington.

The town is the current northern terminus of the Kāpiti Line for the Metlink commuter rail service. This service has operated since February 2011, into the newly rebuilt Waikanae Railway Station. The new Matangi electric multiple units entered service at the same time in 2011. Prior to that, the only direct commuter train to Wellington was the Capital Connection from Palmerston North which still leaves for Wellington in the morning and returns in the evening en route to Palmerston North.

Local bus services link Waikanae Village with Waikanae Beach and Ōtaki.

== Local media ==
A radio station Beach FM 106.3 broadcasts from Waikanae Village, covering the Kāpiti and Horowhenua districts. The local newspaper Kāpiti Observer provides coverage of the Kāpiti region.

== Education ==
Waikanae School is a co-educational state primary school for Year 1 to 8 students, with a roll of 457 as of July 2026. It opened in 1896. The closure of Reikorangi School (opened 1889) in 1969 substantially increased the roll of Waikanae School.

Kapakapanui School is also a co-educational state primary school for Year 1 to 8 students, with a roll of 497. It opened in 1978 as Kapanui School, and changed its name to Kapakapanui School in 2020.

== Notable people ==
- Erunui Matioro Te Tupe-o-Tu: retired to Waikanae after a life as a tribal leader, warrior, whaler, slaver, and sealer; during the early colonial period from the 1820s to the 1850s.
- Jim Bolger (1935–2025), former New Zealand Prime Minister
- Joan Bolger, wife of Jim Bolger
- Mary Cresswell, poet
- Thomas (goose), a goose who lived on the Waimanu Lagoons

== See also ==
- Waikanae River

== Sources cited ==
- Maclean, Chris; Maclean, Joan (2010). Waikanae (2nd ed.). Whitcombe Press. ISBN 978-0-473-16597-0.
