= King Country (electorate) =

King Country was a New Zealand parliamentary electorate. It existed from 1972 to 1996 and was represented by Jim Bolger of the National Party for those 24 years.

== Population centres ==
Since the 1969 election, the number of electorates in the South Island was fixed at 25, with continued faster population growth in the North Island leading to an increase in the number of general electorates. There were 84 electorates for the 1969 election, and the 1972 electoral redistribution saw three additional general seats created for the North Island, bringing the total number of electorates to 87. Together with increased urbanisation in Christchurch and Nelson, the changes proved very disruptive to existing electorates. In the South Island, three electorates were abolished, and three electorates were newly created. In the North Island, five electorates were abolished, two electorates were recreated, and six electorates were newly created (including King Country).

The King Country electorate was formed from area that previously belonged to the Waimarino and Waitomo electorates, which were both abolished. The King Country electorate covered a largely rural area with a dispersed population. It has no cities. The largest towns are Ōtorohanga and Te Kūiti.

== History ==
The previous representative of the Waimarino electorate was Roy Jack who transferred to the enlarged Rangitikei electorate in 1972. David Seath had held the Waitomo electorate since 1954 and he retired in 1972. This gave Jim Bolger the opportunity to stand in the new King Country electorate when it was formed in 1972, and the area being a traditional stronghold for National, he won the election with ease. Bolger became Prime Minister in 1990 while representing the King Country electorate.

The electorate combined with the adjacent rural electorate of Taranaki in 1996 to form the Taranaki-King Country electorate for MMP.

== Election results ==
Key

National

| Election | Winner |
|---|---|
| 1972 election | Jim Bolger |
| 1975 election | Jim Bolger |
| 1978 election | Jim Bolger |
| 1981 election | Jim Bolger |
| 1984 election | Jim Bolger |
| 1987 election | Jim Bolger |
| 1990 election | Jim Bolger |
| 1993 election | Jim Bolger |
(Electorate abolished in 1996; see Taranaki-King Country)

=== 1993 election ===
1993 general election: King Country
| Party | Candidate | Votes | % | ±% |
|---|---|---|---|---|
| National | Jim Bolger | 8,396 | 51.8 | −12.6 |
| Labour | Murray Simpson | 3,890 | 24.0 | |
| Alliance | Ian Herbert | 3,518 | 21.7 | |
| Christian Heritage | Mark Anthony Jones | 539 | 3.3 | |
| McGillicuddy Serious | Anand Hasyo | 220 | 1.3 | |
| Natural Law | Euan Frederick Williams | 115 | 0.7 | |
| Majority | | 4,506 | 27.8 | −17.2 |
| Turnout | | 16,678 | | |

=== 1990 election ===
1990 general election: King Country
| Party | Candidate | Votes | % | ±% |
|---|---|---|---|---|
| National | Jim Bolger | 10,406 | 64.4 | +0.2 |
| Labour | Cameron Gordon | 3,132 | 19.4 | |
| Green | Laurence Cadman | 1,368 | 8.4 | |
| NewLabour | Dion Martin | 497 | 3.0 | |
| Social Credit | Mervyn Williamson | 496 | 3.0 | |
| McGillicuddy Serious | Craig Louis Simmons | 107 | 0.6 | |
| Democrats | Steven Wilton | 77 | 0.4 | |
| Imperial British Conservative | Kate McDonald | 53 | | |
| Majority | | 7,274 | 45.0 | +10.1 |
| Turnout | | 16,136 | | |

=== 1987 election ===
1987 general election: King Country
| Party | Candidate | Votes | % | ±% |
|---|---|---|---|---|
| National | Jim Bolger | 10,942 | 64.2 | +9.1 |
| Labour | Leo Menefy | 4,988 | 29.3 | |
| Democrats | Wayne Morris | 1,115 | 6.5 | |
| Majority | | 5,954 | 34.9 | +4.1 |
| Turnout | | 20,143 | 86.4 | −4.6 |

=== 1984 election ===
1984 general election: King Country
| Party | Candidate | Votes | % | ±% |
|---|---|---|---|---|
| National | Jim Bolger | 10,040 | 55.1 | +6.0 |
| Labour | Jim Simons | 4,423 | 24.3 | |
| Social Credit | Derek Mason | 2,027 | 11.1 | −24.6 |
| NZ Party | Graham Short | 1,580 | 8.7 | |
| Values | Peter Winter | 139 | 0.8 | |
| Majority | | 5,617 | 30.8 | +17.4 |
| Turnout | | 20,477 | 91.0 | +5.0 |

=== 1981 election ===
1981 general election: King Country
| Party | Candidate | Votes | % | ±% |
|---|---|---|---|---|
| National | Jim Bolger | 7,937 | 49.1 | +4.5 |
| Social Credit | Derek Mason | 5,779 | 35.7 | +9.2 |
| Labour | Pai Tahere | 2,460 | 15.2 | |
| Majority | | 2,158 | 13.4 | −4.7 |
| Turnout | | 18,878 | 86.0 | +21.5 |

=== 1978 election ===
1978 general election: King Country
| Party | Candidate | Votes | % | ±% |
|---|---|---|---|---|
| National | Jim Bolger | 6,804 | 44.6 | −11.5 |
| Labour | Leo Menefy | 4,034 | 26.5 | |
| Social Credit | Derek Mason | 3,997 | 26.2 | +15.4 |
| Values | R Azariah | 409 | 2.7 | |
| Majority | | 2,770 | 18.1 | −8.2 |
| Turnout | | 23,726 | 64.5 | −15.8 |

=== 1975 election ===
1975 general election: King Country
| Party | Candidate | Votes | % | ±% |
|---|---|---|---|---|
| National | Jim Bolger | 9,180 | 56.1 | +8.1 |
| Labour | Thomas David Varnham | 4,864 | 29.8 | |
| Social Credit | Derek Mason | 1,759 | 10.8 | +1.7 |
| Values | Richard Osborn | 546 | 3.3 | |
| Majority | | 4,316 | 26.3 | +17.9 |
| Turnout | | 20,440 | 80.3 | −7.2 |

=== 1972 election ===
1972 general election: King Country
| Party | Candidate | Votes | % | ±% |
|---|---|---|---|---|
| National | Jim Bolger | 7,107 | 48.0 | |
| Labour | Bruce Sakey | 5,867 | 39.6 | |
| Social Credit | Derek Mason | 1,351 | 9.1 | |
| Liberal Reform | Saxby John Telfer | 191 | 1.3 | |
| Independent | Richard Alan Soundy | 185 | 1.3 | |
| New Democratic | John Norman | 111 | 0.7 | |
| Majority | | 1,240 | 8.4 | |
| Turnout | | 17,014 | 87.5 | |
