= Te Ao-tū-tahanga and Manu-kaihonge =

Te Ao-tū-tahanga and Manu-kaihonge were Māori rangatira (chieftains) in the Tainui tribal confederation, based at Moehau in Coromandel, New Zealand. They probably lived in the seventeenth century.

== Lives ==
Te Ao-tū-tahanga and Manu-kaihonge were sons of Māhanga, through whom they were direct descendants of Hoturoa, the captain of the Tainui. Their mother was Māhanga's third wife, Te Akatāwhia, daughter of Rongomai of Ngāti Rongoū. They had a number of older half-siblings in Waikato and one full brother, Pare-moehau, who grew up with them at Moehau. Some accounts make Reitū and Reipae sisters or daughters of Te Ao-tū-tahanga, but there are also several alternative traditions.

=== War with Ngāti Huarere ===
When they were still young, their elderly father was murdered by Ngāti Huarere at Tūtū-kākā (modern Thames), while returning to Moehau from a visit to the Waikato, in revenge for an earlier attack on them.

When they had grown up, Te Ao-tū-tahanga and Manu-kaihonge decided to gather a war-party to get revenge on the Ngāti Huarere at Tūtū-kākā. Therefore, Te Ao-tū-tahanga travelled into the Waikato, to Mount Pirongia, where he convinced a number of his half-brothers – Tūpana, Rua-teatea, Pōtaua, and Atutahi – to join the expedition.

The forces gathered on an island, while the Ngāti Haurere made camp on the shore opposite. There was no water on the island and as the forces prepared for battle, Te Ao-tū-tahanga's infant son started crying for water. Manu-kaihonge boldly declared that he would go to the mainland and fetch water for the baby and paddled over in his canoe with a small group. When they got to the shore, Ngāti Huarere let them pass, planning to ambush them on their way back to the boat. However, on the way back, Manu-kaihonge realised that he was about to be ambushed so he shouted and struck his water-gourd with his taiaha spear, terrifying the Ngāti Huarere, who mistook the sound for the smashing of skulls. They turned to flee and Manu-kaihonge's men killed them as they routed.

In subsequent battles, Te Ao-tū-tahanga and Manu-kaihonge inflicted further defeats on the Ngāti Huarere, and, as a result, Ngāti Huarere was wiped out.

== Sources ==
The story of Te Ao-tū-tahanga and Manu-kaihonge is recorded by Pei Te Hurinui Jones, based on oral accounts which he heard from Aihe Huirama and Te Nguha Huirama in 1932, and from Waata Roore Erueti of Ngāti Māhanga, who told it to him in June 1942.

== Bibliography ==
- Jones, Pei Te Hurinui; Biggs, Bruce (2004). Ngā iwi o Tainui : nga koorero tuku iho a nga tuupuna = The traditional history of the Tainui people. Auckland [N.Z.]: Auckland University Press. ISBN 1869403312.
