= Tamainu-pō =

Māori chieftain

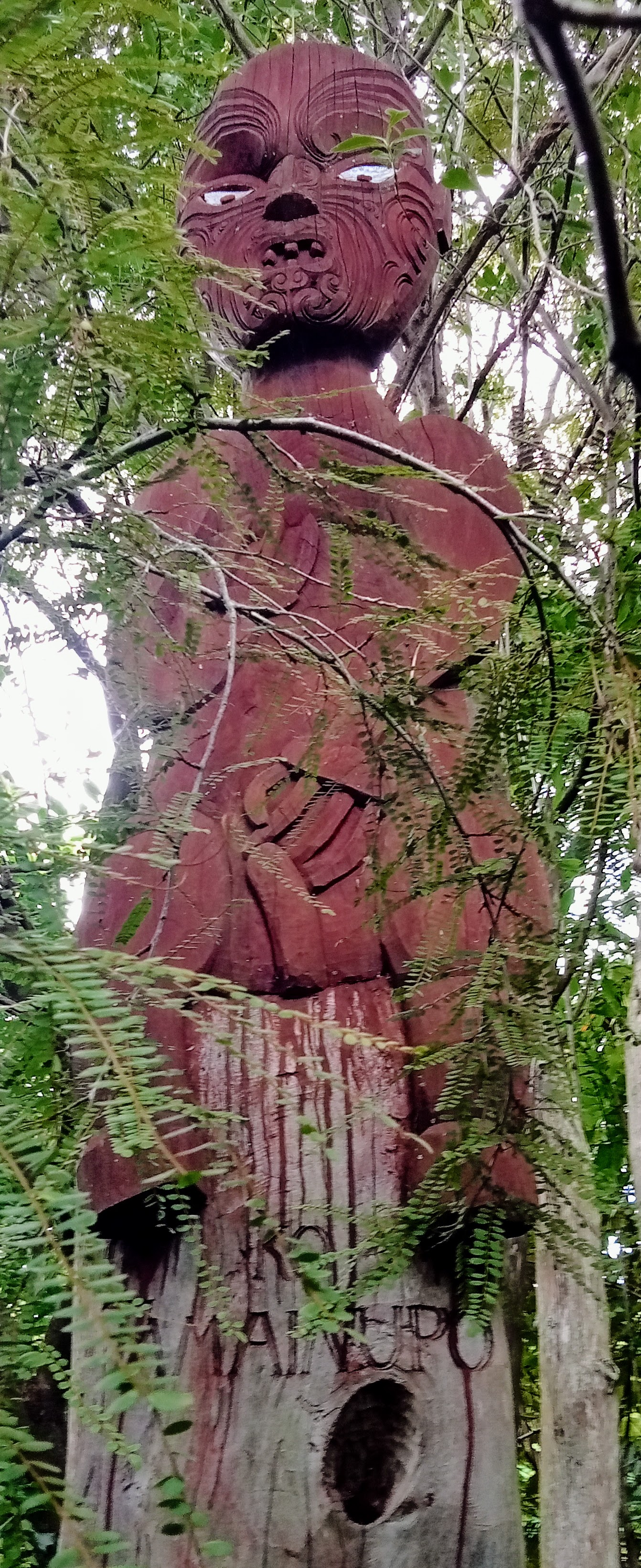
Depiction of Tamainu-pō on the fence of Te Parapara Māori garden, Hamilton Gardens.

Tamainu-pō was a Māori rangatira (chieftain) of the Tainui tribal confederation in the Waikato region of New Zealand and the ancestor of the Ngāti Tamainupō hapū. He probably lived around 1600.

== Life ==
Kāwhia beach.

Tamainu-pō was the son of Whaea-tāpoko, a female rangatira based at Kāwhia, who belonged to Ngāti Taupiri. She was raped in the night by Kōkako, a Waikato Tainui chieftain of Ngāti Ruanui and Mātaatua descent. Tamainu-pō's name, which means 'Son-of-the-drink-by-night', was given by his father in reference to the rape. He grew up around Kāwhia Harbour and his mother only revealed his parentage to him when he was a young adult. He had an older half-brother, Taiko, and a sister, Maikao, who married Ta-nanga-whanga, a rangatira of Ngā Iwi.

=== Flight to Pokohuka ===
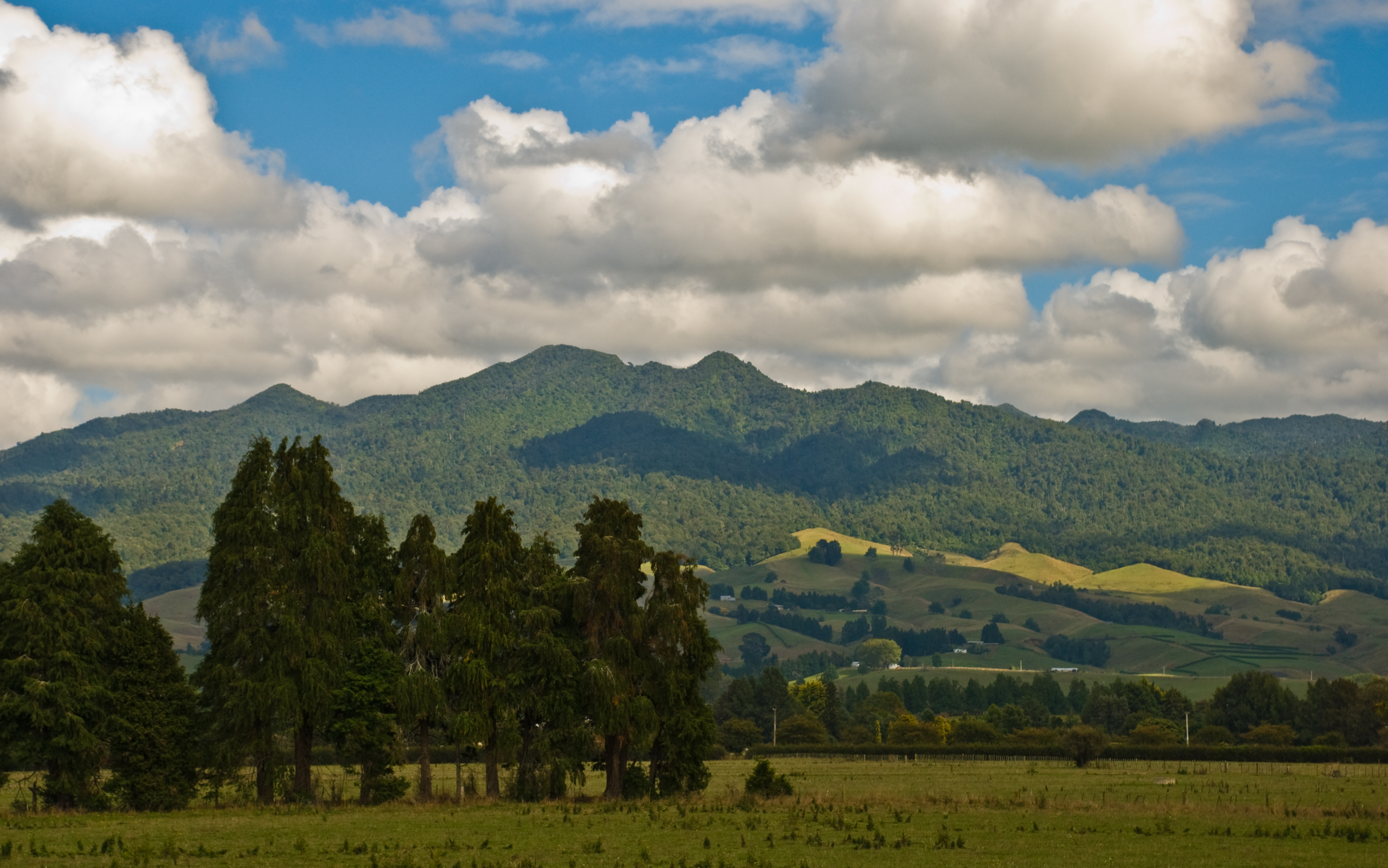
Mount Pirongia.

One day, when the young man was playing teka (a form of darts) with his friends, one of the darts fell into a kumara pit and Tamainu-pō went to collect it. There he found his sister-in-law, wife of his elder brother, Taiko. The lady called him down into the pit, revealed the dart held between her thighs, and when Tamainu-pō went to take it, she had sex with him.

Taiko was out fishing, but he found out about the adultery, because his fish hook had been fouled and one of the feathers from Tamainu-pō's cloak was left in the kumara pit. Taiko confronted Tamainu-pō in the gardens, attacking him with his koikoi spear, but Tamainu-pō parried with his digging stick, until their mother Whaea-tāpoko arrived and broke up the fight.

Tamainu-pō fled to the harbour, where one of his elderly relatives was carving a canoe. The elder hid him under the canoe and because a canoe under construction is tapu, the party pursuing Tamainu-pō did not check underneath it and took the elder's word that he had not seen Tamainu-pō. Tamainu-pō crossed the harbour to Te Taharoa, where an elder sung a karakia over him and sent him along a ridge of Mount Pirongia, saying that he would know he was safe when a storm came upon him. Tamainu-pō followed the route towards Ōpārau, past Te Awaroa and up onto the Pokohuka ridge, the site of Kāwhia's mauri manu ('bird talisman'), where the storm caught him.

=== Courtship of the daughters of Māhanga ===
Places in the life of Tamainu-pō.
1 Kāwhia
2 Pokohuka
3 Kāniwhaniwha / Pūrākau
4 Tai-pōuri island
5 Port Waikato

After the storm, Tamainu-pō and his slave went hunting birds, coming down the Kāniwhaniwha stream to a village called Kāniwhaniwha or Pūrākau, which was located where the stream meets the Waipā River, near modern Te Pahu. The chieftain of this village was Māhanga, son of Tūheitia and a descendant of Hoturoa of the Tainui canoe, according to Pei Te Hurinui Jones. As Tamainu-pō hunted, Māhanga's daughters, Wai-tawake and Tū-kōtuku-rerenga-tahi, caught sight of him up a tree and invited him to come back to their village. The two girls vied with one another to marry Tamainu-pō, but Māhanga, impressed by the large haul of birds that Tamainu-pō had caught, which indicated the power of his karakia (magic spells), and the efficiency with which he distributed the birds to the people, decided in favour of Tū-kōtuku. According to Wiremu Te Wheoro, Wai-tawake angrily fled to the south and married a man of Maniapoto.

=== Battle of Kiri-parera ===
Later on, Kōkako, who had fought with Māhanga's father in Manukau Harbour, came south with a war party and built a fortress at Kiri-parera, just downstream from Kāniwhaniwha. Māhanga assembled his forces and called for his Toko-whitu ('Seven Champions') to leap over his back. None of them could, but Tamainu-pō was able to do it, a sign that he would defeat Kōkako.

When Māhanga's force approached Kiri-parera, they saw Kōkako's forces hiding ready for an ambush near the gateway. Taimainu-pō shouted for them to charge and then used the distraction to sneak over the palisade into the fortress and search for his father. While he was still on the fence, Kōkako's forces broke and fled into their fortress and Tamainu-pō caught sight of his father, recognising him by his red feather-cloak. He leapt down on him, pushed him into the ditch, snatched off his cloak, seized his patu, and then let him go free, without revealing who he was.

After the battle, the Toko-whitu all presented severed heads, claiming that they had killed Kōkako, but they obviously looked nothing like him (Kōkako had distinctive light-coloured hair). Tamainu-pō also brought a head, taken from someone who looked similar to Kōkako, and together with the cloak and patu, this convinced Māhanga that Kōkako was dead.

=== Journey to Kōkako ===
After the birth of his son, however, Taimainu-pō wished for the baby to receive the tohi baptismal ritual from his own father, so he revealed his true parentage and the fact the Kōkako was still alive to his wife, Tū-kōtuku, and to his father-in-law Māhanga, who agreed to let them go, in the hope that Taimainu-pō would forge a peace between him and Kōkako. Then he placed Tamainu-pō, Tū-kōtuku, and the newborn under a tapu, telling them not to get out of their canoe or reply to calls from the banks of the river until they reached their destination. They paddled down the Waipā River and along the Waikato River until they reached Kōkako's new base on the island of Tai-pōuri near Rangiriri on the Waikato River (or Okarahea according to Mohi Te Rongomau).

When they arrived, they walked straight to the largest house. The people cried out that the house was tapu and Kōkako came out to investigate the shouting. Then Tamainu-pō revealed his name, handed Kōkako his patu and cloak, presented his wife and his child. Kōkako led them to the tūāhu altar and performed the tohi ritual for both Tamainu-pō and his newborn son, naming him Wairere. Kōkako agreed to return to Kāniwhaniwha with Tamainu-pō and make peace with Māhanga.

=== Conflict with Ta-nanga-whanga ===
Tamainu-pō's sister Maikao was married to Ta-nanga-whanga of Ngā Iwi, who said to her, "Oh there, perhaps, stand the tree ferns with large / edible hearts of Puke-o-tahinga." This was an insult to Kōkako and Maikao told Tamainu-pō, who gathered a war party and travelled down the Waikato River to Port Waikato, where he met a younger half-brother (unnamed, but Bruce Biggs speculates that he might be Marutūahu). Together they built a fort called Tarata-piko, opposite Ta-nanga-whanga's fort at Pū-tataka. In the night, Tamainu-pō snuck into the fortress, made his way to where Ta-nanga-whanga slept, and decapitated him with Maikao's help. Then his forces attacked and sacked the fortress, capturing many rangatira. Tamainu-pō also captured Maikao's two young sons, gave them the hongi and then murdered them. The murder of the nephews, known as Nga Tokorua a Puaki ('the pair of Puaki'), is proverbial.

== Family ==
Tamainu-pō and Tū-kōtuku had one son, Wairere, who had a number of children:

- Whenu, son of Hinemoa and ancestor of Ngaere and Toroa-ihirua.
- Te Kāhurere, son of Tū-kapua and ancestor of Te Wehi.
- Possibly the twin girls, Reitū and Reipae, who married Ue-oneone and Korowharo respectively, creating a link between Tainui and Ngāpuhi that is considered very important in Tainui whakapapa.

== Sources ==
The story of Tamainu-pō's birth, flight, is recorded by Pei Te Hurinui Jones based on an oral account which he heard from Te Nguha Huirama of Ngāti Tamainu-pō, Ngāti Maniapoto, and Ngāti Te Ata on 24 May 1932. A similar story, attributed to Ngāti Awa sources, but actually derived from an 1871 manuscript by Wiremu Te Wheoro, appears in John White The Ancient History of the Maori: IV Tainui (1888). The story of Tamainu-pō's flight was also reported by Mohi Te Rongomau of Ngāti Hourua and Ngāti Māhanga in the Ōtorohanga Land Court on 23 August 1886. An account reported to Bruce Biggs by Elsie Turnbull recounts the story of the seduction in the kumara pit, but attributes it to Tamainu-pō's father Kōkako and the wife of one Kārewa. The murder of Maikao's children is recounted by Bruce Biggs and by John White, the latter drawing on a Ngāti Mahuta tradition.

== Bibliography ==
- Jones, Pei Te Hurinui; Biggs, Bruce (2004). Ngā iwi o Tainui : nga koorero tuku iho a nga tuupuna = The traditional history of the Tainui people. Auckland [N.Z.]: Auckland University Press. ISBN 1869403312.
- White, John (1888). The Ancient History of the Maori: IV Tainui.
