= Ngāti Pāoa =

Māori iwi (tribe) in Aotearoa New Zealand

- Iwi (tribe) in Māoridom
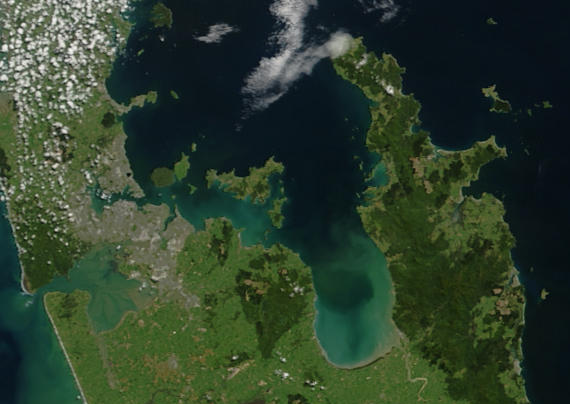
- Hauraki Gulf

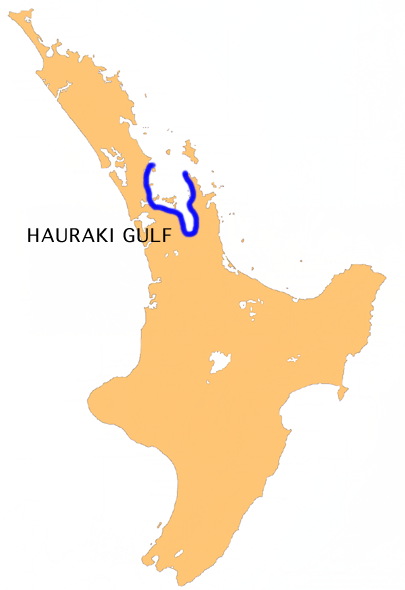
- Rohe (region): Hauraki
- Waka (canoe): Tainui

Ngāti Pāoa is a Māori iwi (tribe) that has extensive links to the Hauraki and Waikato tribes of New Zealand. Its traditional lands stretch from the western side of the Hauraki Plains to Auckland. They also settled on Hauraki Gulf islands such as Waiheke.

Ngāti Pāoa is one of five tribes of the Marutūāhu confederation, the others being Ngāti Maru, Ngāti Rongoū, Ngāti Tamaterā and Ngāti Whanaunga. The Marutūāhu tribes are all descended from Marutūāhu, a son of Hotunui, who is said to have arrived in New Zealand on the Tainui canoe. The Marutūāhu tribes are therefore part of the Tainui group of tribes. The Marutūāhu confederation is also part of the Hauraki collective of tribes.

== History ==
=== Early history ===
Ngāti Pāoa are descended from Pāoa. His story is woven into the history of Tainui waka, and of the Waikato and Hauraki tribes with enduring links to the Te Arawa tribe through the deeds of his grandfather Pikiao. From his previous mariages in his Te Arawa homeland Pikiao's wife had a daughter but could not fulfil his wish for a son to carry his mana forward. He left home when he heard of the charms of a wahine in Waikato. It was in the Pirongia area that Pikiao married Rereiao a high-born Waikato woman descended from Whatihua. His wishes were fulfilled when Rereiao gave him a son Hekemaru who later married Hekeiterangi. They then had two sons, ko Mahuta raua ko Pāoa, he tuakana, he teina (the elder and younger brother), their elder sister Paretahuri was the mataamua of the whanau (the first born of the family). Ngāti Mahuta are descended from Mahuta. Pāoa lived with his first wife Tauhākari, sons Toapoto and Toawhana, and daughter Koura at Kaitotehe, near Taupiri in the central Waikato. Pāoa moved from Kaitotehe to Hauraki, where he married Tukutuku, a granddaughter of Tamaterā, with whom he had sons, Tipa and Horowhenua.

Pāoa and Tukutuku's children lived in and around the Hauraki Plains. Ngāti Pāoa later spread to the western side of the Firth of Thames, from where they also frequented the Hunua Ranges. By the 1700s they also frequented the Tāmaki (Auckland) isthmus, the North Shore and the eastern and northern Coromandel Peninsula.

In about 1780 Ngāti Pāoa established settlements along the western side of the Tamaki River and at Mokoia (present-day Panmure). In 1790 and from 1793 to 1798 they engaged in many battles with tribes to the north, at least as far as the Mahurangi district. By 1805 they were tiring of war and negotiated peace settlements with many neighbouring tribes. At this time they had settlements along the Tamaki River as far as Ōtāhuhu.

=== Modern history ===
In May 2018 the tribe supported the Ngāti Whātua-o-Ōrākei tribe, in their legal case in the Supreme Court.

In December 2018 the Māori Land Court ordered the Ngāti Paoa Iwi Trust and the Ngati Paoa Trust Board, who were contesting control of Ngāti Paoa affairs, into mediation over deciding who should represent the tribe in Resource Management Act and local government matters.

== See also ==
- List of Māori iwi
