= Māhanga =

New Zealand Māori chieftain

Māhanga was a Māori rangatira (chieftain) of the Tainui tribal confederation in the Waikato region of New Zealand, based at Kāniwhaniwha on the Waipā River, and an ancestor of the Ngāti Māhanga and Ngāti Tamainupō hapū. Bruce Briggs estimates that he lived around 1600.

== Life ==
Places in the life of Māhanga.
1 Waikaretu
2 Āwhitu Peninsula
3 Kāniwhaniwha / Pūrākau
4 Tai-pōuri island
5 Moehau
6 Pākihi Island
7 Te Wharauroa
8 Manu-aitu
9 Tūtū-kākā

Māhanga was the son of Tūheitia, a famous warrior, based at Papa-o-rotu in Waikāretu, who was said to have never been attacked at home and was the author of the proverbial saying, "come to me, to the Papa-o-rotu, to the unstirred current, to the pillow that falls not, and the undisturbed sleep. Although I am small, I have teeth." Through Tūheitia, he was descended from Hoturoa, captain of the Tainui canoe.

Tūheitia had come into conflict with Kōkako, a chieftain from Marokopa on the west coast of the Waikato, after the latter led a raiding party down the Waikato River and into Manukau Harbour, where they seized the village of Āwhitu. After some fighting, Kōkako withdrew to Kāwhia, but he later returned to Āwhitu and, according to one account, he drowned Tūheitia there by means of a trick. Māhanga therefore inherited the conflict.

Wiremu Te Wheoro reports that Māhanga was known as "Māhanga who abandons food, who abandons canoes," because he was always moving around and never stayed in one place for long.

=== Settlement at Kāniwhaniwha ===
After some time, Māhanga moved south into the Waikato, settling where the Kāniwhaniwha stream meets the Waipā River, at a village called Kāniwhaniwha, Pūrākau, or Te Kaharoa.

There he had two daughters, Wai-tawake and Tū-kōtuku-rerenga-tahi (the latter at least the daughter of his wife Paratai). One day the two daughters caught sight of a stranger up a tree and invited him to come back to their village. The stranger was Tamainu-pō, an exile from Kāwhia and secretly the son of Kōkako. The two girls instantly vied with one another to marry Tamainu-pō, but Māhanga, impressed by the large haul of birds that Tamainu-pō had caught, which indicated the power of his karakia (magic spells), and the efficiency with which he distributed the birds to the people, decided in favour of Tū-kōtuku. According to Wiremu Te Wheoro, Wai-tawake angrily fled to the south and married a man of Maniapoto. Eventually, Māhanga divided his lands between the two daughters, giving the north to Tū-kōtuku and the south to Wai-tawake (a gender-flipped doublet of the story of Tāwhao and his sons Whatihua and Tūrongo) .

=== Battle of Kiri-parera ===
Sometime later, Kōkako came south with a war party and built a fortress at Kiri-parera, just downstream from Kāniwhaniwha. Therefore, Māhanga assembled his forces and called for his Toko-whitu ('Seven Champions') to leap over his back. None of them could, but Tamainu-pō was able to do it, a sign that he would defeat Kōkako.

When Māhanga's force approached Kiri-parera, they saw Kōkako's forces hiding ready for an ambush near the gateway. Taimainu-pō shouted for them to charge and then used the distraction to sneak over the palisade into the fortress and search for his father. He found him, took his cloak and patu but then let him go free.

After the battle, the Toko-whitu all presented severed heads, claiming that they had killed Kōkako, but they obviously looked nothing like him (Kōkako had distinctive light-coloured hair). Taimainu-pō also brought a head, taken from someone who looked similar to Kōkako, and together with the cloak and patu, this convinced Māhanga that Kōkako was dead.

=== Reconciliation with Kōkako ===
After Taimainu-pō's son was born, however, he wished for the baby to receive the tohi baptismal ritual from his grandfather, so he revealed his true parentage and the fact the Kōkako was still alive to Tū-kōtuku and Māhanga, who agreed to let them go to Kōkako, in the hope that Taimainu-pō would forge a peace between him and Kōkako. Then he placed Tamainu-pō, Tū-kōtuku, and the newborn under a tapu, telling them not to get out of their canoe or reply to calls from the banks of the river until they reached their destination. They paddled down the Waipā River and along the Waikato River until they reached Kōkako's new base on the island of Tai-pōuri near Rangiriri on the Waikato River (or Okarahea according to Mohi Te Rongomau). When they arrived, Kōkako agreed to perform the tohi ritual for both Tamainu-pō and his newborn son, whom he named Wairere, and he agreed to return to Kāniwhaniwha with Tamainu-pō and make peace with Māhanga.

=== Marriage to Te Aka-tāwhia ===
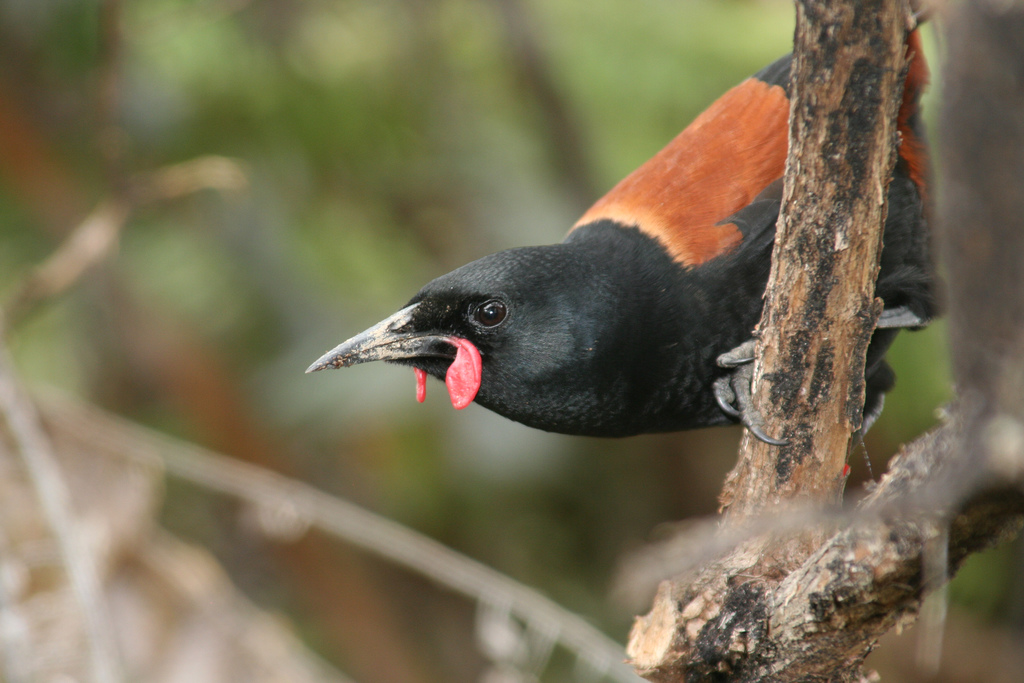
A saddleback.

Subsequently, Māhanga was summoned to Moehau in the Hauraki Gulf by Rongomai of Ngāti Rongoū, who may have been based at Pākihi Island at this time, to help avenge a murder committed by Ngāti Huarere. When they had defeated Ngāti Huarere, Rongomai proposed to marry his daughter, Te Aka-tāwhia to Māhanga, but she refused. So, Māhanga hid behind her latrine (which was called Rongorongo) and when she had finished defecating, he stuck his taiaha spear between her legs and said, "the plumes of my taiaha will wipe Te Aka-tāwhia's bottom." The shame was so great that Te Aka-tāwhia felt obliged to accept Māhanga's marriage proposal, but the furious waiata which she sang before the wedding, in which she calls Māhanga a "dung-eating saddleback," is preserved and was used by Ngāti Māhunga as a pre-battle waiata.

=== War of Te Whate-o-hua-raratahi ===
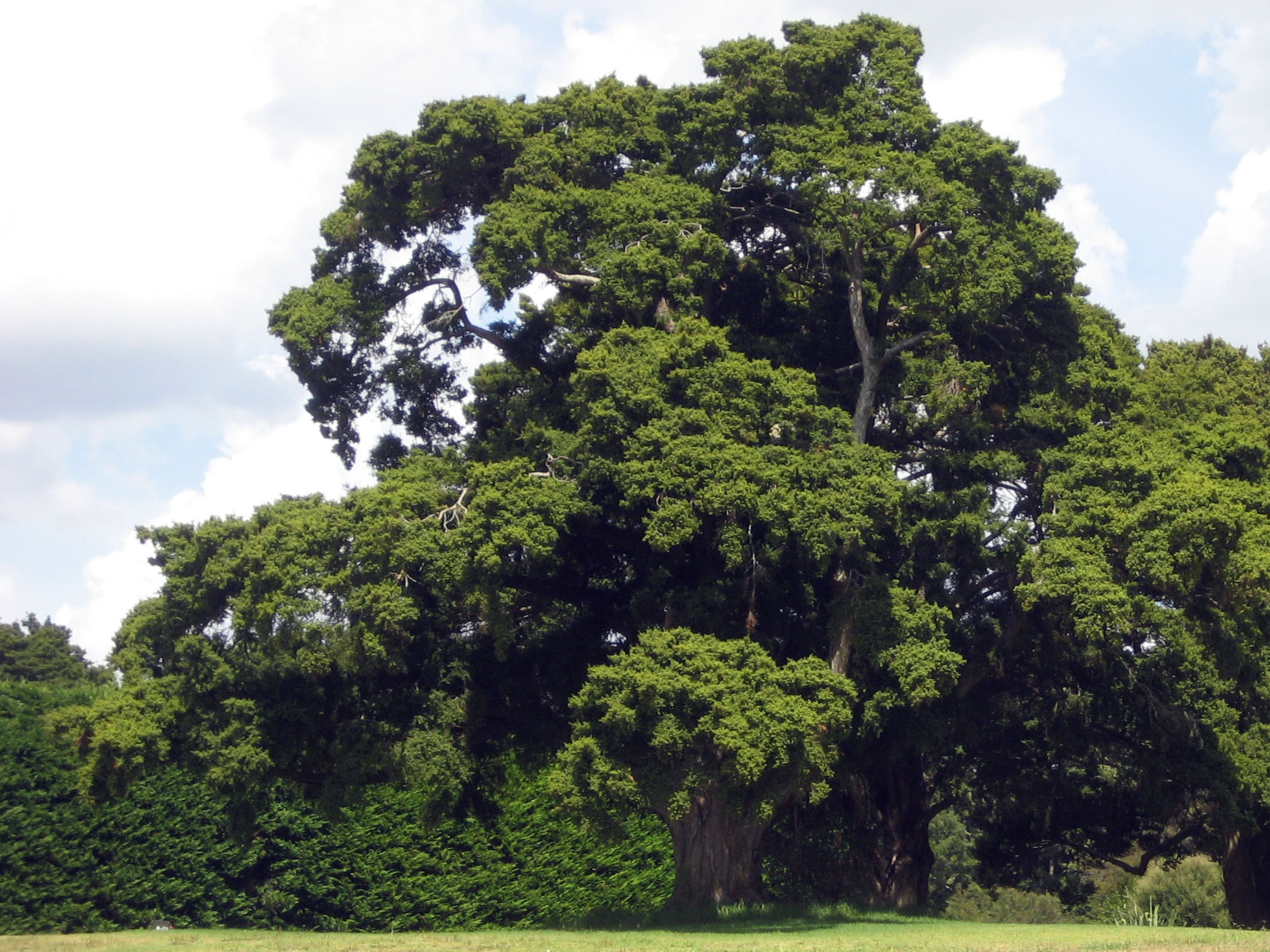
Tōtara tree

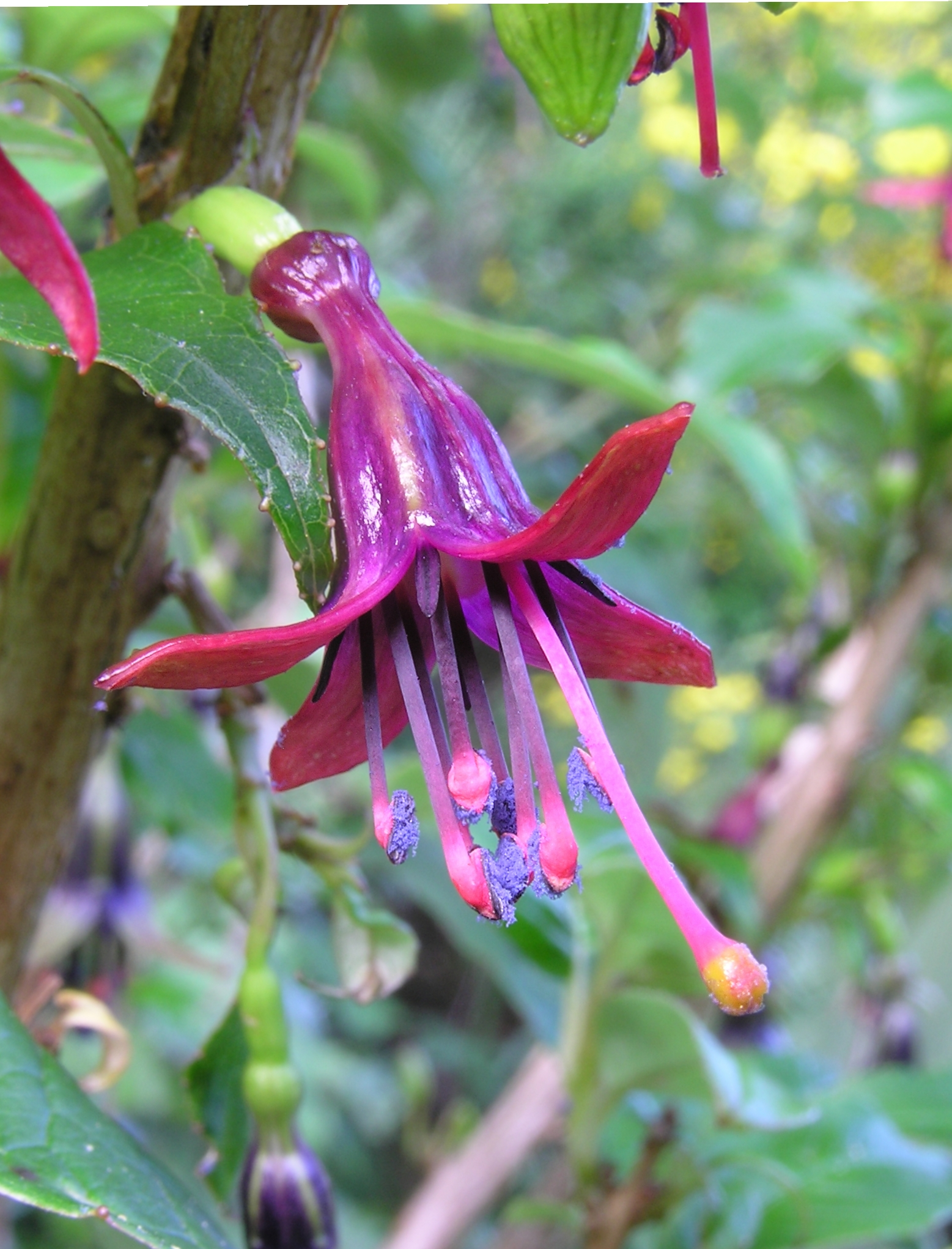
Kōtukutuku flower

In Māhanga's old age, his eldest son Tonga-nui came into conflict with the people around Kāwhia Harbour. There was a tōtara tree called Te Whare-o-hua-raratahi on the Pā-kōkō stream near Te Wharauroa which Te Pūhara, son of Tū-irirangi and his uncle Pai-ariki wished to cut down. At first Tonga-nui prevented this, but later they succeeded in chopping it down, so Tonga-nui pursued them, capturing and killing Te Pūhara at Te Kawaroa. Pai-ariki escaped to the Aotea Harbour, where Tū-paenga-roa, another son of Tū-irirangi, took him in. Tonga-nui took three fortresses, Mōwhiti, Puketoa, and Herangi. However, when he was besieging the final fortress, Manu-aitu, a storm came up and as the besiegers were gathering reeds in order to build some shelters they were attacked and killed by Tū-paenga-roa's forces. Tonga-nui was killed and so were his cousins, Māhanga's nephews, Ngarue-i-te-hotu, Tai-akiaki, and Raho-paru. Only Māhanga's youngest nephew, Terewai, survived. Tū-paenga-roa put him to work as a slave, sending him out to collect water from a spring outside the fortress, with a rope tied around his middle so that he would not escape. However, Terewai tied the rope to a kōtukutuku tree, so that when the men in the fort pulled on the rope, they thought Terewai was still on the end of it. Thus, he managed to get away to the Waipa region and tell them about the massacre.

Then Māhanga came down from Moehau to Kāwhaniwha and gave a speech, encouraging the young men to get revenge for his son and nephews. At the end of the speech, he placed his famous taiaha spear, Tikitiki-o-rangi ('Highest Heaven') in front of two prominent rangatira, Whare-tīpeti and Tapaue, but a young warrior of Ngāti Māhanga, Manu-pīkare leapt up and took it instead. It was passed down by his descendants until the death of Te Au-pōuri, who left it to Māori King Te Rata (r. 1912-1933) and Pei Te Hurinui Jones reports that it remained in the possession of King Korokī as of the mid-twentieth century.

=== Death ===
After his speech, Māhanga set out by canoe to return to Moehau. At Tūtū-kākā (modern Thames), they were forced to land in the middle of the night by a storm. Māhanga sent a slave with a mussel shell to steal some fire from a nearby village belonging to Ngāti Huarere, but he was captured and revealed that Māhanga was nearby. At dawn they captured and killed him. When they had grown up, hiis sons, Te Ao-tū-tahanga and Manu-kaihonge, gathered a war-party from Moehau and Mount Pirongia and attacked the Ngāti Huarere at Tūtū-kākā in revenge.

== Family ==
Māhanga had several sons and two daughters by Paratai:

- Te kie-raunui
- Tu-pana-mai-waho
- Tonga-nui
- Wai-tawake, who married in Maniapoto.
- Tū-kōtuku-rerenga-tahi, who married Tamainu-pō.
- Rua-teatea

By Hinetepei:

- Pōtaua

By Wharewaiata

- Atutahi

By Te Aka-tāwhia, he had three sons:

- Te Ao-tū-tahanga
- Manu-kaihonge
- Pare-moehau

One account appears to make him the father of Reitū and Reipae, but various other parentages are recorded by the oral tradition.

== Sources ==
The Tainui account of Māhanga, embedded in the stories of Kōkako and Tamainu-pō, is recorded by Pei Te Hurinui Jones based on an oral account which he heard from Te Nguha Huirama of Ngāti Tamainu-pō, Ngāti Maniapoto, and Ngāti Te Ata on 24 May 1932. A similar story, attributed to Ngāti Awa sources, but actually derived from an 1871 manuscript by Wiremu Te Wheoro, appears in John White The Ancient History of the Maori: IV Tainui (1888).

The Tainui account of Māhanga's life after the peace with Kōkako is also recorded by Pei Te Hurinui Jones, but derives from different sources: Aihe Huirama and Te Nguha Huirama, who told it to him in 1932, and Waata Roore Erueti of Ngāti Māhanga, who told it to him in June 1942. The details of the War of Te Whare-o-hua-raratahi are reported by Bruce Biggs based on accounts of Mohi Te Rongomau and Wiremu Te Wheoro contained in an 1886 manuscript.

A very different account was told to George Graham on 6 December 1902, by Ānaru Makiwhara, according to which Māhanga was a son of Tāne-atua, older brother of Toroa, the captain of the Mātaatua canoe (i.e. around 1300), who abandoned his family in the Bay of Plenty, moved to Kāwhia and married Paratai, by whom he had a daughter, Muri-rāwhiti, the first wife of Hotunui. Elsdon Best also has this version, recording the original base in Bay of Plenty as Pū-tuaki.

== Bibliography ==
- Jones, Pei Te Hurinui; Biggs, Bruce (2004). Ngā iwi o Tainui : nga koorero tuku iho a nga tuupuna = The traditional history of the Tainui people. Auckland [N.Z.]: Auckland University Press. ISBN 1869403312.
- White, John (1888). The Ancient History of the Maori: IV Tainui.
