= Ngāti Tamaterā =

Māori iwi (tribe) in Aotearoa (New Zealand)

- Iwi (tribe) in Māoridom
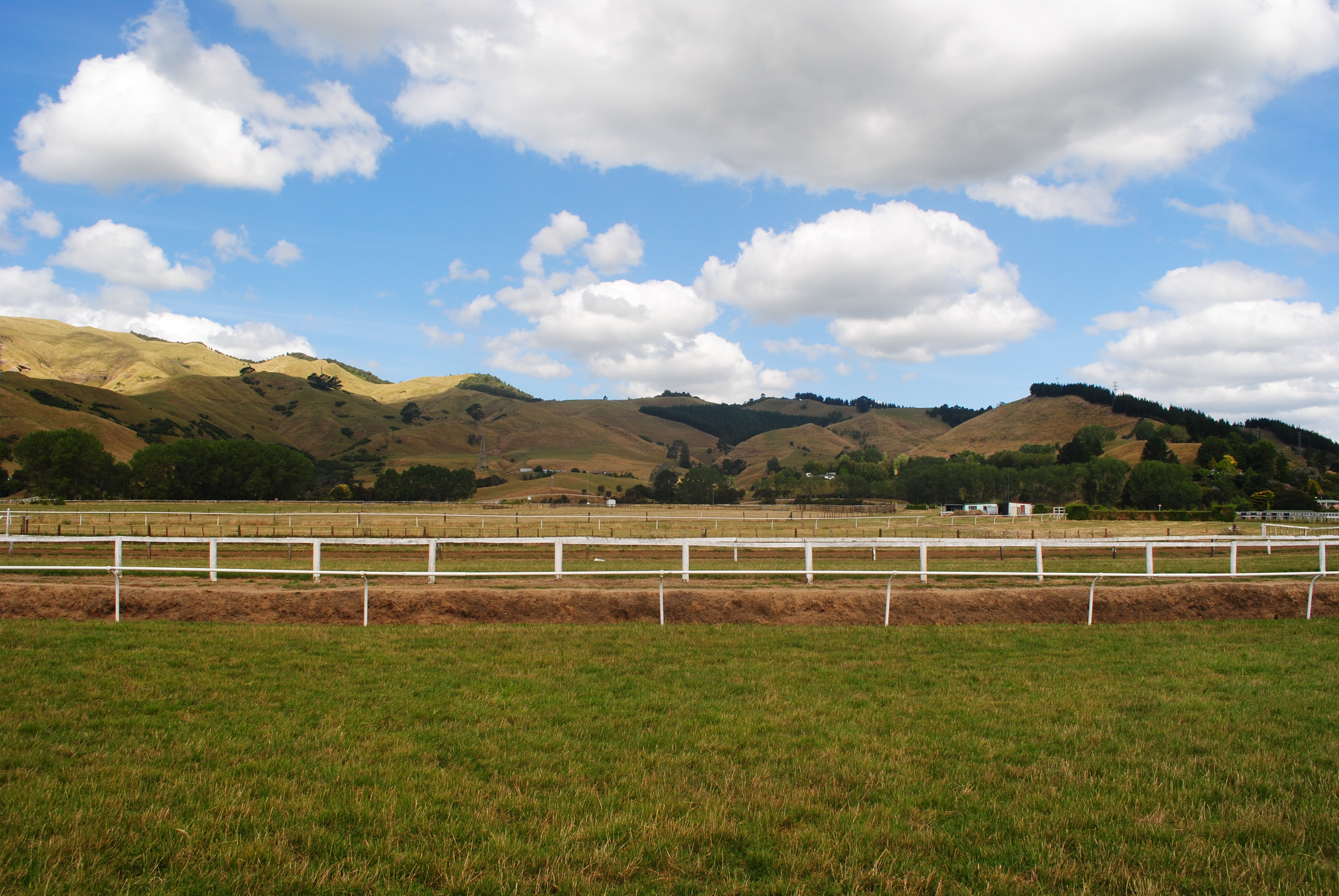
- The Paeroa area
- Rohe (region): Hauraki
- Waka (canoe): Tainui
- Website: www.tamatera.iwi.nz

Ngāti Tamaterā is a Māori iwi (tribe) of the Hauraki region of New Zealand, descended from Tamaterā, the second son of Marutūāhu. It is a major tribe within the Marutūāhu confederation and its leaders have been prominent in Hauraki history and Marutūāhu tribal affairs. It is one of five tribes of the Marutūāhu confederation, the others being Ngāti Maru, Ngāti Paoa, Ngāti Rongoū and Ngāti Whanaunga. The Marutūāhu tribes are all descended from Marutūāhu, a son of Hotunui, who is said to have arrived in New Zealand on the Tainui canoe. The Marutūāhu tribes are therefore part of the Tainui group of tribes. The Marutūāhu confederation is also part of the Hauraki collective of tribes.

Te Raupa pā, on the banks of the Ohinemuri River near Paeroa, was a location where Ngāti Tamaterā traditionally settled.

== See also ==
- List of Māori iwi
