= Te Pahu =

Settlement in Waikato, New Zealand

- Village
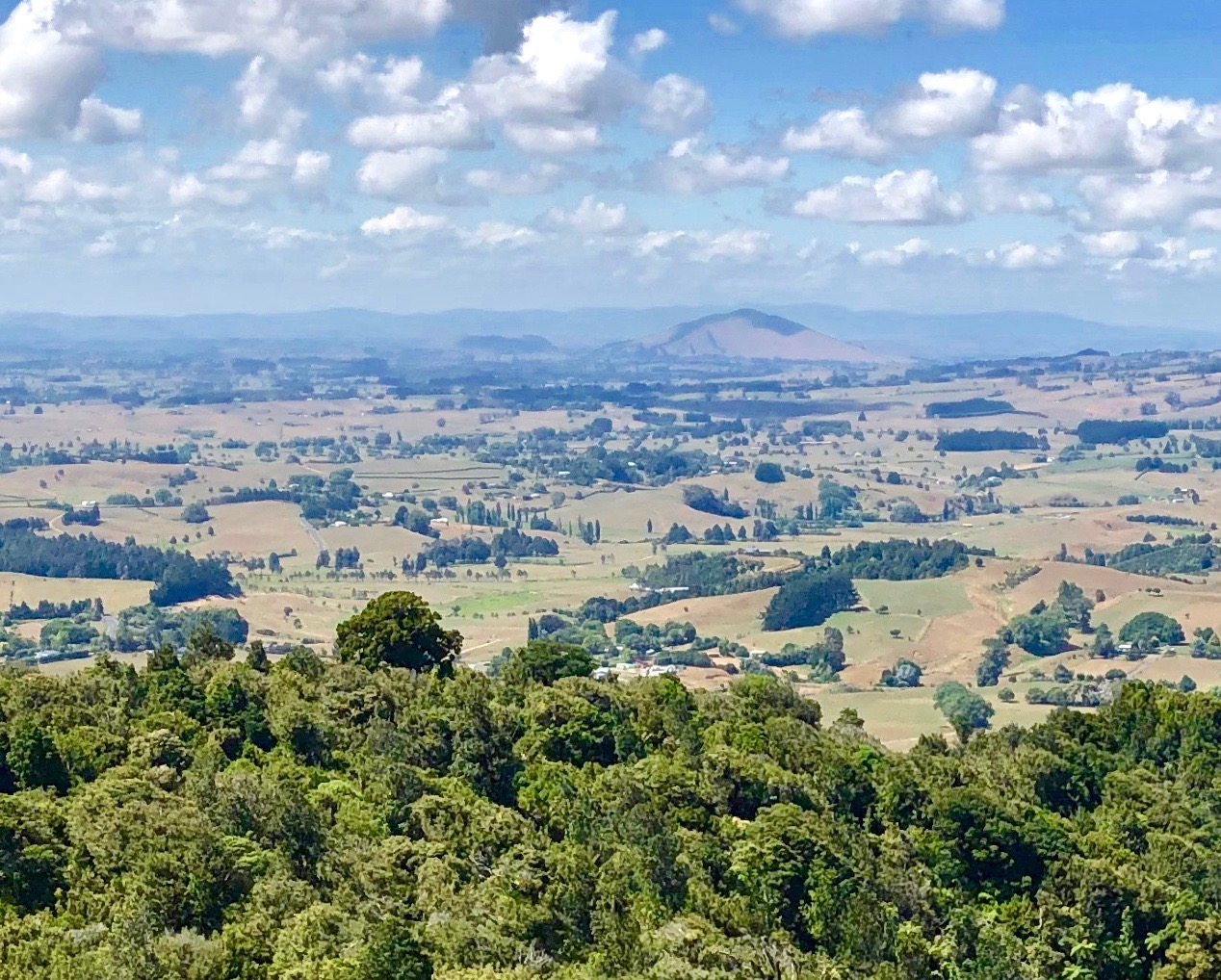
- Te Pahu and Kakepuku from Karamu Walkway
- Interactive map of Te Pahu
- Coordinates: 37.919°S 175.135°E
- Country: New Zealand
- Region: Waikato
- District: Waipā District
- Ward: Pirongia-Kakepuku General Ward
- Electorates: Taranaki-King Country; Hauraki-Waikato (Māori)

Government
  - Territorial Authority: Waipā District Council
  - Regional council: Waikato Regional Council
  - Mayor of Waipa: Mike Pettit
  - Taranaki-King Country MP: Barbara Kuriger
  - Hauraki-Waikato MP: Hana-Rawhiti Maipi-Clarke

Area
  - Territorial: 33.59 km^{2} (12.97 sq mi)
- Elevation: 50 m (160 ft)

Population (2023 Census)
  - Territorial: 483
  - Density: 14.4/km^{2} (37.2/sq mi)
- Time zone: UTC+12 (NZST)
  - Summer (DST): UTC+13 (NZDT)

Te Pahu is a rural community in the Waipā District and Waikato region of New Zealand's North Island, located just north of Cambridge across State Highway 1.

It is located north of Pirongia and south of Ngāhinapōuri just off State Highway 39.

Karamu Walkway runs along the Kapamahunga Range to the north of the village. It is part of Te Araroa long-distance walkway.

== History ==
=== Early history ===
The first recorded settlers of the area are descendants of the Tainui waka, led by Māhanga, who established Purakau Pā at the junction of the Kaniwhaniwha stream and the Waipā River and settled the lower valley in the late sixteenth century. Māhanga's son Tonganui suffered a major defeat to Kawhia Māori. The tribe suffered a major defeat to Europeans during the Invasion of the Waikato; their land was confiscated and they were forced to relocate to the north.

In 1879 peace negotiations Prime Minister Grey said Harapepe was excluded from the proposal to return Waikato lands to King Tāwhiao, even though former Minister of Native Affairs, Donald McLean, had included it in his offer of terms. A Waitangi Tribunal report says, "This was, it seems, the first official public admission that not all Crown lands were to be made available to return to the Kīngitanga. In particular, the Grey Government planned to exclude the blocks that McLean had repurchased specifically to include them in the package of lands ringfenced for return, which were mostly in the Harapepe district around Pirongia. But Grey did say that some Harapepe lands would be set aside as an endowment for a school at which Kīngitanga children could be educated."

=== European settlement ===
The first European settler in the area was John Vittoria Cowell, a Kawhia trader, who was given about 40,000 acres (16,000 ha) by Ngāti Apakura in October 1839. He was the son of John Cowell, a lay missionary, who came to work with Samuel Marsden. After the 1864 invasion, John Cowell lost all his lands under the Confiscation Act and died in poverty. His Homewood house, on Rosborough Road, to the south of Te Pahu, may date from 1841 and be the oldest surviving building in Waikato.

During the war the area was settled by British militia, who were banned from leaving the area but often too poor to buy crops to continue living there. Many lots were abandoned; settlers who continued living there constantly feared attack from local Māori and often sought shelter in a blockhouse. A local industry of flax milling, and mixed cow and pig farming.

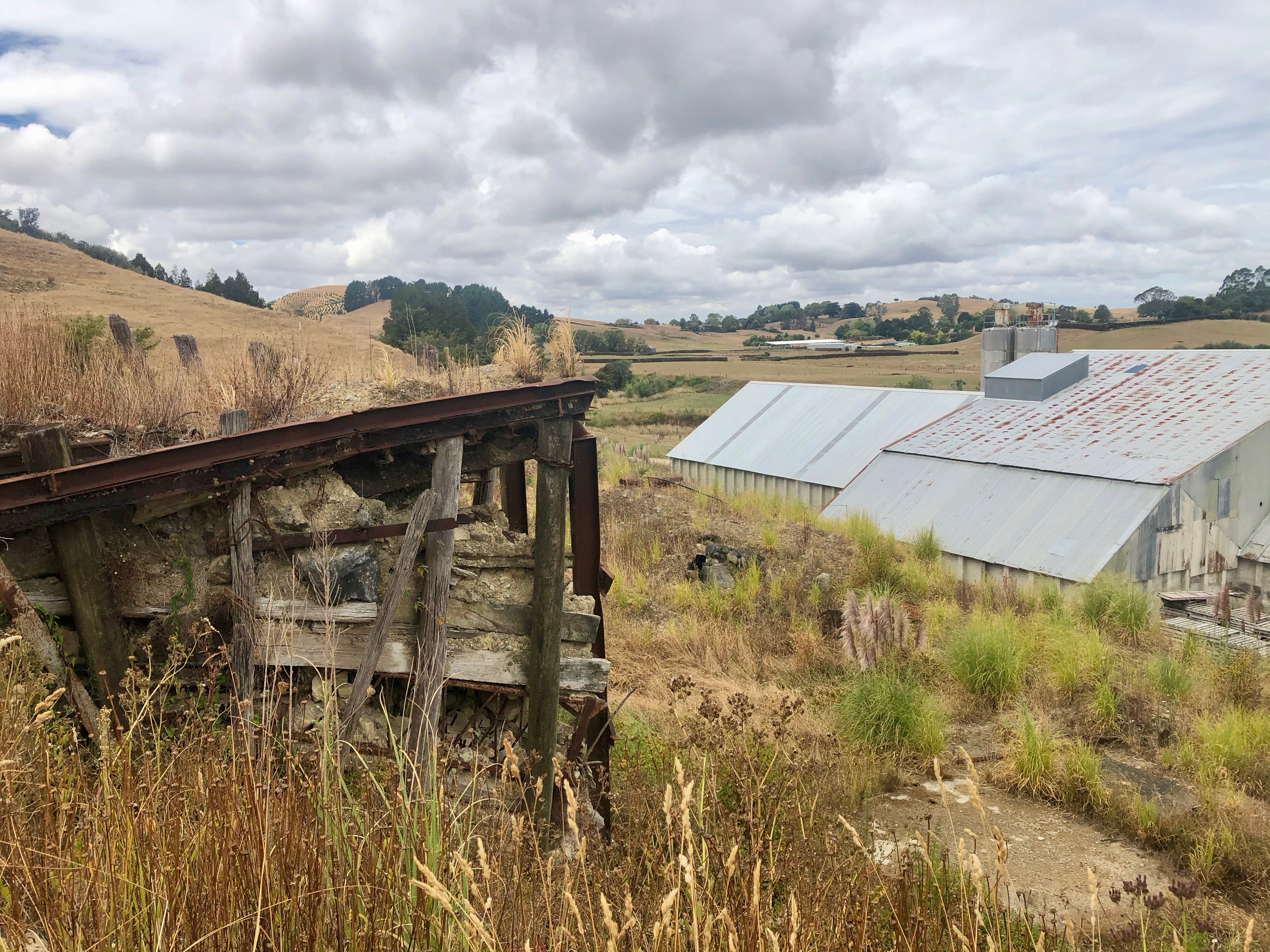
The limeworks opened in 1917. The staithe in the foreground looks like it might have been part of the original quarry.

Te Pahu remained extremely isolated for many years, with settlers relying on supplies delivered by the Waipā River. A pub and general store were established in the 1860s, followed by a post office in 1866 and a school house in 1877. The school house was used for monthly Presbyterian church services; it closed briefly and reopened before burning down in 1891; another school opened nearby in 1889 and took in the remaining students.

A bridge was built over the river in 1881, reducing the community's isolation.

The area was struck by major flooding in 1907 and February 1958, leaving the community again cut off from Te Awamutu and Hamilton.

A limeworks was built on Limeworks Loop Rd in 1917.

==== Harapepe ====
The name Harapepe remains on the modern map, 1.2 km (0.75 mi) south of Te Pahu Road corner, though it has lost all but a few houses. It was originally the main military settlement in the area, with –

- a blockhouse (in a 1943 aerial photo it was c. 20 m (66 ft) square on a long ridge, but is now only a slight mound),
- a redoubt (built in February 1865 by the Forest Rangers, but no longer visible),
- a store,
- Settlers Arms Hotel,
- Harapepe School (1877–91),
- a Post Office (1867–1930)

The importance of Harapepe seems to have declined after Harapepe dairy was built at Te Pahu in 1897 and was joined in 1909 by neighbouring Te Pahu Post Office. A daily mail service to both post offices started in 1913 and was taking passengers in 1914. Te Pahu Hall also opened nearby in 1911. The hall was renovated and extended between 1979 and 1981.

As late as 1935 the name Harapepe was still being used to describe a proposed extension of electric power supplies.

=== Modern history ===
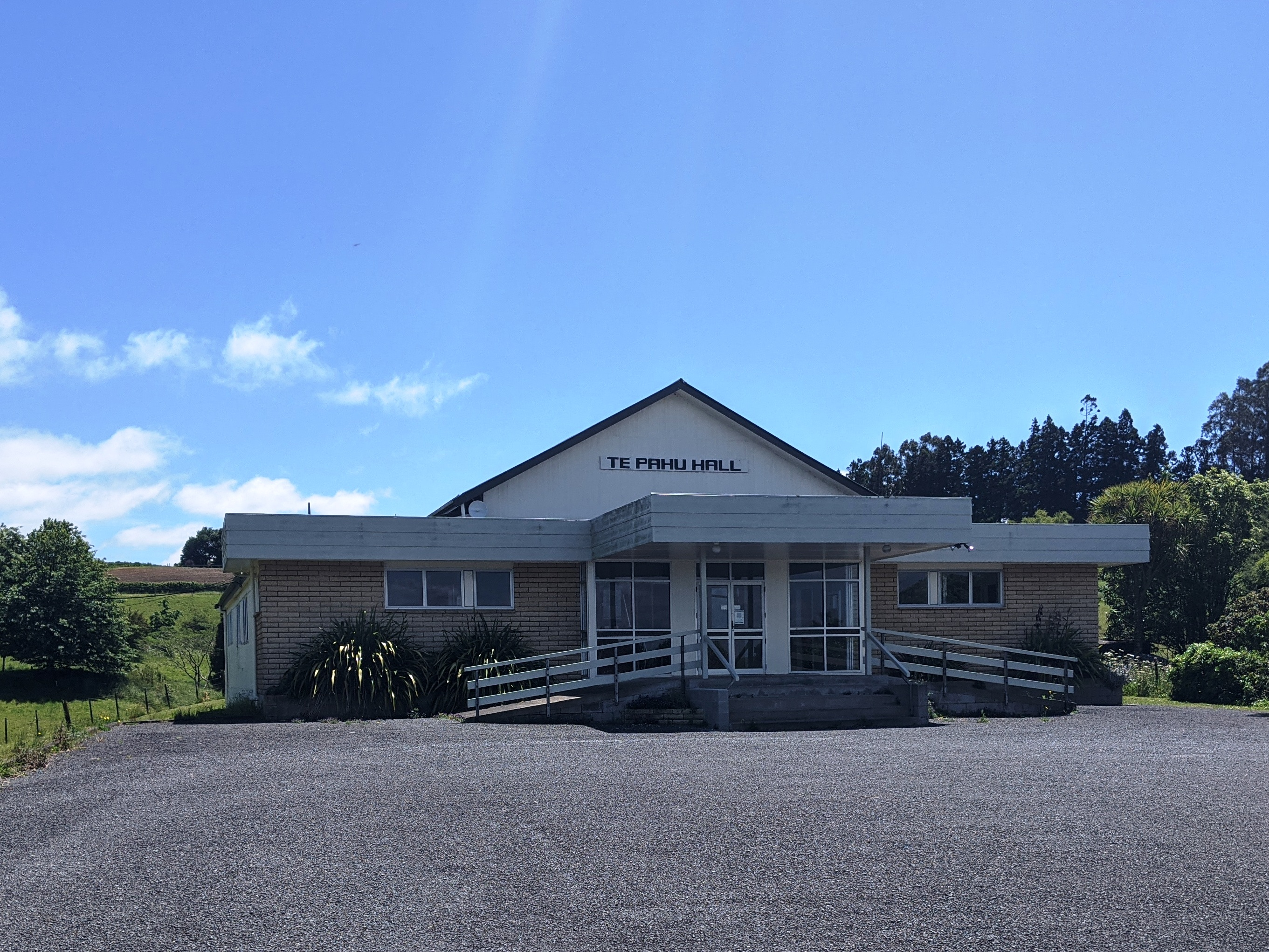
Te Pahu Community Hall

In the 1920s and 1930s Robertson, then Hodgson's, Motors ran a daily bus from Pirongia to Hamilton via Te Pahu.

A new garage and general store was established in 1952. A limeworks opened in 1972. The Post Office was among many closed by Richard Prebble on 5 February 1988.

In 2019, Waikato Regional Council reported a surge of complaints about farm effluent discharges from farms at several Waikato locations including Te Pahu.

== Demographics ==
Te Pahu settlement is in three SA1 statistical areas which also include Harapepe and cover 33.59 km^{2} (12.97 sq mi). The SA1 areas are part of the larger Te Pahu statistical area.

Historical population of Te Pahu and surrounds
| Year | Pop. | ±% p.a. |
|---|---|---|
| 2006 | 387 | — |
| 2013 | 399 | +0.44% |
| 2018 | 468 | +3.24% |
| 2023 | 483 | +0.63% |

Te Pahu and surrounds had a population of 483 in the 2023 New Zealand census, an increase of 15 people (3.2%) since the 2018 census, and an increase of 84 people (21.1%) since the 2013 census. There were 234 males, 240 females and 3 people of other genders in 171 dwellings. 2.5% of people identified as LGBTIQ+. There were 105 people (21.7%) aged under 15 years, 66 (13.7%) aged 15 to 29, 231 (47.8%) aged 30 to 64, and 81 (16.8%) aged 65 or older.

People could identify as more than one ethnicity. The results were 90.7% European (Pākehā), 10.6% Māori, 3.1% Pasifika, 3.7% Asian, and 3.7% other, which includes people giving their ethnicity as "New Zealander". English was spoken by 98.8%, Māori language by 2.5%, and other languages by 8.1%. No language could be spoken by 1.2% (e.g. too young to talk). The percentage of people born overseas was 16.1, compared with 28.8% nationally.

Religious affiliations were 23.6% Christian, 1.2% Hindu, 0.6% New Age, and 1.2% other religions. People who answered that they had no religion were 60.9%, and 11.8% of people did not answer the census question.

Of those at least 15 years old, 102 (27.0%) people had a bachelor's or higher degree, 231 (61.1%) had a post-high school certificate or diploma, and 60 (15.9%) people exclusively held high school qualifications. 48 people (12.7%) earned over $100,000 compared to 12.1% nationally. The employment status of those at least 15 was that 222 (58.7%) people were employed full-time, 60 (15.9%) were part-time, and 3 (0.8%) were unemployed.

=== Te Pahu statistical area ===
Te Pahu statistical area covers 158.17 km^{2} (61.07 sq mi) and had an estimated population of 1,540 as of June 2025, with a population density of 9.7 people per km^{2}.

Historical population for the statistical area
| Year | Pop. | ±% p.a. |
|---|---|---|
| 2006 | 1,194 | — |
| 2013 | 1,269 | +0.87% |
| 2018 | 1,428 | +2.39% |
| 2023 | 1,461 | +0.46% |

Te Pahu had a population of 1,461 in the 2023 New Zealand census, an increase of 33 people (2.3%) since the 2018 census, and an increase of 192 people (15.1%) since the 2013 census. There were 744 males, 714 females and 3 people of other genders in 534 dwellings. 2.5% of people identified as LGBTIQ+. The median age was 42.0 years (compared with 38.1 years nationally). There were 294 people (20.1%) aged under 15 years, 198 (13.6%) aged 15 to 29, 744 (50.9%) aged 30 to 64, and 222 (15.2%) aged 65 or older.

People could identify as more than one ethnicity. The results were 92.2% European (Pākehā); 12.9% Māori; 1.6% Pasifika; 2.9% Asian; 0.6% Middle Eastern, Latin American and African New Zealanders (MELAA); and 3.5% other, which includes people giving their ethnicity as "New Zealander". English was spoken by 97.9%, Māori language by 3.1%, and other languages by 6.6%. No language could be spoken by 1.8% (e.g. too young to talk). New Zealand Sign Language was known by 0.2%. 16.2% of people were born overseas, compared with 28.8% nationally.

Religious affiliations were 28.5% Christian, 0.4% Hindu, 0.2% New Age, and 1.4% other religions. People who answered that they had no religion were 59.3%, and 10.1% of people did not answer the census question.

Of those at least 15 years old, 300 (25.7%) people had a bachelor's or higher degree, 666 (57.1%) had a post-high school certificate or diploma, and 201 (17.2%) people exclusively held high school qualifications. The median income was $50,900, compared with $41,500 nationally. 165 people (14.1%) earned over $100,000 compared to 12.1% nationally. The employment status of those at least 15 was that 675 (57.8%) people were employed full-time, 189 (16.2%) were part-time, and 18 (1.5%) were unemployed.

| Year | Population | Average age | Households | Median income | National median income |
|---|---|---|---|---|---|
| 2001 | 1110 | 33.9 | 363 | $28,000 | $18,500 |
| 2006 | 1194 | 36.2 | 411 | $29,000 | $24,100 |
| 2013 | 1269 | 41.3 | 462 | $36,500 | $27,900 |
| 2018 | 1428 | 39.1 | 507 | $40,300 | $31,800 |
| 2023 | 1461 | 42.0 | 534 | $50,900 | $41,500 |

== Education ==
Te Pahu School is a co-educational state primary school for Year 1 to 8 students, with a roll of 97 as of July 2026. The school opened in 1911.

== Notable people ==
- Helen Clark, former Prime Minister of New Zealand, administrator of the UN Development Programme

== See also ==
- Toothbrush fence on Limeworks Loop Road
