= Ngāti Maru (Hauraki) =

Māori iwi (tribe) in Aotearoa New Zealand

- Iwi (tribe) in Māoridom
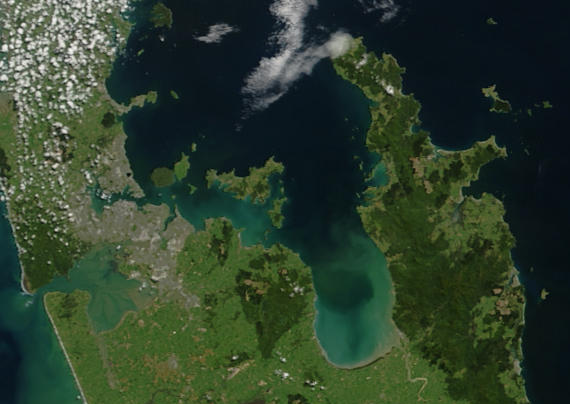
- Hauraki Gulf

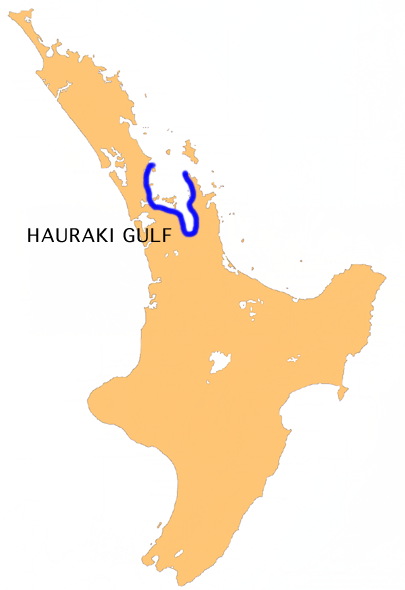
- Rohe (region): Hauraki
- Waka (canoe): Tainui
- Website: ngatimaru.iwi.nz

Ngāti Maru is a Māori iwi (tribe) of the Hauraki region of New Zealand. The stronghold of Ngāti Maru has been the Thames area. Ngāti Maru are descendants of Te Ngako, also known as Te Ngakohua, the son of Marutūāhu, after whom the tribe is named.

It is one of five tribes of the Marutūāhu confederation, the others being Ngāti Paoa, Ngāti Rongoū, Ngāti Tamaterā and Ngāti Whanaunga. The Marutūāhu tribes are descended from Marutūāhu, a son of Hotunui, who is said to have arrived in New Zealand on the Tainui canoe. The Marutūāhu tribes are therefore part of the Tainui group of tribes. The Marutūāhu confederation is also part of the Hauraki collective of tribes.

The tribal seat of Ngāti Maru is said to have been Kirikiri, just south-east of Thames.

== History ==
Te Ngako was younger than his half-brothers Tamatepō (whose descendants are Ngāti Rongoū), Tamaterā (whose descendants are Ngāti Tamaterā) and Whanaunga (whose descendants are Ngāti Whanaunga). Marutūāhu married two sisters, Hineurunga and Paremoehau. Hineurunga was the tuakana (eldest sister). This gave Te Ngako the mana of being tuakana to his older brothers. Hence the name given to the descendants of Te Ngako was not Ngāti Te Ngako but Ngāti Maru.

The Ngāti Maru of Taranaki are descended from Marutūāhu's brother Maruwharanui. The descendants of a third brother, Marukōpiri, settled on the Whanganui River.

From about 1822 to 1832 they fought battles against Ngati Tūwharetoa.

In 1821, Ngāti Maru suffered a major defeat at the hands of Ngāpuhi, at Te Tōtara Pā. The bloodshed of Te Tōtara was so great, that even after the Ngā Puhi were driven out, the site remained unoccupied. Now, it acts as a cemetery for both Māori and Pākehā, even though calls were made to recognise the pā as a Thames Heritage Site in 1937. Despite Te Tōtara Pā residing under the banner of Ngāti Maru, the pā housed many subjects across a broad spectrum of iwi throughout the island. As a stronghold, Te Tōtara had fended off several previous attacks led by Hongi Hika, and other Ngā Puhi rangatira. However, upon Hika's return to New Zealand after meeting with King George IV, equipped with thousands of newly acquired muskets, he dwelt not on his previous defeat in 1817, and after striking a false peace, he finally put Te Tōtara to the musket.

Te Tōtara was utu (repayment) for an earlier battle, the battle of Waiwhāriki, between Ngāti Maru, and the Ngā Puhi hapū of Ngāti Tautahi, fought in 1793 in the Bay of Islands. Hongi Hika was present at this battle.

During the 1850s Ngāti Maru were one of the main tribes providing large supplies of food to the new capital Auckland. Gold was discovered near Thames in 1852 which quickly changed from a small Māori kainga to a large European town of 40,000 people. Initially opinion was divided among the tribe whether they should allow Europeans access but they decided in favour when a government agent agreed to confine miners to one area, create a Māori police force to enforce this and pay Ngāti Maru for every licence sold by the government. When gold was found by the sons of a chief he sent them to Auckland to spread the news and create a rush. Tension was created because under New Zealand law land on which gold was found could be purchased by the state. In some cases land was leased directly from Māori by large mining firms. The early gold diggers found alluvial gold which they could obtain by simple tools but quickly this ran out and was replaced by firms installing stamper batteries crushing gold bearing quartz.

Ngāti Maru did not get involved in the 1863–64 land wars conflict.

In pre-gold rush period the Ngati Maru population was estimated at 310. After that, the population increased to 800 and by 1903 census the iwi had 1,350 members.

In 2013 , Ngāti Maru held a population of 3,765.

As of 2023 , Ngāti Maru boast a population of 6,528.

== Hapū ==
The iwi of Ngāti Maru consist of the following hapū:

- Te Ahumua
- Ngāti Te Aute - Descended from Te Aute, who connects to both Hotunui and Takakōpiri of Waitaha-a-Hei
- Ngāti Kuriuaua - Descended from Kuriuaua, a son of Rautao
- Ngāti Rautao - Descended from Rautao, a fantastic warrior and strategist
- Ngāti Hikairo
- Ngāti Wawenga
- Ngāti Whanga - Descended from Whanga, younger brother of Rautao and youngest son of Kahurautao
- Ngāti Hauāuru
- Ngāti Ua
- Ngāti Naunau - Descended from Naunau, father of the famous Tarawaikato
- Ngāti Hape
- Ngāti Tumoana
- Ngāti Matahau
- Ngāti Tahae - Descended from Tahae, a son of Kuriuaua

Ngāti Maru also consists of other hapū, that other iwi also claim. These are:

- Ngāti Pū - Also said to be a hapū of Ngāti Rongoū
- Te Uringahau - Also said to be a hapū of Ngāti Rongoū
- Ngāti Pakira - Also said to be a hapū of Tamatepō and Whanaunga descent
- Ngāti Kotinga - Also said to be a hapū of Ngāti Whanaunga

This is the full collection of hapū given by the Ngāti Maru registration form.

== Notable people ==
- Eloise Jillings
- Rautao

== See also ==
- List of Māori iwi
