= Ngāti Whanaunga =

Māori iwi (tribe) in Aotearoa New Zealand

- Iwi (tribe) in Māoridom
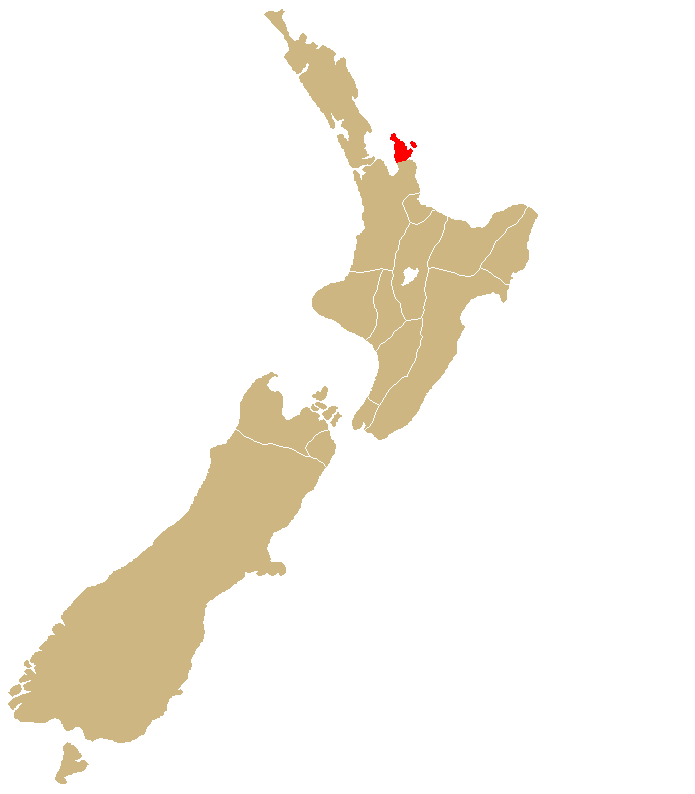
- Rohe (region): Hauraki
- Waka (canoe): Tainui

Ngāti Whanaunga is a Māori iwi (tribe) of the Coromandel Peninsula in New Zealand, descended from Whanaunga, the third son of Marutūāhu.

It is one of the tribes of the Marutūāhu confederation, the others being Ngāti Maru, Ngāti Rongoū and Ngāti Tamaterā. The Marutūāhu tribes are all descended from Marutūāhu, a son of Hotunui, who is said to have arrived in New Zealand on the Tainui canoe. The Marutūāhu tribes are therefore part of the Tainui group of tribes. The Marutūāhu confederation is also part of the Hauraki collective of tribes.

Nga Iwi FM serves Marutūahu from the iwi of Ngāti Whanaunga, Ngāti Tamaterā, Ngāti Rongoū, Ngāti Maru and other Hauraki residents from Te Patukirikiri, Ngāti Hako, Ngāti Huarere, Ngāti Hei, Ngāi Tai, Ngāti Pūkenga, and Ngāti Rāhiri. It was set up Paeroa on 9 March 1990 to cover local events and promote Māori language. It expanded its reach to the Coromandel Peninsula, Hauraki Gulf and Huntly in mid-1991. The station is available on 92.2 FM on Coromandel Peninsula, 99.5 FM in Paeroa, and 92.4 FM across the Hauraki Plains to Miranda and Huntly.

The hapū of Ngāti Whanaunga are as follows:

- Ngāti Karaua
- Ngāti Matau
- Ngāti Kotinga
- Ngāti Puku
- Te Mateawa
- Ngāti Rangiaohia
- Ngāti Rangiuira
- Ngāti Rāmuri
- Ngāti Ngaropapa
- Ngāti Hinerangi
- Ngāti Pakira
- Ngāti Wharo

== See also ==
- List of Māori iwi
