= Reitū and Reipae =

Precolonial Māori sisters

Reitū and Reipae (or Reipare) were twin sisters from the Tainui confederation of Māori tribes in Waikato, New Zealand, who lived before European settlement. Tainui tradition remembers them for the story of Reitū's courtship by Ue-oneone and for the important genealogical connection between Tainui and Ngā Puhi that was created by their marriages.

== Life ==
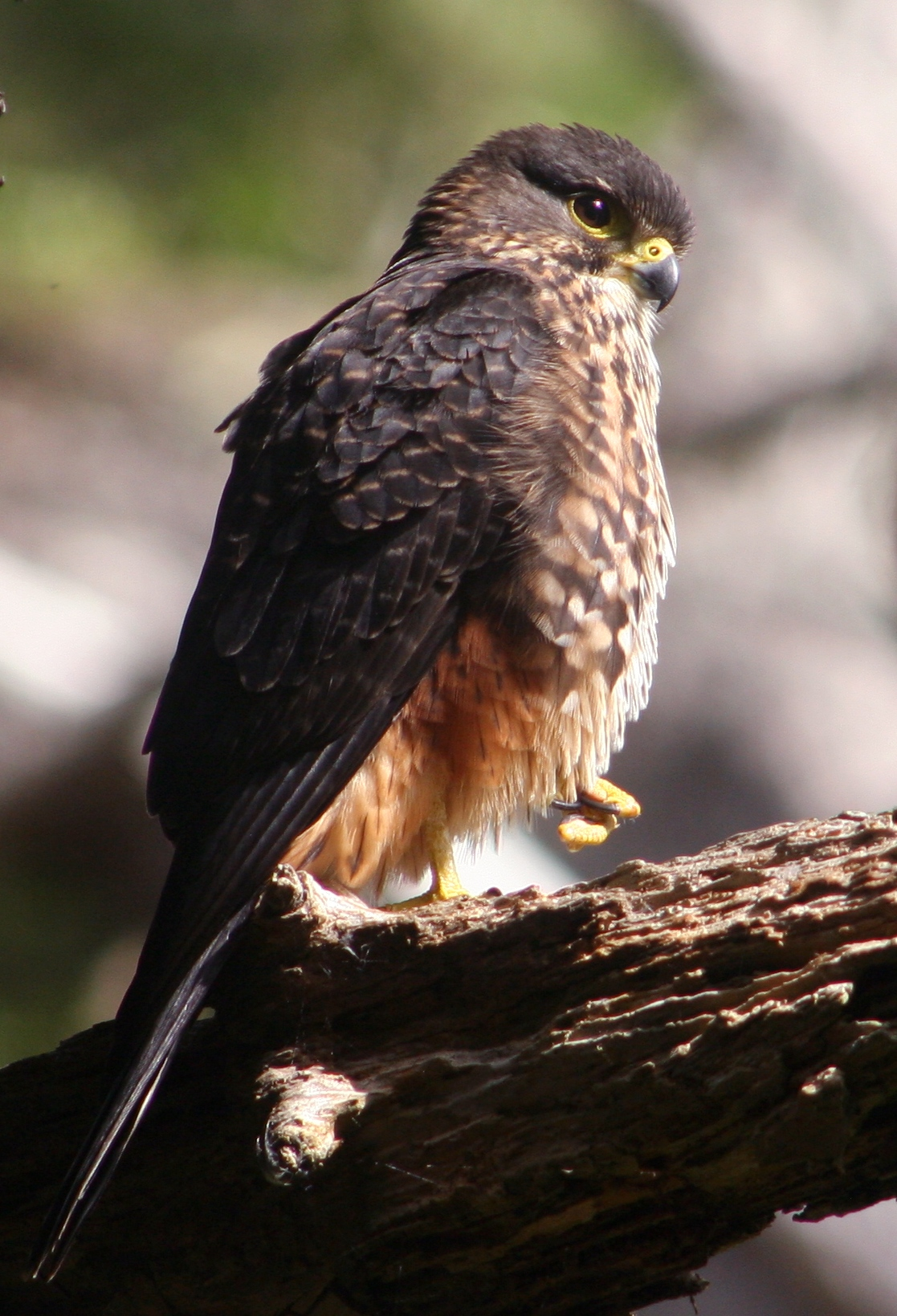
A kāiaia (New Zealand falcon).

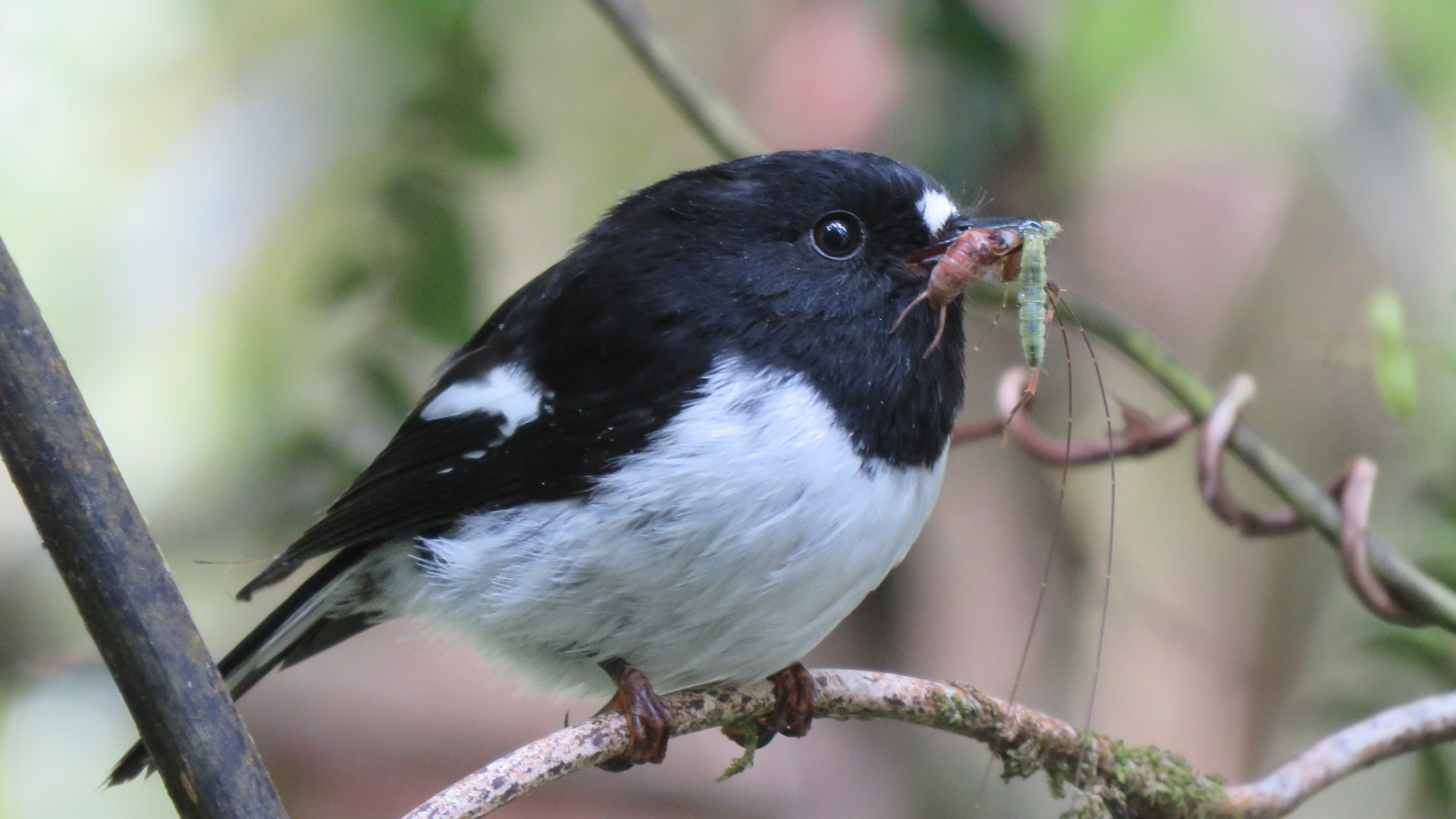
A miromiro (North Island tomtit).

The basic story is that Ue-oneone, a rangatira of Ngā Puhi descent, who was based at Pawarenga on the Whangape Harbour in Northland became enamoured by the beauty of Reitū – either after visiting her in Waikato or simply after hearing her described in rumours. Therefore, Ue-oneone performed a karakia ('incantation') which caused his pet kāiaia (falcon) to fly all the way to Waikato and land on the paepae of Reitū's house, which was called Tauranga-miromiro ('perch of the tomtit'). As Reitū and Reipae approached the bird it flew back slightly out of reach and they followed it, step by step all the way to Northland.

At Kaipara, Reipae met and married a man called Korowharo or Tāhuhu-pōtiki. A Muriwhenua account claims that Whangārei, which means 'Harbour of Rei' is named for her.

At Ngutu-pakapaka, Reitū and Ue-oneone met and married. The genealogical link created between Tainui and Ngā Puhi by these marriages is very important in Tainui whakapapa.

== Sources ==
The story is recorded by Pei Te Hurinui Jones, who heard it from Te Puea Hērangi and her husband Tūmōkai Kātipa, and also from Te Nguha Huirama on 11 November 1932. The pair appear in numerous, conflicting genealogies, including a pre-1898 manuscript of Hari Wahanui, a 1992 history of the Karapiro-Maungatautari area by Te Kapo Clark, an 1849 account by Āperāhama Taonui, and an un-dated account by Kārena Tāmaki. Pei Te Hurinui Jones himself gives two diverging genealogies.

== Family ==
According to the account that Jones got from Te Puea, Reitū and Reipae were the daughters of Wairere, who was the son of Tamainu-pō. Clark agrees and gives their mother's name as Māwera. Āperāhama Taonui instead makes them the daughters of Wairere's grandfather, Kōkako. According to Wahanui and Jones' other account they were daughters of Tūihu and descendants of Whatihua and Apakura. Jones' second account makes them the sisters of Te Ao-tū-tahanga, who is usually a son of Māhanga and places one "Maru-Māhanga" among their ancestors (Wahanui has their grandfather as "Raka-Māhanga"). Kārena Tāmaki has Te Ao-tū-tahanga as their father.

According to Jones, Reitū had two daughters by Ue-oneone, Kauae and Tawake-iti, who married Tūpoto and had a son, Korokoro, ancestor of Ngāti Korokoro. According to Āperāhama Taonui, Reitū's son was Taka-tōmua. According to the Muriwhenua account, all tribes north of Auckland are descended from Tūpoto.

Reipae had three children with her husband: Kaiawhi, Hou-taringa, and Rangi-oma. Kaiawhi married Kaharau, one of the main ancestors of Ngā Puhi.

== Bibliography ==
- Jones, Pei Te Hurinui; Biggs, Bruce (2004). Ngā iwi o Tainui : nga koorero tuku iho a nga tuupuna = The traditional history of the Tainui people. Auckland [N.Z.]: Auckland University Press. ISBN 1869403312.
- Taonui, Rāwiri (2005). "Story: Muriwhenua tribes: Ancestors". Te Ara: Encyclopedia of New Zealand.
