= Ngāti Rongoū =

Māori iwi (tribe) in Aotearoa (New Zealand)

- Iwi (tribe) in Māoridom
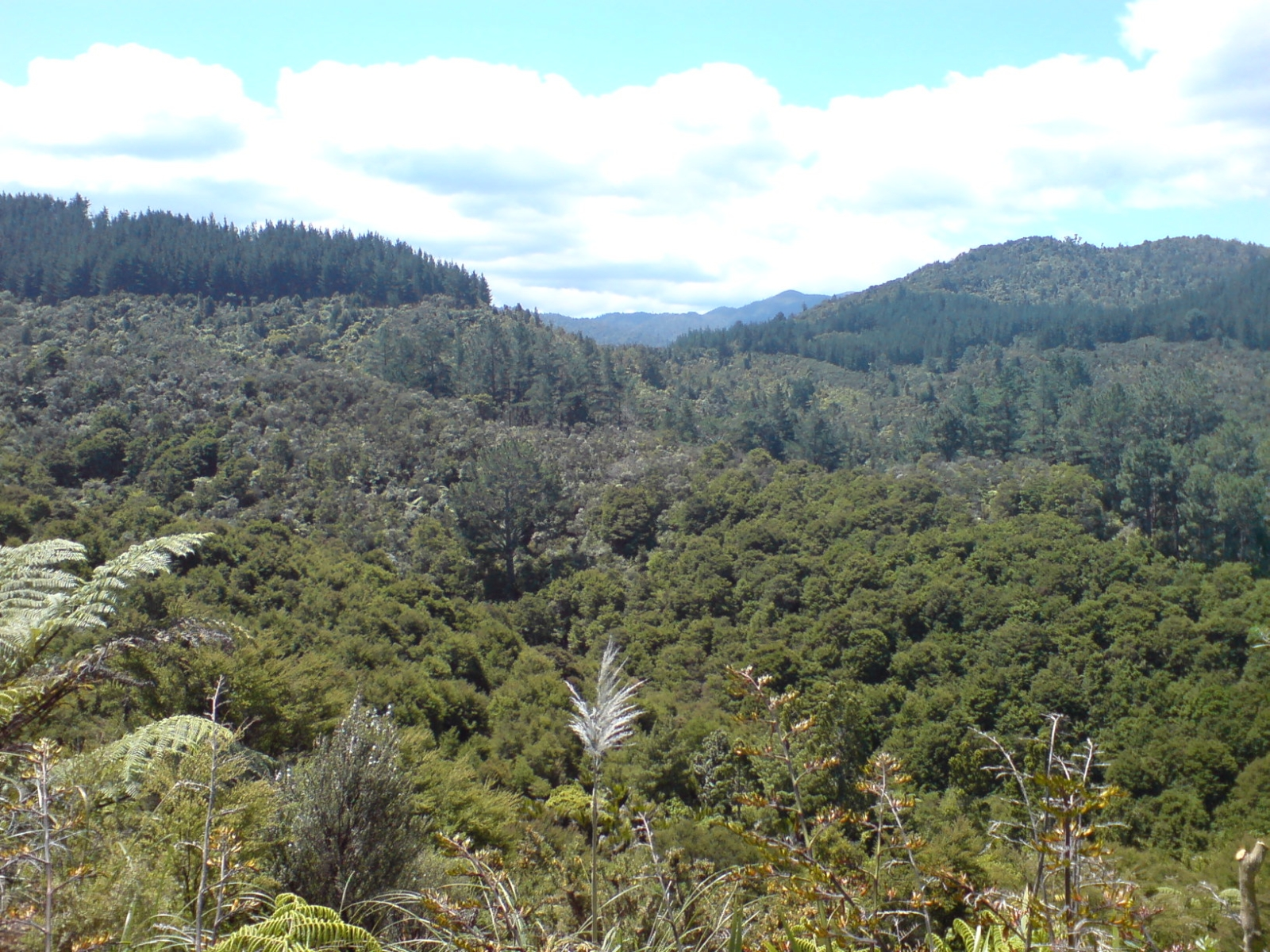
- Coromandel Peninsula

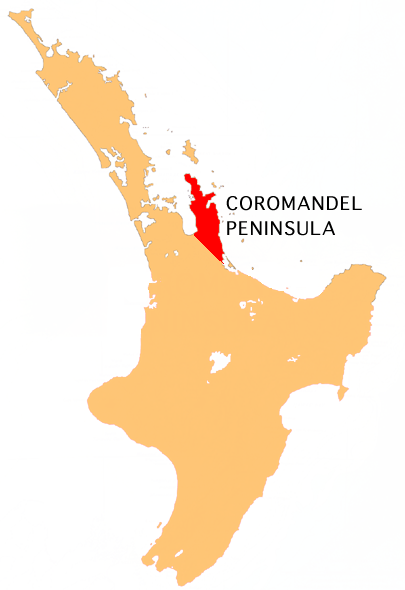
- Rohe (region): Hauraki
- Waka (canoe): Tainui

Ngāti Rongoū is a Māori iwi (tribe) of the Coromandel Peninsula in New Zealand.

It is one of five tribes of the Marutūāhu confederation, the others being Ngāti Maru, Ngāti Paoa, Ngāti Whanaunga and Ngāti Tamaterā. The Marutūāhu tribes are all descended from Marutūāhu, a son of Hotunui, who is said to have arrived in New Zealand on the Tainui canoe. The Marutūāhu tribes are therefore part of the Tainui group of tribes. The Marutūāhu confederation is also part of the Hauraki collective of tribes.

Nga Iwi FM serves Marutūahu from the iwi of Ngāti Rongoū, Ngāti Tamaterā, Ngāti Whanaunga, Ngāti Maru and Ngāti Pāoa, and other Hauraki residents from Te Patukirikiri, Ngāti Hako, Ngāti Huarere, Ngāti Hei, Ngāi Tai, Ngāti Pūkenga and Ngāti Rāhiri. It was set up Paeroa on 9 March 1990 to cover local events and promote Māori language. It expanded its reach to the Coromandel Peninsula, Hauraki Gulf and Huntly in mid-1991. The station is available on 92.2 FM on Coromandel Peninsula, 99.5 FM in Paeroa, and 92.4 FM across the Hauraki Plains to Miranda and Huntly.

== History ==
Ngāti Rongoū (also written as Rongo-Ū), descend from the eldest grandson of Tamatepō, Rongomai. Tamatepō had twin sons:

- Rauakiuta
  - Rongomai - Ancestor of Rongo-Ū
- Rauakitai
  - Mohoao - Ancestor of the hapū Ngāti Te Aute

According to Te Ahukaramū Royal, it was after the death of Marutūahu that Tamatepō's mana was diminished and his line faded into obscurity. Tamatepō's twin sons had a whakataukī in their name: "Te kanohi o to tokorua, e kore e kitea" - "The both of the one likeness, who were never seen".

Tamatepō married a Ngāti Huarere woman, whose name was Rangiuru or Rongomai, and is said to have been a slave. Hence Tamatepō's subsequent banishment back to Kāwhia, and the loss of mana and the mantle of Marutūahu's mauri. It wasn't until the time of Rongomai, that notice and mana came back to the line of Tamatepō. The name Rongo-Ū is a commemoration of this: "Ngāti Rongo-Ū" - "The descendants of Rongomai now established".

However, according to some of Tamatepō's descendants, Rangiuru was a highly-born woman of Ngāti Huarere.

Another notable descendant of Tamatepō was Kairangatira, son of Mohoao, who was chosen to lead the siege of Oruarangi Pā, after the wife of Tāurukapakapa (the youngest son of Marutūahu) was murdered by her own people. Kairangatira himself was later murdered by Ngāti Huarere near Kupata Stream. Tāurukapakapa was also murdered.

== Whakapapa ==
The rangatira of Ngāti Rongo-Ū, Te Aotūtahanga and Manukaihongi were grandsons of Rongomai.

- Tamatepō
  - Rauakiuta
    - Rongomai
      - Te Akatāwhia, married Māhanga
        - Te Aotūtahanga
        - Manukaihongi
  - Rauakitai
    - Mohoao
      - Kairangatira, married Paretao, daughter of Rautao
        - Pakira
          - Poutangi, married Te Aute, a descendant of Takakōpiri of Waitaha, and the second marriage of Hotunui

== See also ==
- List of Māori iwi
