= Marutūāhu =

Māori iwi (tribe) confederation in New Zealand

- Iwi (tribe) in Māoridom
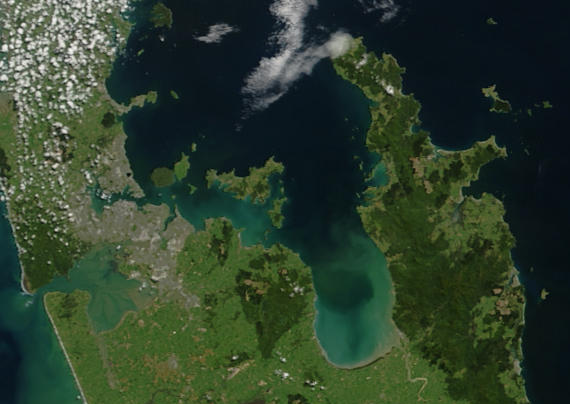
- Satellite photograph of the Hauraki Gulf and Coromandel Peninsula
- Rohe (region): Hauraki Gulf, Hauraki Plains, Coromandel Peninsula
- Waka (canoe): Tainui

Marutūāhu (also spelled Marutūahu or Marutuahu) is a confederation of Māori iwi (tribes) in the Hauraki region (the Hauraki Gulf, Coromandel Peninsula and Hauraki Plains) of New Zealand. The confederation comprises the tribes of Ngāti Maru, Ngāti Pāoa, Ngāti Tamaterā, Ngāti Whanaunga and Ngāti Rongoū.

The Marutūāhu tribes are descended from Marutūāhu, a son of Hotunui. Ngāti Maru tradition says that Hotunui arrived in New Zealand on the Tainui canoe around 1300, but Pei Te Hurinui Jones reports that he was the son of Uenuku-te-rangi-hōkā, son of Whatihua and thus a fifteen-generation descendant of the captain of Tainui canoe, Hoturoa. In this case, he would have lived at the end of the sixteenth century. Either way, the Marutūāhu tribes are therefore part of the Tainui group of tribes. They are also part of the Hauraki collective of tribes.

Marutūāhu married two sisters, Hineurunga and Paremoehau, and had five sons:

- Tamatepō, ancestor of Ngāti Rongoū
- Tamaterā, ancestor of Ngāti Tamaterā
- Whanaunga, ancestor of Ngāti Whanaunga
- Te Ngako, ancestor of Ngāti Maru
- Tāurukapakapa, ancestor of the Ngāti Te Aute hapū

Paremoehau was mother of the older three sons, while Hineurunga was the mother of Te Ngako and Tāurukapakapa. Although Te Ngako and Tāurukapakapa were younger than their half-brothers, Hineurunga was the tuakana (eldest sister), which gave Te Ngako the mana of being tuakana to his older brothers. Hence his descendants are called Ngāti Maru, not Ngāti Te Ngako. The Hauraki Ngāti Maru say that the Ngāti Maru of Taranaki are descended from Marutūāhu's brother Maruwharanui, but the Taranaki Ngāti Maru appear to give him a different parentage. The descendants of a third brother, Marukōpiri, settled on the Whanganui river.

== Family ==
By Paremoehau, Marutūāhu had three sons:

- Tamatepō, who married Rangiuru, and had twins:
  - Rauakitua, father of Rongomai, who was the ancestor of Ngāti Rongoū
  - Rauakitai, father of Mohoao.
- And had a third son, with Korena of Ngā Mārama:
  - Koroua, ancestor of Ngāti Pū
- Tamaterā, who first married Tūmorewhitia, then Ruawehea, a puhi of Ngāti Hako, and finally, Hineurunga, his step-mother. His children were:
- With Tūmorewhitia:
  - Pūtahi (also known as Pūtahi-nui-o-Rehua)
- With Ruawehea:
  - Pareterā
  - Taharua, ancestor of the Ngāti Taharua hapū of Paeroa
  - Taiuru
  - Maruiti
  - Taireina
  - Kunawhea
  - Honekai
- With Hineurunga:
  - Te Hīhī
  - Te Aokuranahe
- Whanaunga, who first married Heitawhiri and then Paretaru . His children were:
  - Karaua, ancestor of the Ngāti Karaua hapū
  - Iwituha (also known as Iwituahu), ancestor of a multitude of Ngāti Whanaunga hapū
  - Taoitekura, senior wife of Uenukukōpako

By Hineurunga, he had:

- Te Ngako, who married Pareterā, and had
  - Kahurautao, father of Rautao, who was a famous Ngāti Maru warrior and strategist
  - Naunau, father of Tarawaikato and Te Ngaiea, and ancestor of the Ngāti Naunau hapū
- Tāurukapakapa, who married Waenganui, a descendant of Takakōpiri, an ariki of Waitaha-nui-a-Hei, and had
  - Hikataheroa, who through his grandson Kuaka, became the ancestor of the Ngāti Te Aute hapū

== Sources ==
A Tainui account of Marutūāhu is recorded by Pei Te Hurinui Jones but, unusually, he does not report his source. It also appears in S. Percy Smith's History and Traditions of the Maoris of the west coast North Island of New Zealand prior to 1840, published in 1910. Hauraki Ngāti Maru versions are recorded by George Grey in 1853 and by John White in 1888.

== See also ==
- List of Māori iwi

== Bibliography ==
- Jones, Pei Te Hurinui; Biggs, Bruce (2004). Ngā iwi o Tainui : nga koorero tuku iho a nga tuupuna = The traditional history of the Tainui people. Auckland [N.Z.]: Auckland University Press. ISBN 1869403312.
