= Waata Roore Erueti =

Tainui historian

Waata Roore Erueti (1868–1952), known simply as Roore Erueti and occasionally with the surname Edwards (the English equivalent of Erueti) was a Tainui historian and a noted repository of whakapapa. He served as an advisor to King Korokī Mahuta and as the spokesperson for Kingitanga leader, Te Puea Herangi. In 1946, Roore accepted the compensation settlement for the 1864 Confiscation of Waikato Land by the Crown speaking on Te Puea's behalf. In 1947, Roore was appointed as an Officer of the Order of the British Empire (OBE) for his service to the Māori people (see 1947 Birthday Honours (New Zealand)#Officer (OBE)).

== Ngāti Māhanga ==
Roore was born in 1868 at Ngāruawāhia, north of Hamilton. His mother was Rāhera Waata of Ngāti Kuku, a hapū of Ngāti Māhanga. Roore was raised by his uncle, Te Aopouri Waata. In his late twenties, Roore had already begun to make regular appearances in the Native Land Court, reciting complex descent lines and possessed of narratives that filled the gaps in the evidence of other witnesses. In the post-confiscation context, there was a contest for remaining Māori land blocks and having whakapapa knowledge improved the chances of a successful outcome for the hapū. Successful witnesses quickly became spokesman and leaders.

== Ngāti Apakura ==
Roore's skillset took him further afield. His father was Hemi Erueti of Ngāti Apakura, Ngāti Puhiawe and Ngāti Hikairo. Although not to the same extent as his involvement with Ngāti Mahanga, Rore both acknowledged and participated in matters pertinent to his father's people. In 1947, Rore was a co-petitioner of Karena Tamaki's Petition 29/1947 to the Crown relating to Ngāti Apakura land near Lake Ngāroto.

== Historical accounts that reference Roore Erueti/Edwards ==
- Journal of the Polynesian Society Volume.64:189, 191, 195; Volume 65:54 Genealogies I & II; Volume 71:305.
- Leslie Kelly (1949)Tainui: the story of Hoturoa and his descendants
- Pei Te Hurinui Jones; Bruce Biggs (1995). Nga Iwi o Tainui: The Traditional History of the Tainui People/Nga Koorero Tuku Iho o Nga Tuupuna. Auckland University Press. ISBN 1869401190.
- Pei Te Hurinui Jones King Potatau.

Waata Roore Edwards died in 1952 at the age of 84 years.
