= Ngāti Māhanga =

New Zealand Māori tribe

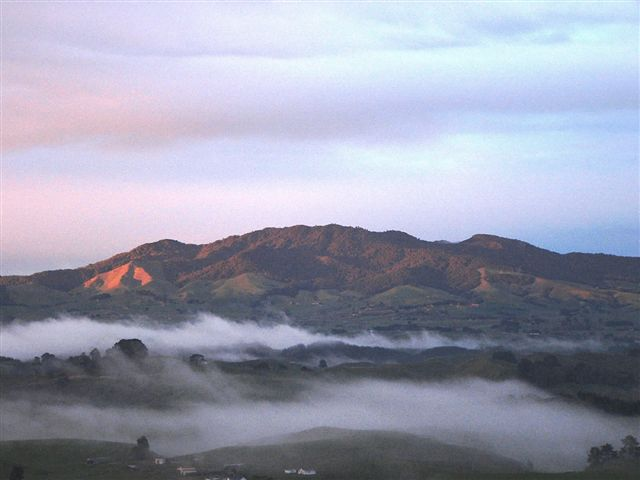

Ngāti Māhanga is a Māori iwi (tribe) that is part of the Waikato confederation of tribes (now called Tainui). The tribe's historical lands extended from Whaingaroa Harbour (Raglan Harbour) to the west bank of the Waikato River in the city of Hamilton, New Zealand. The Waikato land confiscation of 1864 meant that Ngāti Māhanga and their associated hapū were pushed to west of the Waipā River.

== Māhanga, the ancestor ==
Ngāti Māhanga is named after Māhanga, a Waikato chief and an 11th generation descendant of Hoturoa, the navigator of Tainui waka. Māhanga lived approximately 15 generations ago and was the son of Tūheitia and Te Ataihaea. The Maori king Tūheitia Paki was a namesake of the ancestor Tūheitia. Māhanga is a key ancestor of Waikato, as all the Waikato iwi trace their descent from him. Ngāti Māhanga however, is a particular reference to the descendants of his sons: Kiekieraunui, Tupanamaiwaho, Tonganui, Ruateatea and Atutahi. The main hapu of Ngāti Māhanga today are Ngāti Ruateatea, Ngāti Kuku, Ngāti Tonganui and Ngāti Hourua. In former times, there were upward of 20 hapū.

== Pā/marae ==
Ngāti Māhanga have three pā (marae complex): Aramiro Pa (also referred to as Te Kaharoa Marae) in the Waitetuna Valley; Omaero Pa, in Whatawhata; and Te Papa-o-Rotu Marae, also in Whatawhata. Te Papa-o-Rotu Marae is considered to be the tribe's headquarters and is the venue of the annual poukai hosted by Ngāti Māhanga on 10 April. Te Papa-o-Rotu was renowned as the Whare Wananga o Waikato (traditional house of learning).

In 2010 the numbers enrolled as Ngāti Māhanga on the Waikato-Tainui beneficiary roll were: Te Papa-o-Rotu 2,214, Te Papatapu 1,831, Aramiro 896, Mōtakotako 607 and Ō-maero 481.

== Notable people ==
- Wiremu Neera Te Awaitaia (c.1796–1866), chief
- Waata Roore Erueti (1868–1952), historian
- Nancy Wake (1912–2011), French Resistance hero, World War II
- Melanie Drewery (born 1970), children's book author and illustrator
