= Tainui (canoe) =

Māori migration canoe

- Great Māori migration waka
- Commander: Hoturoa
- Priest: Rakatāura aka Hape
- Landed at: Whangaparaoa, Bay of Plenty, Kāwhia
- Iwi: Waikato, Ngāti Maniapoto, Hauraki, Ngāti Raukawa, Ngāti Toa, Ngāti Rārua, Ngāti Koata, Ngāti Marutūahu, Te Kawerau a Maki, Ngā Puhi and Ngāi Tai.

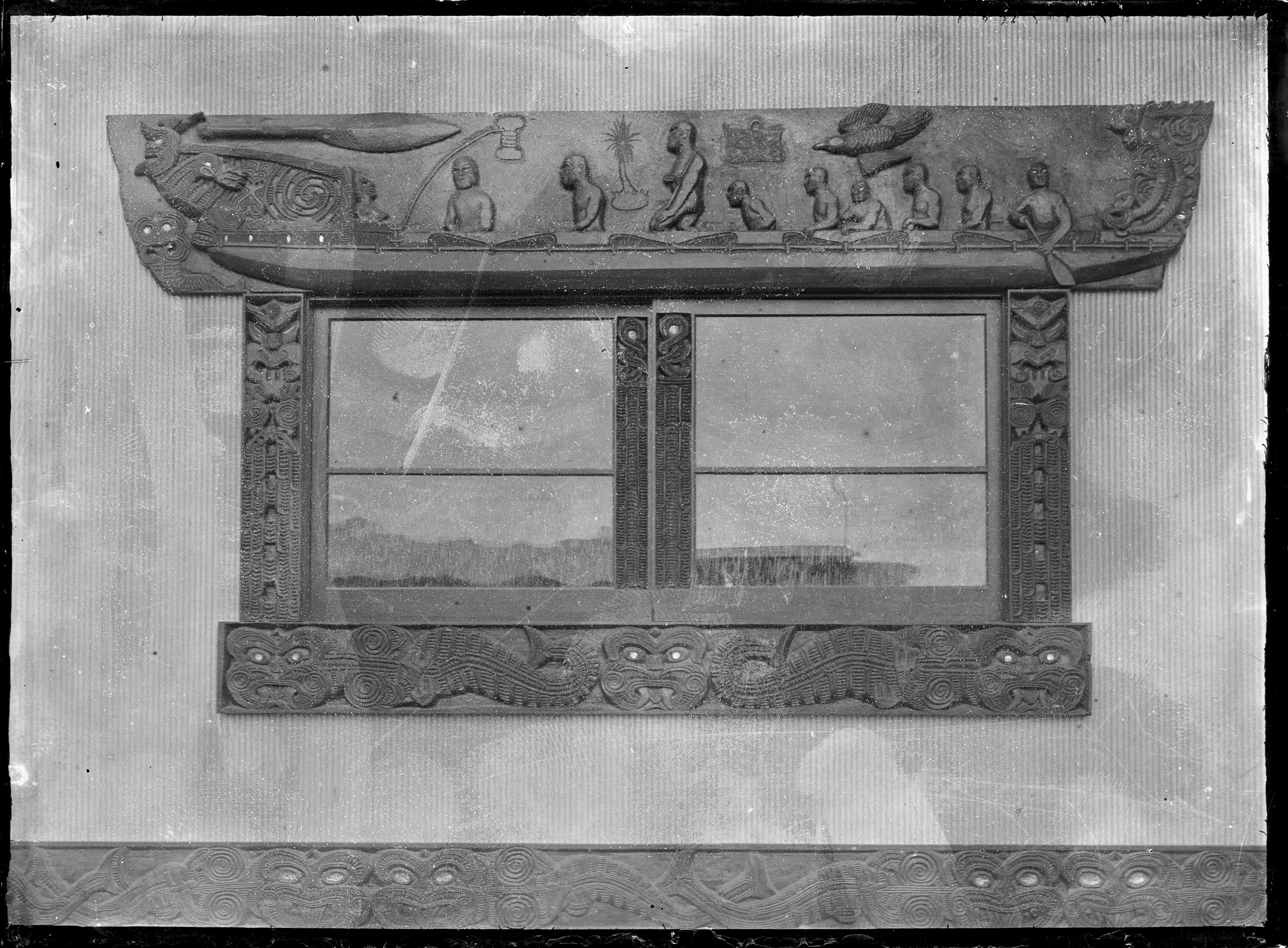
The korupe (carving over the window frame) at Mahina-a-Rangi meeting house at Turangawaewae Marae, Ngāruawāhia showing the Tainui canoe with its captain Hoturoa. Above the canoe is Te Hoe-o-Tainui, a famous paddle, the kete (basket) given to Whakaotirangi by a tohunga of Hawaiki, the bird Parakaraka (front) who was able to see in the dark, and another bird who warned of approaching daylight. Photograph by Albert Percy Godber circa 1930s

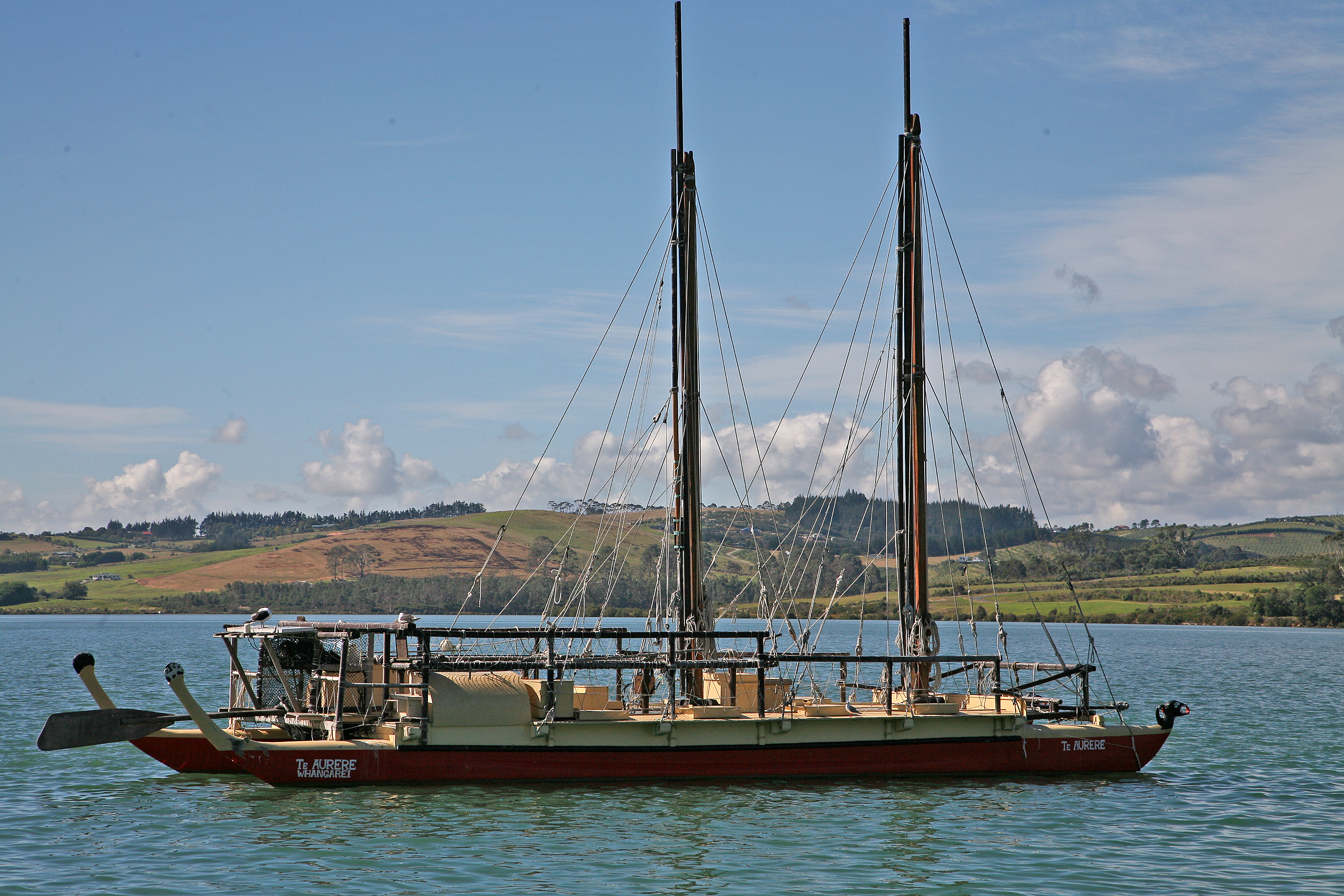
Te Aurere, a modern reconstruction of a sea-going waka (canoe).

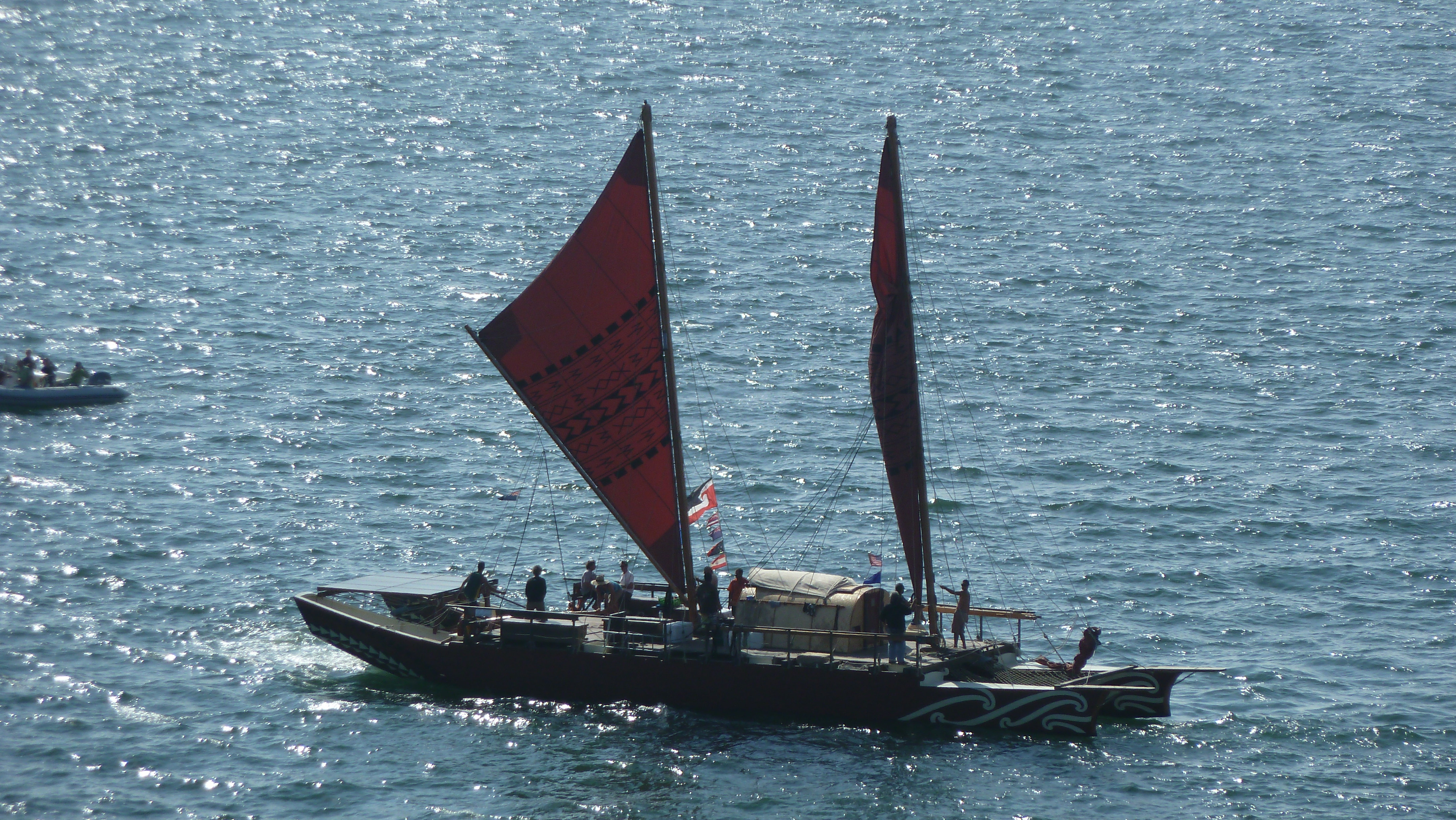
Te Haunui, a modern reconstruction of a sea-going waka (canoe).

Tainui was one of the great ocean-going canoes in which Polynesians migrated to New Zealand approximately 800 years ago. It was commanded by the chief Hoturoa, who had decided to leave Hawaiki because over-population had led to famine and warfare. The ship first reached New Zealand at Whangaparāoa in the Bay of Plenty and then skirted around the north coast of the North Island, finally landing at Kawhia in the western Waikato. The crew of the Tainui were the ancestors of the iwi that form the Tainui confederation.

== Crafting ==
According to traditional folklore, the Tainui waka (canoe) was made from a great tree, at a place in Hawaiki known then as Maungaroa, on the spot where a stillborn child had been buried. According to Te Tāhuna Herangi the waka was named after the child who had been called Tainui. The canoe was made by Rakatāura, an expert boat builder in the tradition of Rātā, or according to Wirihana Aoterangi by Rātā himself. It was built with three adzes (toki): Hahau-te-pō ('Chop the night-world') to chop down the tree, Paopao-te-rangi ('Shatter the heavens') to split the wood, and Manu-tawhio-rangi ('Bird encircling the sky') to shape it.

The first two times that the tree was chopped down, it was found to be standing again the next morning. On the third occasion, Rakatāura stayed at the site overnight and discovered that the tree was being magically reassembled at night by birds led by the porihawa (a relative of the Hokioi). An old woman, Māhu-rangi (or Maru-a-nuku) gave them some grated kumara which she instructed him to place on the stump and a karakia (incantation, prayer) for chopping down trees, called Te Karakia o te Tuanga o te Rākau ('The tree-felling spell').

During the construction process, one of the workers, Kohiti-nui, covered himself with wood-chips and dust so that it would seem that he had been working hard and would take all the best food for himself. Rakatāura noticed this and killed him, burying him in the wood-chips. Because of this murder, when the canoe was finished, it would not move and could not be hauled down to the sea, and the karakia o te Tōanga ('the hauling spell') did not work. Then Hoturoa sang a special incantation, which sent Kohiti-nui's spirit out to sea in the form of a fly and the men were able to haul the canoe down to the sea.

According to Pei Te Hurinui Jones the waka was named Tainui because when it first went into the water, it did not ride smoothly and one of Hoturoa's wives, perhaps Marama, shouted out "Hoturoa, your canoe is tainui (very heavy)". According to D. M. Stafford, the Arawa canoe was made alongside the Tainui for Tama-te-kapua.

== Description and crew ==
The waka was thirty cubits long (13.5 metres) - the distance is preserved by two stone pillars, Puna and Hani, at the Maketū marae in Kawhia. It had a small ama (an outrigger), called Takere-aotea ('cloudy hull'), and three sails. Because it was made in a hurry, the waka had no carvings.

Tradition records the names of forty crew-members, twenty-nine men and eleven women. The men were:

- Hoturoa, chief of the canoe, who sat at the stern
- Ngātoro-i-rangi, who sat at the bow and was navigator, as far as Rarotonga
- Rakatāura, the tohunga (priest)
- Taikehu, who sat at the baling point and held the sacred paddle, Hahau-te-rangi ('Chop the Heavens')
- Tai-ninihi, who kept the kura (feather treasures)
- Hiaroa, who carried the mauri o te manu (bird talismans)
- Rotu, who sat at the bow
- Riukiuta, the tohunga, and navigator after Rarotonga
- Poutūkeka, Hoturoa's son
- Kopuwai (later renamed Tarapounamu)
- Kahungunu
- Rangi-whakairi-ao
- Hāpopo, Poutūkeka's son, Hoturoa's grandson
- Hotuāwhio, Hoturoa's son
- Taunga-ki-te-marangai
- Hautai
- Te Huaki-o-te-rangi
- Uhenga
- Hotunui, Hoturoa's younger brother
- Horo-iwi
- Te Kete-ana-taua
- Tāiki
- Maru-kōpiri
- Tai-haua
- Tāne-whakatia
- Taranga
- Waihare
- Mateora, who carried the mauri o te manu (bird talismans)
- Hotuope, son of Hoturoa and ancestor of the main line of Tainui
- Tari-toronga

The women were:

- Whakaotirangi, wife of Hoturoa
- Marama-kiko-hura (Marama of the bare flesh) or Marama-hahake (Marama the naked)
- Kahu-keke or Kahupeka, daughter of Hoturoa
- Kearoa or Keataketake, wife of Ngātoro-i-rangi
- Whaene-muru-tio, sister of Rakatāura
- Hine-puanga-nui-a-rangi, sister of Rakatāura
- Hēara or Hiaroa, sister of Rakatāura
- Amonga, wife of Pou-tūkeka
- Takahi-roa, wife of Pou-tūkeka
- Kahu-tuiroa
- Hinewai
- Tōrere

== Voyage ==
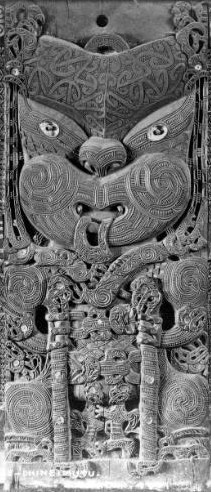
Tama-te-kapua, leader of Arawa (Ohinemutu, Rotorua, ca. 1880).

Tainui was one of the last waka to leave Hawaiki for New Zealand. It departed on Uenuku's night, the fourth night in the month of Hakihea (roughly December). When the people warned Hoturoa that this period of the month, Tamatea (the new moon), is characterised by wind and storms, he said, "Let me and Tamatea fight it out at sea!" The way out of the lagoon into the open sea was barred by waves and a sacred tree, but Ngātoro-i-rangi sang an incantation which calmed the sea.

Several Tuamotuan stories tell of canoes named Tainui, Tainuia (captained by Hoturoa) and Tainui-atea (captained by Tahorotakarari), that left the Tuamotus and never returned.

On its voyage the Tainui stopped at many Pacific islands. On Rarotonga, they encountered some distant relatives and invited them to accompany them to New Zealand, but they refused. The island of Tangi'ia ('farewell') is named for this encounter. Also on Rarotonga, they encountered Tama-te-kapua, chief of the Arawa waka, who kidnapped Ngātoro-i-rangi and his wife Kearoa. Riu-ki-uta took over as Tainui's navigator. Riu-ki-uta summoned the sea taniwha, Mawake-nui-o-rangi, Pane-iraira, Ihe, and Mangō-hikuroa, and seventy-six others, to guide the waka. An incantation by Taikehu caused the canoe to travel quickly.

=== Arrival ===
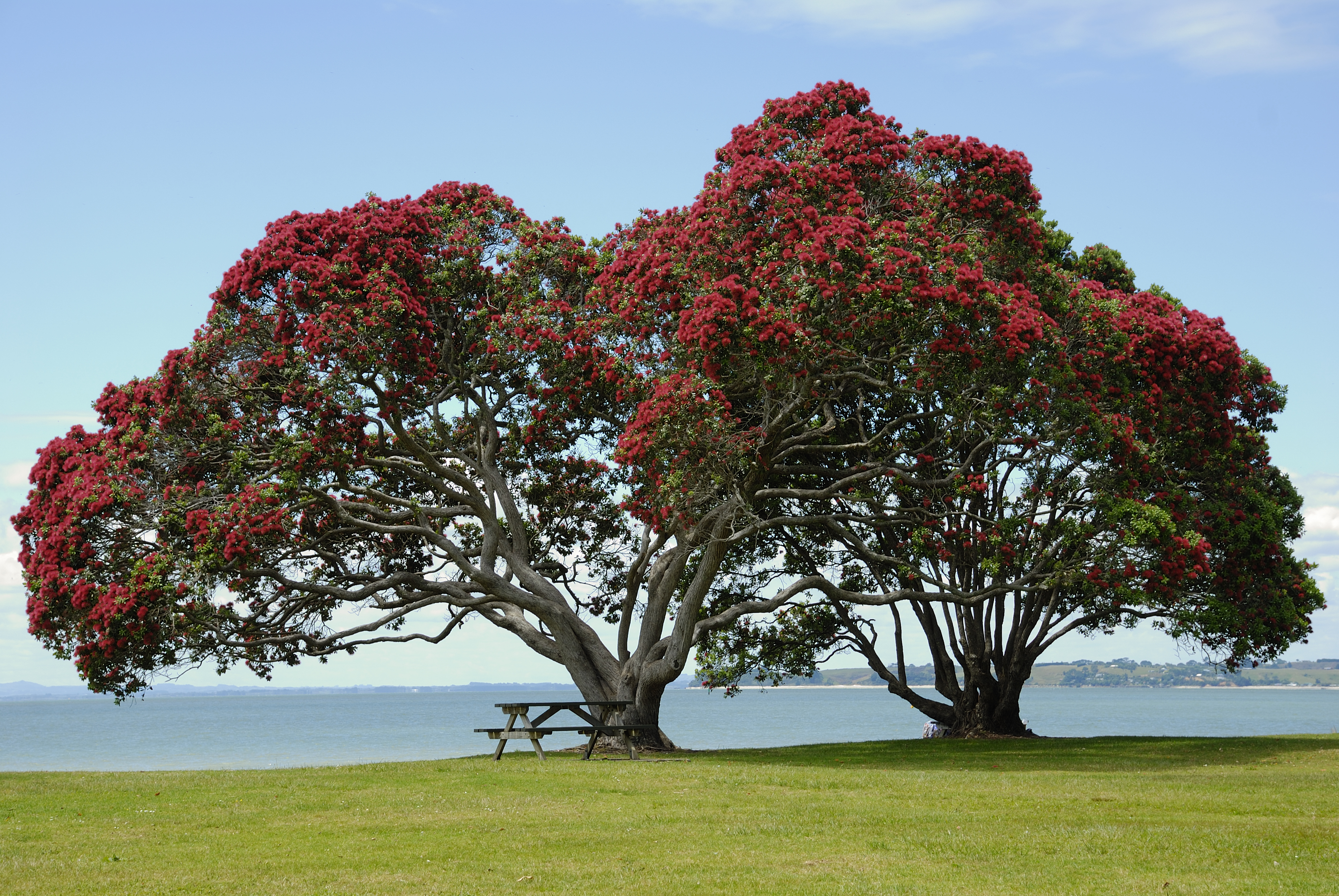
Pōhutukawa trees in flower

When Tainui arrived in New Zealand, it was surrounded by birds and Rotu sang an incantation to the birds to bring them to shore. This first landfall was at Whangaparāoa near Cape Runaway in Te Moana-a-Toi (the Bay of Plenty). Seeing the red flowers of the pōhutukawa trees, two of the men, Hāpopo and Taininihi, threw away their red-feather head-dresses, thinking that they could use the flowers instead. The feathers were found on the beach by Māhina and Mā-ihīhi, who refused to return them. As they were coming in to land, they were so inexperienced with the region that Tainui was caught in a current and smashed against a rock, but they were able to right the waka and make landfall. Then Rakatāura threw his own hair into the sea, allowing the sea taniwha that had been guiding the Tainui on the open sea to depart.

The other waka had arrived before Tainui, but their crews had gone out to investigate the land. Hoturoa built a tuahu (altar) and had the anchor rope of Tainui placed beneath that of the other waka. When the other crews returned, Hoturoa pointed to these things as evidence that Tainui had actually arrived first. This incident is the subject of much dispute between Tainui and Arawa, who tell a similar story, but with the roles reversed.

=== Whangaparāoa to Tāmaki ===
Places visited by Tainui in Tāmaki (modern Auckland)
1 Motutapu island
2 Takapuna
3 Tāmaki River
4 Taurere
5 Te Tatua-a-Riukiuta
6 Ōtāhuhu

From Whangaparoa, Tainui sailed along the coast of the Bay of Plenty to the west. At Taumata-o-Apanui, one of the women in the waka, Tōrere, jumped out of the boat in the night and swam ashore, because she was angry with Rakatāura. She hid herself in a bush at Tōrere and Rakatāura was not able to find her. She married a local man Manāki-ao and became the ancestor of Ngāitai. At Hāwai, one of the men, Tari-toronga, left the ship, headed inland and settled on the Mōtū River.

Tainui was accompanied by Arawa, as far as Whitianga, where the crews of Tainui and Arawa had a meeting on Great Mercury Island, after which Tainui continued alone. One of sails of the waka was left at a cliff near Whitianga, which is now known as Te Rā o Tainui ('the sail of Tainui'). At Wharenga, they erected a stone altar at the place known as Kohatu-whakairi ('Hanging Stone'), formerly a sacred place for the Tainui people. As they rounded the Coromandel Peninsula, the crew wept for Arawa and the other waka that they had left behind, and as a result they named the bay that they were sailing into Tīkapa Moana, 'the Mournful sea' (the Hauraki Gulf).

The waka landed at Tararu and Wai-whakapukuhanga, where they left one of their anchors, then to Wharekawa, where people who had already settled told the crew that there was another sea to the west (Tasman Sea). Hoturoa's wife, Marama-kiko-hura, decided to make the crossing by land, planning to meet up with the rest of the crew at Ōtāhuhu. As she went, she sang the 'karakia urūru-whenua' ('the incantation for entering new lands') and carried the Tainui's treasures. Continuing on, Tainui passed Motutapu island and fetched up at Takapuna in the Waitematā Harbour. There, Taikehu encouraged Hoturoa to go out and look for the sea to the west. When Hoturoa returned he said he had seen kanae (grey mullet) leaping in the waves, known thereafter as 'pōtiki a Taikehu' (Taikehu's children).

At the mouth of the Tāmaki River, several members of the crew went ashore. Tāiki settled at Ōtāiki. Horoiwi took the cape to the east of the river, naming it Te Pane o Horoiwi (Bucklands Beach). Te Kete-ana-taua settled at Taurere, with her son Taihaua, and they became the ancestors of Ngāi Tai ki Tāmaki. Further to the west, at Te Tatua-a-Riukiuta (Three Kings), Riu-ki-uta settled and became the ancestor of Ngāti Riukiuta. Poutūkeka, Hāpopo, Te Uhenga, and Hautai also settled on the Tamaki isthmus (present-day Auckland).

Hoturoa decided that Tāmaki was overpopulated and that they could carry on in search of new lands. According to one tradition, reported by Aoterangi, they carried the waka overland to Manukau Harbour on the west coast at Ōtāhuhu, after rendezvousing with Marama-kiko-hura there. As they hauled the canoe across the isthmus on rollers, however, it stuck and would not move. Riutiuka reported that this was because Marama-kiko-hura had violated tapu with one of the crew or with a local man during her journey. Repeating the special incantation the Hoturoa had used to haul Tainui into the sea in Hawaiki, they were able to get the canoe moving.

=== Quarrel between Hoturoa and Rakatāura ===
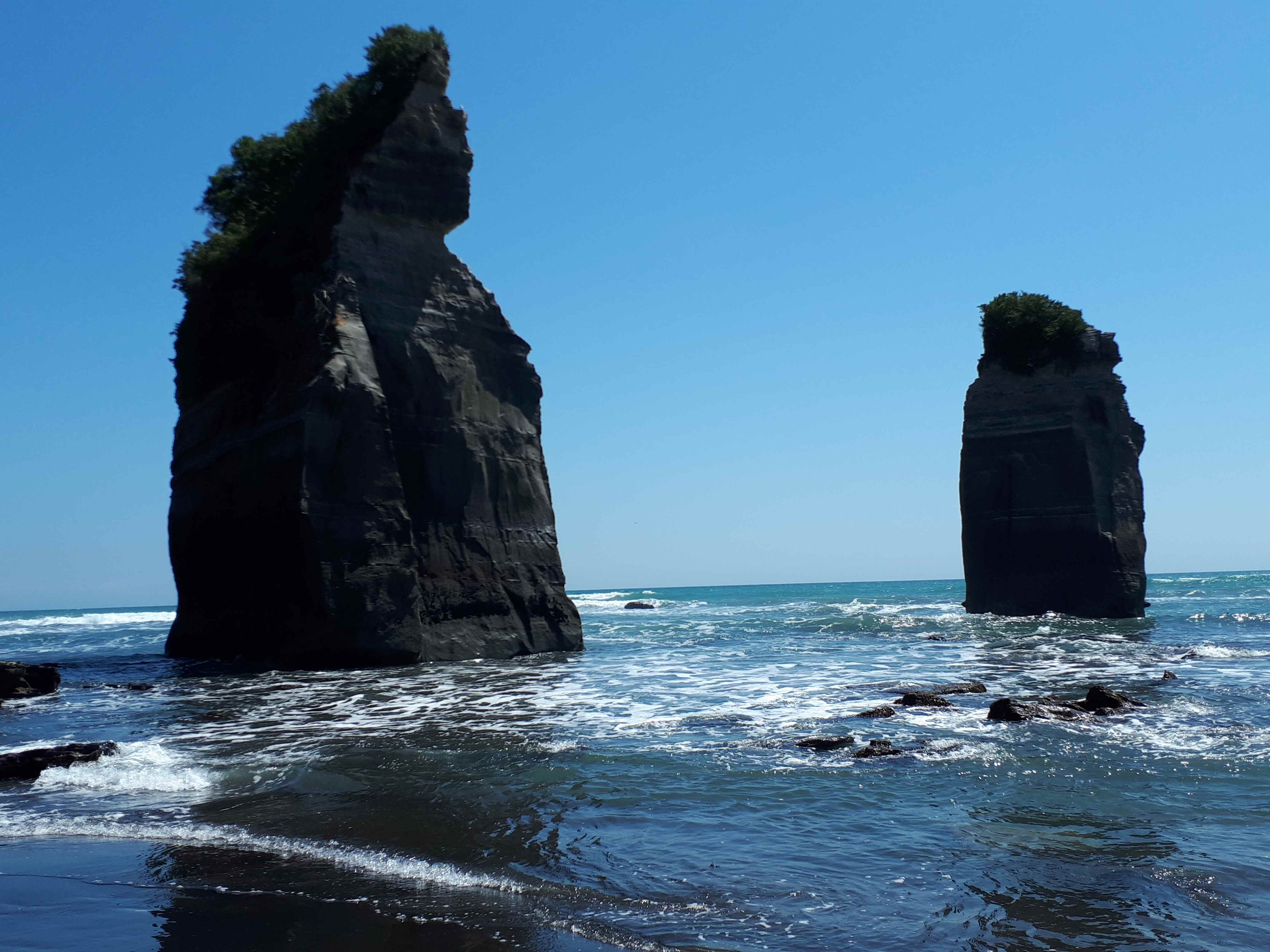
Rock pillars at Mōkau beach, said to be mooring pillars of Tainui.

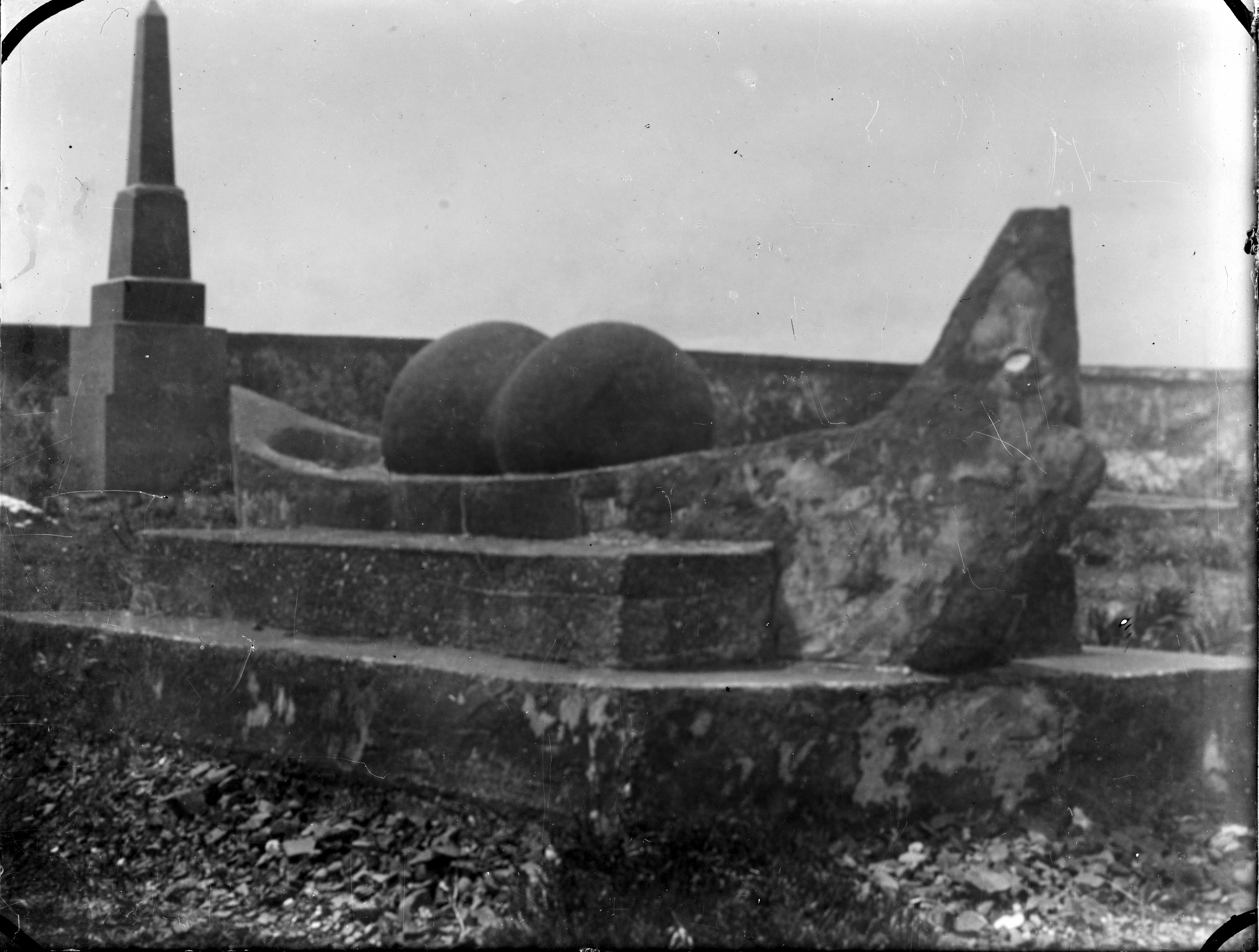
Stone anchor of Tainui at the mouth of the Mōkau River.

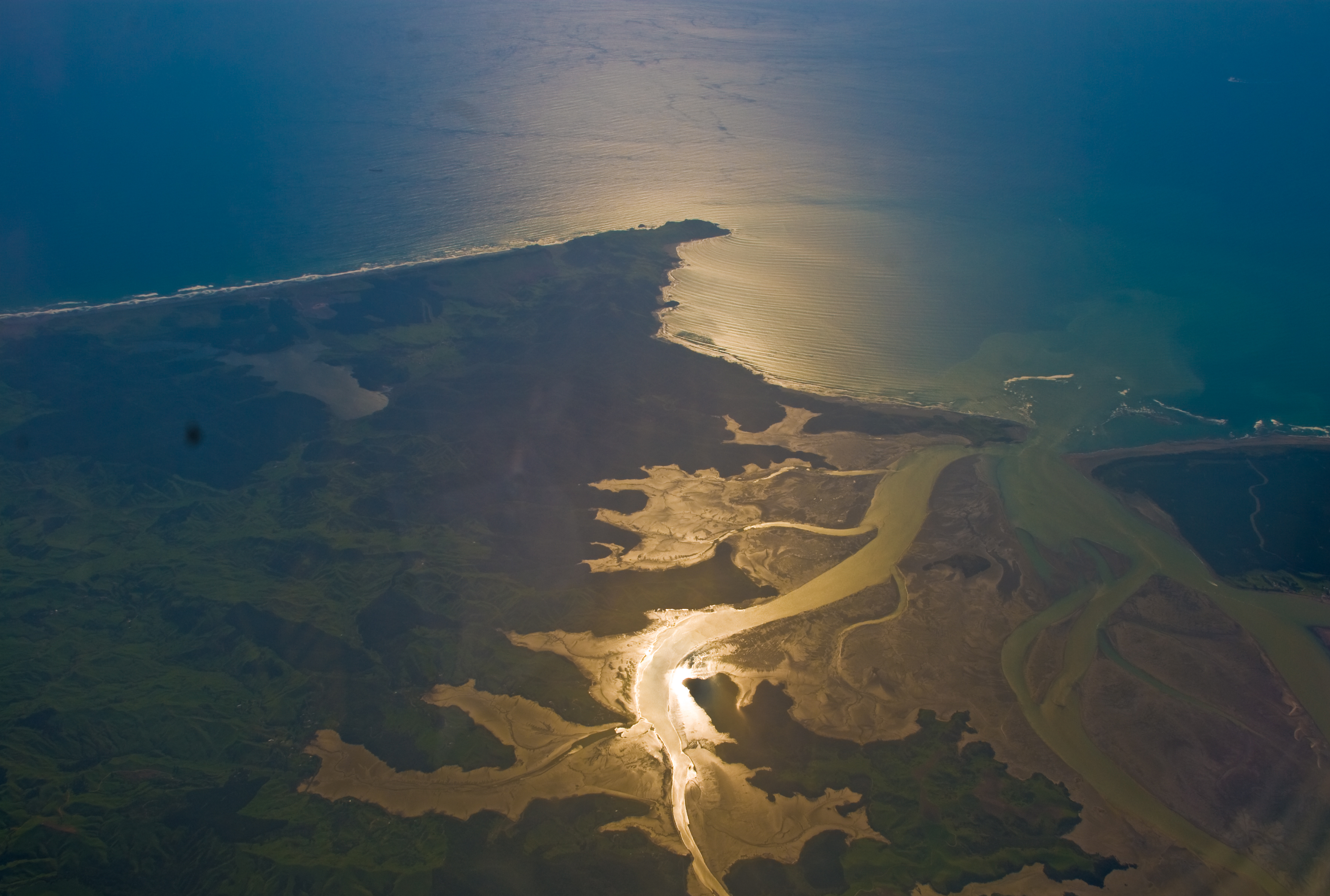
Aerial view of Kāwhia Harbour.

According to another tradition, however, it was Rakatāura who was to sing the special incantation, but when he was about to do so, his sister Hiaroa abused him for helping Hoturoa when the latter had refused to allow him to marry Hoturoa's daughter Kahukeke. As a result, Rakatāura left the crew and Tainui had to sail all the way around Northland. Meanwhile, Rakatāura went inland with ten of his relatives along the Hakarimata Range. One of his relatives, Rotu, stopped here and established an altar at a place called Tanekaitu. Hiaroa went on to Pu-karamea-nui and established an altar at a place called Moekakara. At Mount Roskill or Puketutu Island, Rakatāura and Hiaroa lit a fire and sung incantations to prevent Tainui from entering the Manukau Harbour. Then Rakatāura and Hiaroa went south, meeting the Waikato River at Ruakokopu and crossing it at Te Piko o Hiaroa ('Hiaroa's Bend'). They climbed up Karioi Mountain, built an altar called Tuāhu-papa, and sung incantations to prevent Tainui from entering Raglan harbour. Again, they sang incantations at Ngairo to prevent Tainui from entering Aotea Harbour or Kawhia Harbour.

As the Tainui travelled south, its bailer was swept overboard at Te Karaka (near Waikaretu), where it is said to have been transformed into a rock that can be seen today. At the mouth of the Mimi river, Tainui came ashore and Hoturoa planted a pohutukawa tree, which was still living as of 1912. The area had already been settled by one of Hoturoa's relatives, Awangaiariki from the Tokomaru waka, so they turned around and began to head north once more. At the mouth of the Mōkau River, three rocks are said to be mooring stakes used by the canoe and another anchor was left behind. Hoturoa disembarked and travelled north by land. At Whareorino he encountered Rakatāura and they reconciled.

Together, they brought Tainui in to Kāwhia harbour and hauled it ashore. Hoturoa set up an altar on the site, called Puna-whakatupu-tangata ('The Source of Mankind') and Rakatāura set up one called Hani. The waka was buried at Maketu marae, where it remains to this day.

Whakaotirangi, Hoturoa's wife, settled at Pakarikari near Kāwhia Harbour and established a kūmara garden. The people of the Tainui waka settled at Kāwhia Harbour, and expanded their territory inland in the Waikato region over the following generations, under the leadership of Tūrongo, Rereahu, and Whāita.

=== Subsequent journeys ===
According to Percy Smith, after landing at Kāwhia, Tainui was taken south to Taranaki, where Hine-moana-te-waiwai of Ngāti Hikawai married the Tainui crewman Kopuwai, who was renamed Tarapounamu, after a large pounamu spearhead that had formed Hine-moana-te-waiwai's dowry. Later, Tarapounamu wanted to see the South Island, so he took Tainui and headed south. At Mōkau River he left an anchor and a stand of Pomaderris apetala trees (called tainui in Māori). Then he landed at Te Waiiti (near New Plymouth) and allowed Tainui to become full of excrement. As a result, Hoturoa had Tainui seized and brought back to Kawhia. Tarapounamu had descendants on D'Urville Island.

== See also ==
- List of Māori waka

== Bibliography ==
- Craig, RD (1989). Dictionary of Polynesian Mythology. New York: Greenwood Press. p. 253.
- Jones, Pei Te Hurinui; Biggs, Bruce (2004). Ngā iwi o Tainui : nga koorero tuku iho a nga tuupuna = The traditional history of the Tainui people. Auckland [N.Z.]: Auckland University Press. pp. 16–50. ISBN 1869403312.
- Stafford, D.M. (1967). Te Arawa: A History of the Arawa People. Rotorua, New Zealand: A.H. & A.W. Reed.
- Stimson, J. Frank; Marshall, Donald Stanley (2013) [1964]. Dictionary of Some Tuamotuan Dialects of the Polynesian Languages. Salem: Peabody Museum. p. 485. ISBN 978-94-017-5862-8.
- Taonui, Rāwiri (21 December 2006). "Canoe traditions". Te Ara – the Encyclopedia of New Zealand. Archived from the original on 17 December 2007.
- Te Tumu O Tainui. 1986.
- Walker, Ranginui (2004). "Nga Korero o Nehera". Ka Whawhai Tonu Matou - Struggle Without End (Second ed.). Auckland, New Zealand: Penguin Books. p. 46. ISBN 9780143019459.
