= Castle Craig (disambiguation) =

Castle Craig may be:

- Castle Craig, Connecticut, USA
- Castlecraig, Black Isle, Scotland
- Castle Craig Hospital, Scottish Borders
- Castle Craig Rock, Waikato, New Zealand
