= Kōkako (Tainui) =

Kōkako was a Māori rangatira (chieftain) of the Tainui tribal confederation in the Waikato region of New Zealand. He probably lived in the late sixteenth century.

== Life ==
Places in the life of Kōkako.
1 Marokopa
2 Āwhitu Peninsula
3 Kāniwhaniwha / Pūrākau
4 Tai-pōuri island

Kōkako was the son of Manu-Tongātea of Ngāti Ruanui and Mātaatua descent from Marokopa, south of Kāwhia. According to Pei Te Hurinui Jones, his mother was Wawara from the Lake Rotoiti region, whom his father married during a military campaign into the Bay of Plenty region. According to this version, he was named after the Kōkako birds which the war-party ate during their march.

In a version told to Bruce Biggs by Elsie Turnbull, Manu-Tongātea is instead a man of Maungatautari, who committed adultery with a lady of Marokopa and left behind a kōkako-feather cloak after which Kōkako is named.

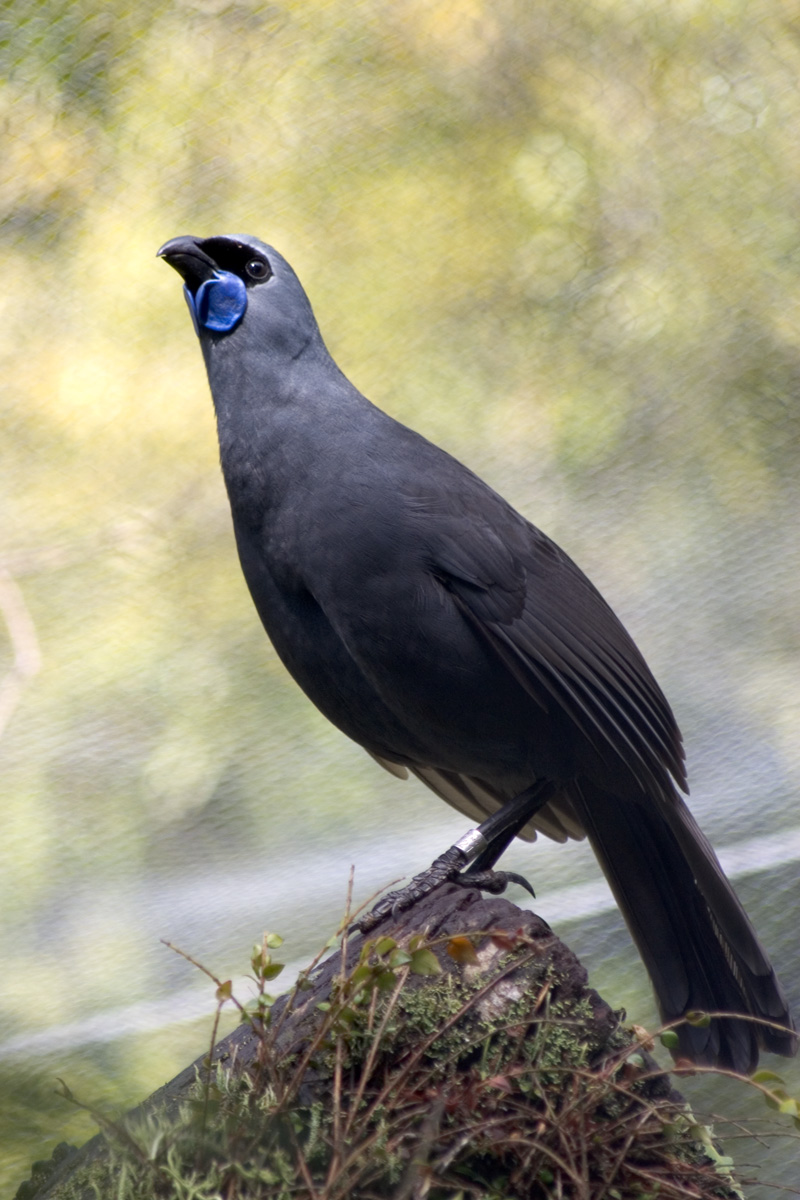
Kōkako was named after the Kōkako bird.

=== Invasion of Āwhitu ===
After spending some time in Marokopa, Kōkako led a raiding party down the Waikato River and into Manukau Harbour, where they seized the Āwhitu Peninsula. This brought them into conflict with the famous warrior, Tūheitia. After some fighting, Kōkako withdrew to Kāwhia.

=== Rape of Whaea-tāpoko ===
In the Kāwhia region, Kōkako encountered a female rangatira named Whaea-tāpoko, who belonged to Ngāti Taupiri. Since she was recently widowed, she was under tapu, but Kōkako wanted to marry her anyway. Therefore, he pretended to be thirsty in the night, leading Whaea-tāpoko to send one of her slaves to fetch him some water. Kōkako followed the slave, leapt out at her, and smashed her gourd. When Whaea-tāpoko heard what had happened, she came out to investigate and Kōkako raped her. After he had finished, Kōkako told that if she had a child she should name it Tamainu-pō ('Son-of-the-drink-by-night') or Pare-inupō ('Daughter-of-the-drink-by-night'). In the end, she had a boy, Tamainu-pō.

=== Battle of Kiri-parera ===
Then Kōkako went back north to Āwhitu, where, according to one account, he drowned Tūheitia by means of a trick, but Tūheitia's son Māhanga continued the fight.

After some time, Māhanga moved south into the Waikato, settling near Te Pahu, where the Kāniwhaniwha stream meets the Waipā River, at a village called Kāniwhaniwha or Pūrākau. Therefore, Kōkako came south with a war party and built a fortress at Kiri-parera, just downstream from Kāniwhaniwha.

When Māhanga's force approached Kiri-parera, they saw Kōkako's forces hiding ready for an ambush near the gateway. Among Māhanga's forces was Kōkako's son, Taimainu-pō, who had gone into exile after an argument with his older half-brother. He shouted for Māhanga's forces to charge and then used the distraction to sneak over the palisade into the fortress and search for Kōkako. While he was still on the fence, Kōkako's forces broke and fled into their fortress and Tamainu-pō caught sight of his father, recognising him by his red feather-cloak. He leapt down on him, pushed him into the ditch, snatched off his cloak, and let him flee.

Kōkako withdrew to the island of Tai-pōuri near Rangiriri on the Waikato River (or Okarahea according to Mohi Te Rongomau).

=== Reconciliation with Taimainu-pō and Māhanga ===
Sometime later, Taimainu-pō had a son with Tū-kōtuku, daughter of Māhanga and wished for the baby to receive the tohi baptismal ritual from his own father, so he came down the river with his wife and newborn son and walked straight to the largest house in the village. The people cried out that the house was tapu and Kōkako came out to investigate the shouting. Then Tamainu-pō revealed his name, handed Kōkako his patu and cloak, presented his wife and his child. Kōkako led them to the tūāhu altar and performed the tohi ritual for both Tamainu-pō and his newborn son, naming him Wairere. Kōkako agreed to return to Kāniwhaniwha with Tamainu-pō and make peace with Māhanga.

=== Family ===
Kōkako married Punanga and had two sons:

- Urutonga, an ancestor of Ngāi Te Rangi
- Te Aweto, who married Puketoa.

By Whaea-tāpoko he was the father of Tamainu-pō, the ancestor of Ngāti Tamainupo.

According to an 1849 account by Āperāhama Taonui, Kōkako was also the father of Reitū and Reipae, but other accounts make them his great-granddaughters or the daughters of Māhanga.

== Sources ==
The story of Kōkako is recorded by Pei Te Hurinui Jones based on an oral account which he heard from Te Nguha Huirama of Ngāti Tamainu-pō, Ngāti Maniapoto, and Ngāti Te Ata on 24 May 1932. The story is also reported in an 1871 manuscript by Wiremu Te Wheoro, which was published in John White The Ancient History of the Maori: IV Tainui (1888).

== Bibliography ==
- Jones, Pei Te Hurinui; Biggs, Bruce (2004). Ngā iwi o Tainui : nga koorero tuku iho a nga tuupuna = The traditional history of the Tainui people. Auckland [N.Z.]: Auckland University Press. ISBN 1869403312.
- White, John (1888). The Ancient History of the Maori: IV Tainui.
