= Castle Craig Rock =

Rock in the Waikato region of New Zealand

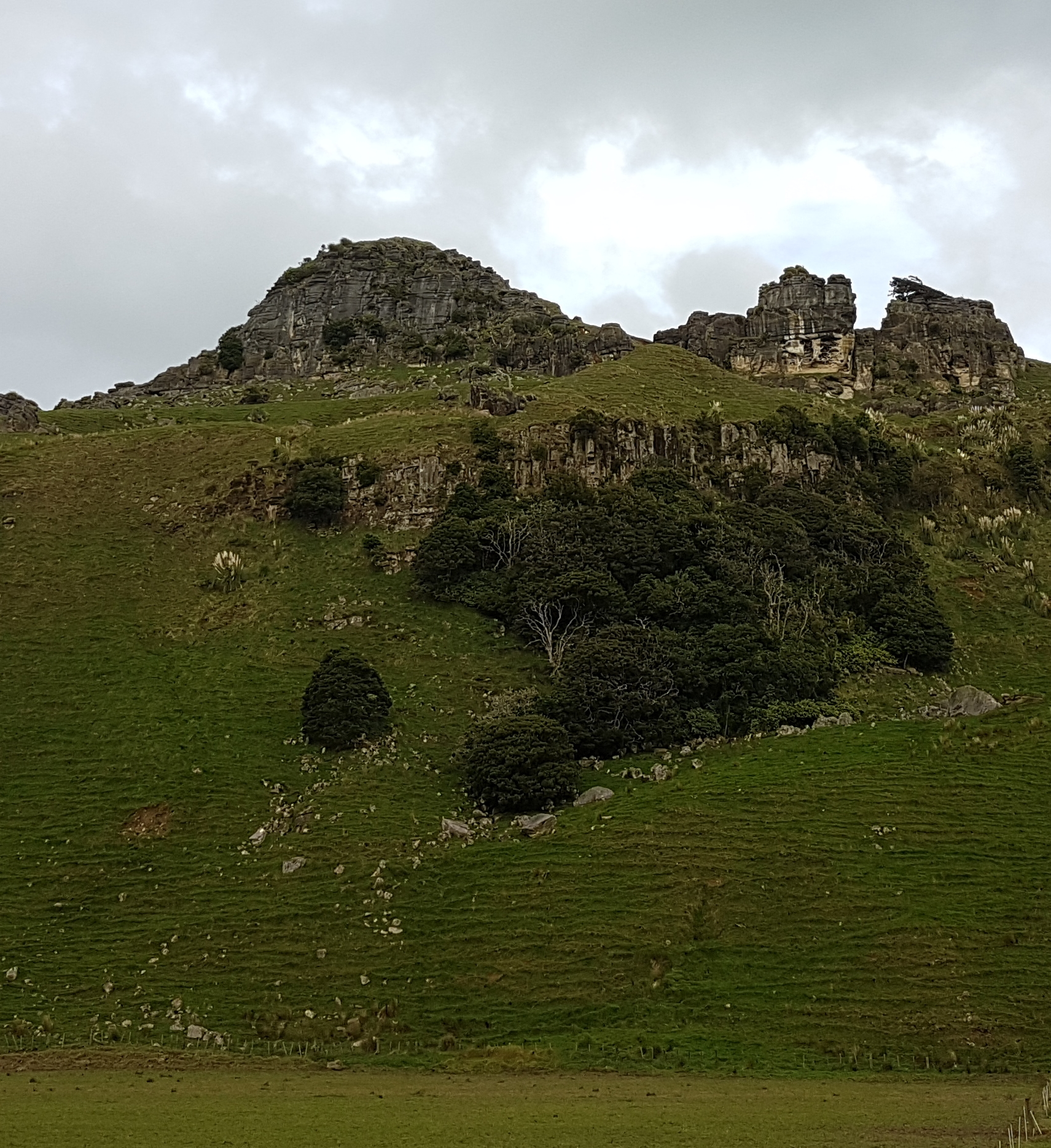
- Castle Craig Rock

Highest point
- Elevation: 186 m (610 ft)
- Prominence: 180 m
- Parent peak: Stone Table
- Coordinates: 38°15′34″S 174°49′17″E

Geography
- Location: Waikato District, New Zealand

Castle Craig Rock is a prominent geological feature to the south of Kawhia Harbour in the Waikato region of New Zealand. It is located 9 kilometres (5.6 mi) from Marokopa, Waikato, New Zealand, above the valley of the Marokopa River. Castle Craig Rock is a type of flaggy Limestone (sandstone). It stands 610 feet (186m) above sea level and provides an expansive view of Castle Craig Farm, an organic beef farm, plus the little town of Awamarino.

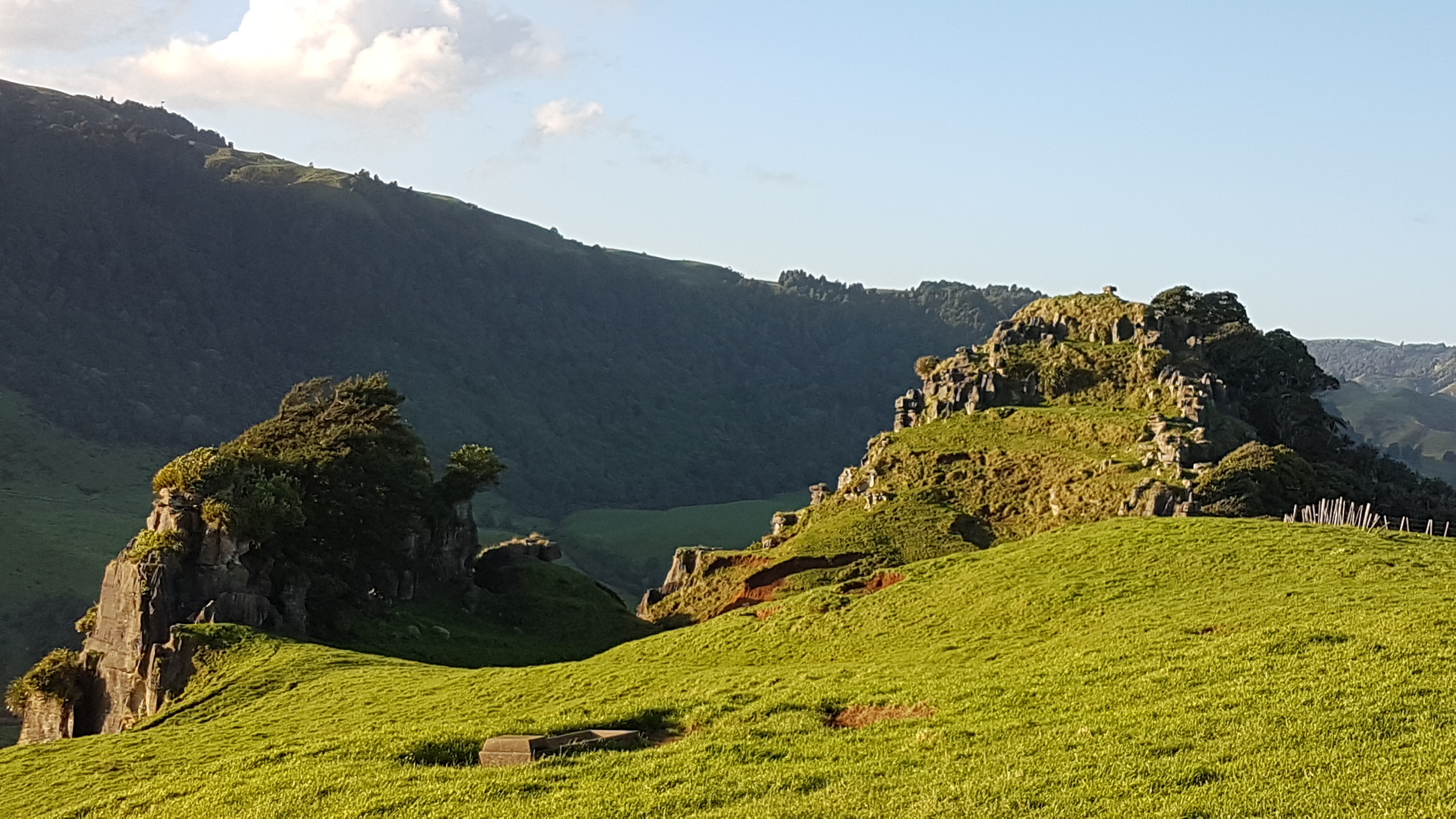
View of Castle Craig Rock from behind

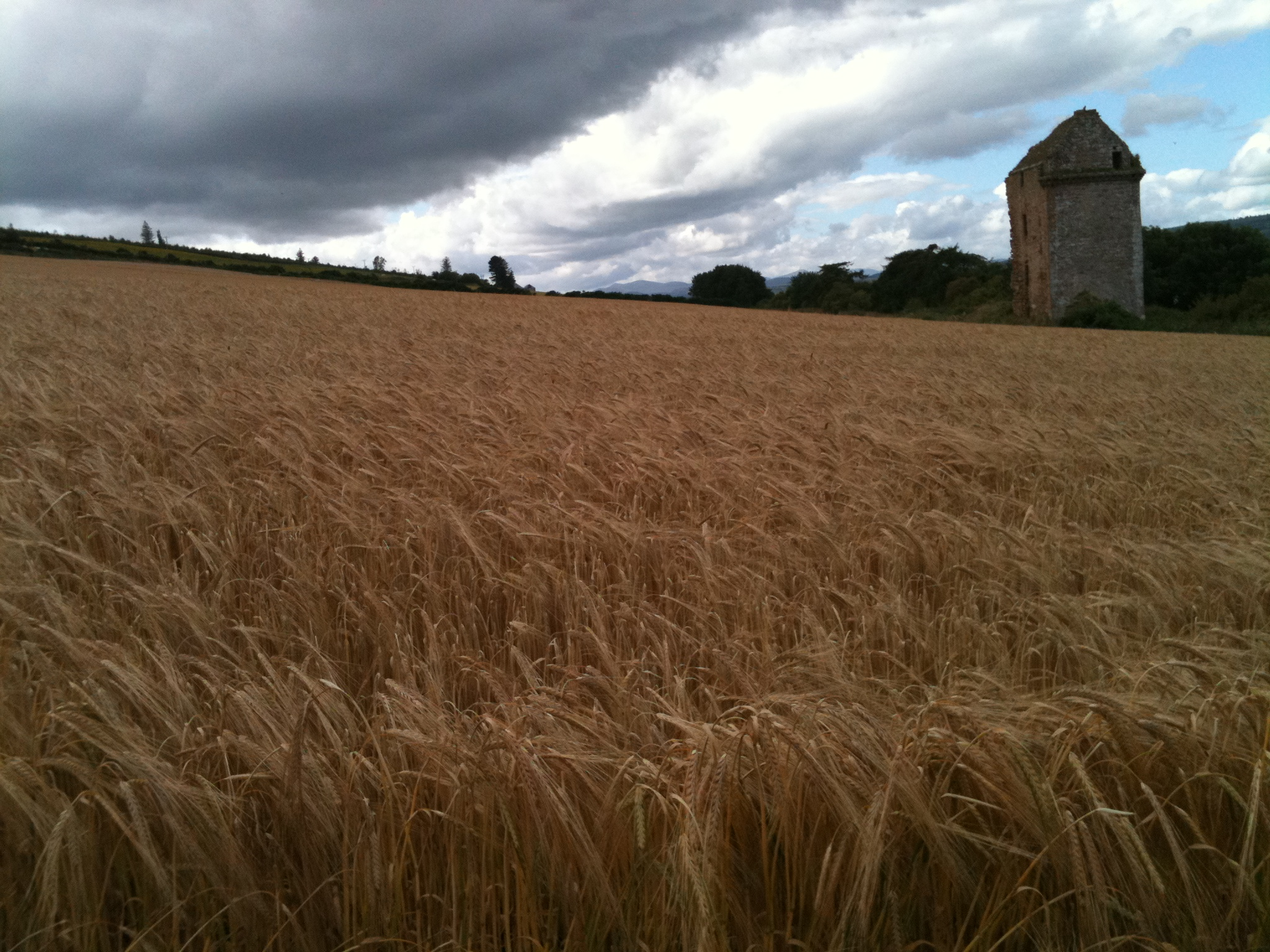
Castlecraig, Black Isle

In the 1920s the owner of Castle Craig Farm, which is where the rock is located, named it Castle Craig Rock because he thought it looked very similar to Castlecraig in Black Isle in northern Scotland.

The rock formation is mentioned in the magazine "New Zealand Journal of Geology and Geophysics 1967 Vol.10 No.4" by PJ Barrett, where he mentions the pebble band in the flaggy limestone. In March, 2019 the surrounding farm hosted a 250 km 4WD off-road race organised by the Waikato Off Road Racing Club.

== See also ==
- Mangapohue Natural Bridge
