= Manu-Tongātea =

Places in the life of Manu-Tongātea.
1 Marokopa
2 Whakatāne
3 Lake Rotoiti
4 Maungatautari

Manu-Tongātea (also known as Mātotoru) was a Māori rangatira (chieftain) of Ngāti Ruanui and Mātaatua descent, who was probably based at Marokopa in Waikato, New Zealand and led a military expedition to the Bay of Plenty area, in around the late sixteenth century.

== Background ==
Manu-Tongātea's mother was a lady of Marokopa called Peha-nui or Pēhā-nui, who was the daughter of Tongātea of Ngāti Ruanui, a descendant of Turi, the captain of the Aotea canoe, and a local lady called Manu. His father was Kai-ahi, from the Whakatāne area, a direct descendant of Toroa, who captained the Mātaatua canoe. Kai-ahi met Peha when travelling with a group and had relations with her before returning to Whakatane, telling her that he would return later.

After Kai-ahi left, Peha-nui gave birth to Manu-Tongātea, whose full name was Te-Tehe-o-Manu-Tongātea ('the circumcised penis of Manu-Tongātea'), referring to the fact that his grandfather had been circumcised.

=== Kai-ahi's attack on Marokopa ===
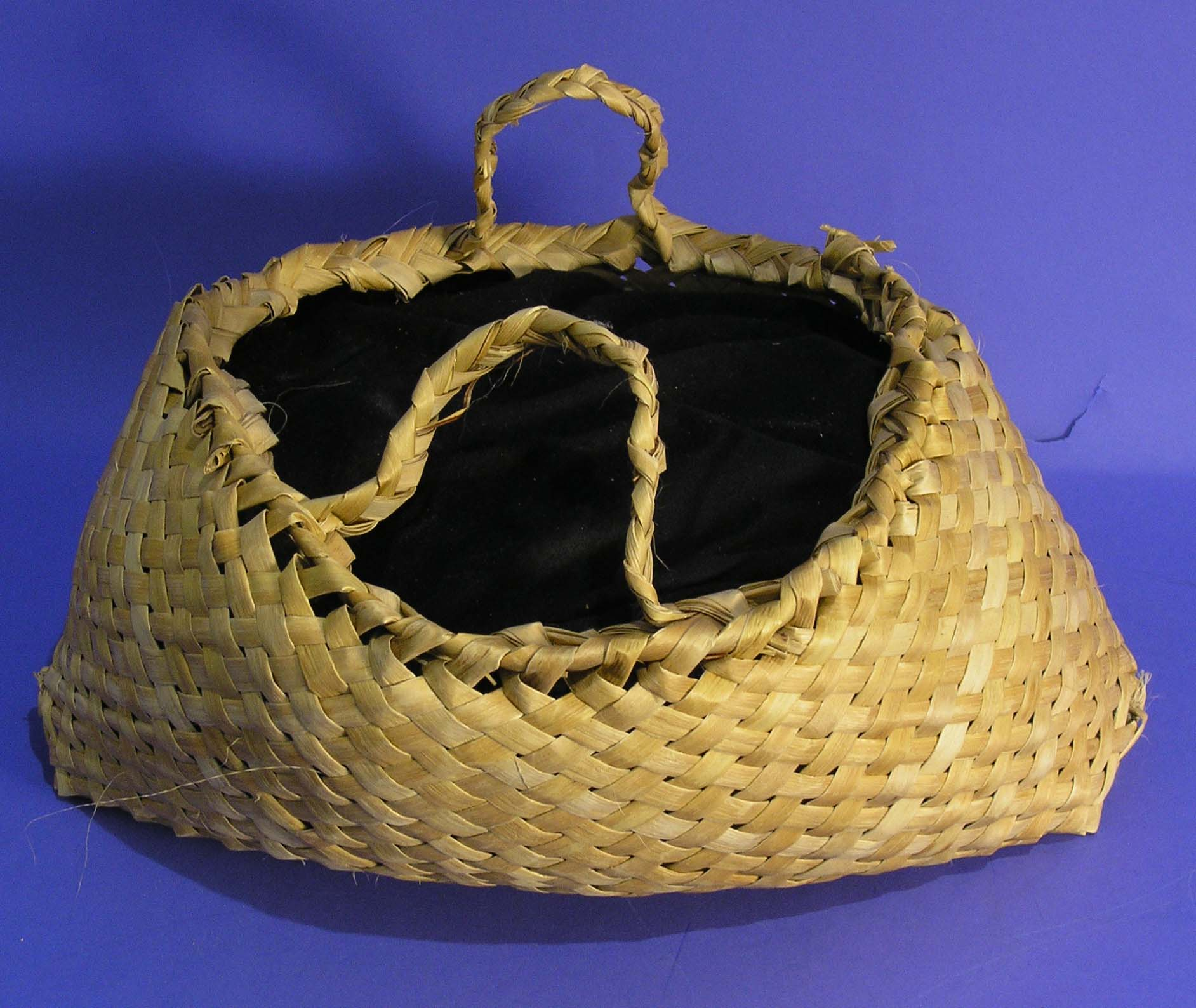
Kete basket, Auckland War Memorial Museum.

After a few years, Kai-ahi returned, leading a raiding party. The locals fled, but Manu-Tongātea, now a young boy, was caught and tied up in a kete basket in order to be eaten in the morning. During the night, he cried out "Manu-Tongātea's skin is chilled by the wind. Peha-nui of Manu, Peha-nui of Kai-ahi," and Kai-ahi realised who he was, released him, and promised that he would get vengeance in the future.

=== Expedition to Rotoiti ===
When Manu-Tongātea was an adult, his mother told him that he could find Kai-ahi's homeland in the east and he raised a war party to go in search of him. When the party arrived at Lake Rotoiti, they found a village that had been attacked by Kai-ahi and the local chief married his daughter Wawara to Manu-Tongātea, although she was already engaged to another man.

Pei Te Hurinui Jones records a mournful waiata which Wawara sang about the arranged marriage, in which she weeps for the loss of her betrothed, describes her new husband as a 'shadow', and concludes:

Give me a cloak-pin! (My skin crawls as if stung with nettles.) My sex is to be a gift to a chief. If so given it might as well be closed up.

— Jones & Biggs 2004, pp. 96–97

After the marriage, Manu-Tongātea's party sacked two villages, but when the war party reached Kai-ahi's village, Manu-Tongātea called the war-party to a halt, walked up to Kai-ahi and made peace with him.

=== Family ===
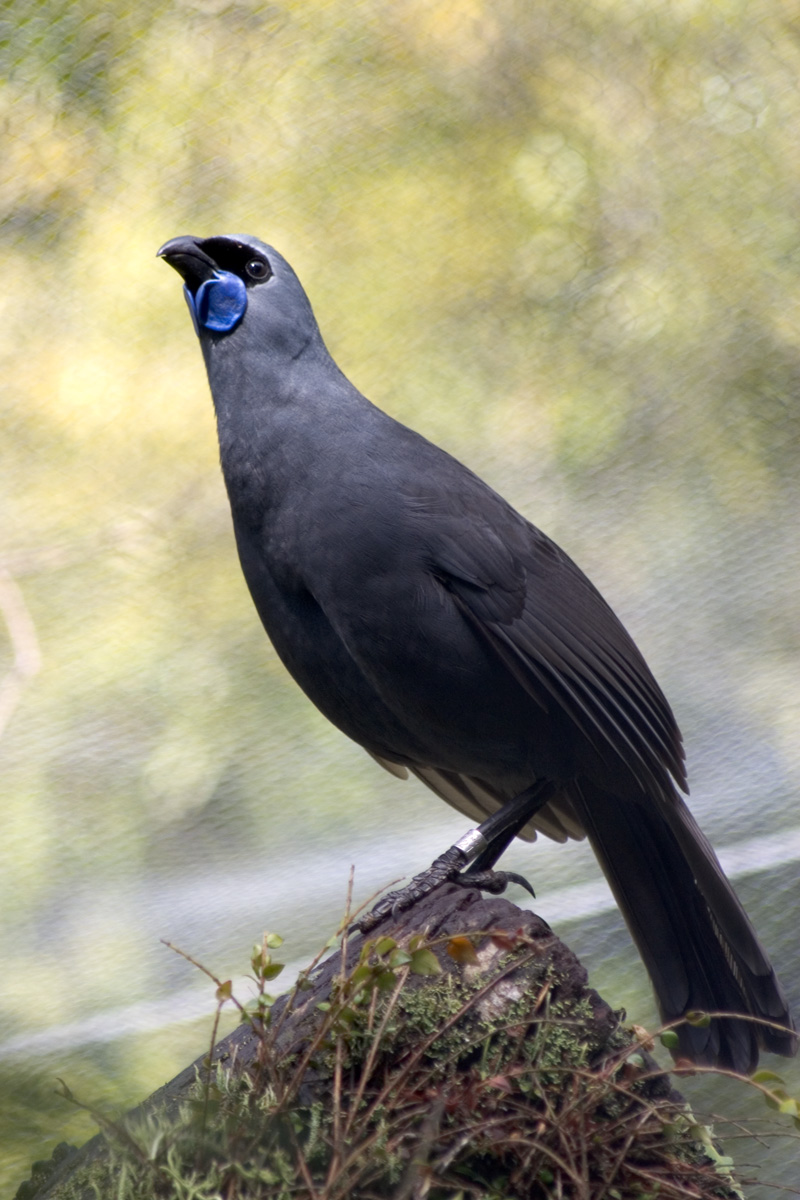
Kōkako bird.

Manu-Tongātea and Wawara had two sons:

- Kōkako, named for the Kōkako birds eaten by Manu-Tongātea's war-party on their journey to Rotoiti.
- Te Matau.

== Sources and variants ==
The story of Manu-Tongātea is recorded by Pei Te Hurinui Jones based on an oral account which he heard from Te Nguha Huirama of Ngāti Tamainu-pō, Ngāti Maniapoto, and Ngāti Te Ata on 24 May 1932. The same story is reported by John White The Ancient History of the Maori. IV: Tainui (1888), but he gives Manu-Tongātea's father as Peha, son of Kai-ahi, and his mother as Peho and in this version Manu-Tongātea is captured and tied up when he goes to visit his father at Whakatane. In a version told to Bruce Biggs by Elsie Turnbull, Manu-Tongātea is instead a man of Maungatautari, who committed adultery with a lady of Marokopa and was tied to a wooden pole, but was released as a result of his cries and left a kokako-feather cloak for his unborn son, who was therefore named Kōkako.

== Bibliography ==
- Jones, Pei Te Hurinui; Biggs, Bruce (2004). Ngā iwi o Tainui : nga koorero tuku iho a nga tuupuna = The traditional history of the Tainui people. Auckland [N.Z.]: Auckland University Press. ISBN 1869403312.
