= Phillips family disappearances =

2021 disappearances in New Zealand

Phillips family
- Disappeared: 9 December 2021; Marokopa, Waikato, New Zealand
- Status: Found on 8 September 2025
- Children: 3
- Father: Tom Phillips

Tom Phillips and his three young children disappeared from the isolated rural Waikato town of Marokopa on 9 December 2021. New Zealand Police believe that the children were taken by their father to a location somewhere in the western Waikato, after a dispute with their mother. Phillips was alleged to have committed a bank robbery in September 2023, but the first sighting of all three children with their father was on 3 October 2024, when they were spotted walking through Marokopa farmland.

In September 2025, Phillips was shot dead by police during an altercation after he was interrupted during a burglary. During the incident a police officer was shot in the head and shoulder, but survived. One of Phillips' children was safely recovered from the scene, and the other two were found later that day. In September 2026, a public inquiry criticised several government agencies' handling of the children's disappearances and their rescue. Prime Minister Christopher Luxon apologised to the Phillips children and their mother on behalf of the New Zealand government.

== Background ==
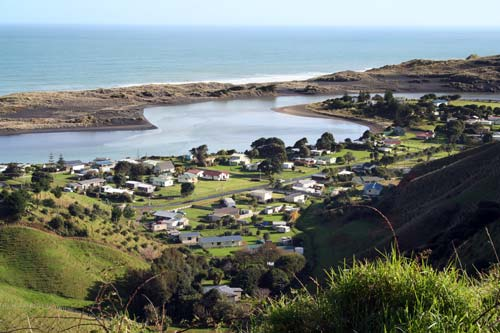
Marokopa seen from above

Before their disappearance, Tom Phillips lived in Ōtorohanga in New Zealand's Waikato region with his three children, who were aged 6, 7 and 9. They also spent much of their time at the family farm in Marokopa. Phillips had been separated from his wife for several years and was homeschooling the children. He had been educated at St Paul's Collegiate School and was an experienced hunter and camper. The Phillips family has farmed in the area for generations.

== First disappearance (September 2021) ==
The Phillips family had last been seen on 11 September 2021, at the family farm in Marokopa. Two days later their Toyota Hilux was found parked below the tideline at nearby Kiritehere beach, being battered by waves. The car keys were under the driver's side mat. Police launched a search operation and a rāhui was placed on the area, disrupting local whitebait fishing. Searchers' initial assessment was that they had most likely been swept out to sea. Despite daily searches of land, sky, and sea, involving a plane, helicopter, jet ski, inflatable rescue boat, and heat-detecting drones, no trace was found. The search base at Marokopa Hall was stood down on 19 September and daily searches were suspended on 24 September.

Phillips and his children were sighted on the morning of 30 September, riding a bike on Mangatoa Road. Police dispatched a plane but were unable to find them. Later in the morning, they "walked through the door" of the family farm. Phillips' sister stated that he had "wanted space to clear his head" and had been living in a tent 15 km (9.3 miles) inland from the beach where his ute had been found. The children were perfectly healthy, described as "bouncy as ever" by their grandmother. A friend of Phillips alleged that he had parked the ute in a car park near where he was camping but that it had been stolen, taken for a joyride and dumped at the beach. With the cost of the search estimated in the hundreds of thousands of dollars, Phillips was charged with wasting police resources, with a court date set for 5 November. This was delayed to 12 January 2022 due to COVID-19 restrictions.

== Second disappearance and robberies (December 2021 – September 2025) ==
Phillips disappeared with the children again on 9 December 2021. Police did not initiate a search, stating that he had notified his family of where he was going and was not in violation of court restrictions. He did not show up to his court date on 12 January and thus an arrest warrant was issued. His lawyer had not heard from him since first informing him of the court date. His ute was discovered parked on Mangatoa Road in late January. Phillips returned home for about an hour at night on 9 February to get supplies, telling his family that the children were okay but not disclosing their location. By that point he had grown a beard. New Zealand Police believed that the children were taken by their father to a location somewhere in the western Waikato, "within Marokopa or the surrounding areas” after a dispute with their mother.

The police, the children's mother, and Ōtorohanga mayor Max Baxter all believed he was receiving additional help to survive.

The older half-sisters of the Phillips children launched a petition in May, calling on the police and relevant government ministries to do more to find them. Police subsequently made a public appeal for information on Ten 7 Aotearoa. There were two reported sightings of the children in May, but these were later dismissed by police. The children's maternal family planned for a search in June, but this was cancelled due to concerns from police. In August, police posited the idea that the Phillips family had changed their names and started a new life elsewhere in the country.

Police declined to offer a reward for the children's return in September 2022, so in October their maternal family began fundraising on Givealittle to offer a $10,000 reward themselves. They managed to raise only around half of that, but said they would supply the remaining reward money themselves.

Phillips allegedly stole a Toyota Hilux ute on 2 August 2023. The stolen ute was later found near Te Anga on 4 August. On August 2, Phillips was also spotted at two Bunnings stores, one in south Hamilton and another in Te Rapa. Police later stated that they believed the purchases made by Phillips suggested he had set up a campsite, as the purchases included headlamps, batteries, seedlings, buckets, and gumboots. The mother of the Phillips children later stated in October 2024 that she had spotted Phillips at the Te Rapa Bunnings, and given chase to his ute.

In September 2023, Phillips was charged with aggravated robbery, including unlawful possession of a firearm, after allegedly robbing a bank and shooting at a supermarket worker in Te Kūiti in May 2023. The offender was photographed with an unidentified accomplice, believed to be one of his children.

A NZ$80,000 reward was offered by the police in June 2024 for information that led to the location and safe return of the children. They also offered legal immunity to anyone assisting the Phillips' if they came forward. The police received 50 tips "deemed worthy of consideration". On the eldest child's eleventh birthday, the children's mother released a video pleading for the public to assist the police in their search.

On 3 October 2024, Phillips and the three children were spotted walking through Marokopa farmland by a pair of pig hunters, who filmed the encounter. The pair did not take the interaction further due to Phillips possessing a gun, and instead called the police. After a three-day search, including the use of a military helicopter, "nothing further of significance" was found, according to police.

On 27 August 2025, New Zealand police released CCTV footage of what appeared to be Phillips and one of his children attempting a break-in of a store in Piopio. On 29 August, Detective Senior Sergeant Andy Saunders said that Police had ruled out involving elite military forces such as the New Zealand Special Air Service (NZSAS) in the search for Phillips and his children to avoid the risk of the children being harmed during a confrontation with Phillips. In addition, Prime Minister Christopher Luxon and other cabinet ministers described the question of NZSAS involvement as an operational matter for the Police to decide. On 10 November, The New Zealand Herald reported that the New Zealand Defence Force had acknowledged that four NZSAS personnel assisted Police during the hunt for Phillips and his children.

== Ram raid in Piopio and confrontation with the police ==
On 8 September 2025, Phillips was shot dead by police. Acting Deputy Police Commissioner Jill Rogers confirmed the timeline of events: In the early hours of the morning, an alarm was triggered at a PGG Wrightson rural supply store in Piopio. The burglars—Phillips and one of his children—fled the town on a quad bike. The quad bike was travelling along Te Anga Road, 30 km (19 mi) north of Piopio, when spikes were laid and the quad bike hit the spikes. A constable came to find the incapacitated bike, and Phillips fired at the officer with a high-powered rifle as the officer was getting out of his car. The constable was hit multiple times, resulting in injuries to his eye, before he fell to the ground and took cover. A second police vehicle then approached the scene and engaged Phillips, killing him. Multiple firearms were found on or around the quad bike. The injured constable was airlifted to Waikato Hospital to undergo surgery and survived his injuries.

By the evening of 8 September, police had found the two remaining children safe and well at a remote campsite. According to The New Zealand Herald, one of the children at the camp had been armed with a rifle as police approached, and negotiators from the Police Special Tactics Group worked to convince them to drop it. The Herald also confirmed that the child who had been travelling with the late Phillips had helped the police negotiators to convince the other children to come with them. Rogers confirmed that 50 personnel took part in the search for the two children and that the camp site would be forensically examined for the next two days. The campsite was in deep bush approximately 2 kilometres (1.2 mi) from where Phillips was shot. The campsite had been occupied for some time and included some "structures". Police described the campsite as "grim, dimly lit, and surrounded by dense bush". Images of the campsite were released by police.

The children's mother released a statement expressing relief that her three children had been found safely and expressing aroha for the wounded police officer. On 10 September, Police Commissioner Richard Chambers confirmed that the children would remain in the care of Oranga Tamariki (the Ministry for Children) and that police would not question them while they continued their search for further campsites and Phillips' accomplices. Police also carried out a postmortem of Phillips and returned his body to his family on 11 September. Detective inspector Daryl Smith also confirmed that police were examining Phillips' campsites in the Waikato region, and were expected to finish by 12 September.

In early October, Phillips' parents, Neville and Julia Phillips, publicly apologised for their son's actions in a letter to the King Country News. By 24 October, Police had found two more of Phillip's hidden campsites to the north and east of Marokopa, in addition to the makeshift camp near Te Anga Road. Detective Superintendent Ross McKay stated that the Police investigation confirmed that Phillips and his children frequently travelled between these makeshift camps to avoid detection.

=== Media coverage ===
The death of Phillips attracted significant international media coverage from several media outlets including ABC News, CNN and BBC News. The family of Phillips, including his sister Rozzi Phillips and the children's mother, have objected to a documentary on the Phillips family disappearance, being produced by Dame Julie Christie. On 10 September 2025, the police's executive director media and communications Claire Trevett confirmed that a film crew from NHNZ had accompanied the police's "Operation Curly" team for much of 2025. Documentary film-maker Leanne Pooley expressed concern that the documentary film could re-traumatise the children.

On 11 September, Wellington High Court Justice Cull granted an urgent injunction sought by the Phillips family lawyer Linda Clark to prevent the media from publishing certain details of the police investigation into Phillips and his family. That same day, Police Commissioner Chambers confirmed the police was considering taking legal action against media company Stuff for publishing police audio communications, which can be considered a breach of Section 133A of the Radiocommunications Act 1989. Stuff editor-in-chief Keith Lynch defended the company's usage of the police audio, arguing that Phillips' death was of public interest and importance.

On 18 September, lawyers representing several media outlets including Radio New Zealand unsuccessfully argued against the court injunction at the Wellington High Court. Justice Cull confirmed the court injunction would continue until a further court order. In early October 2025, Justice Gary Collin of the Family Court in Hamilton granted a second interim injunction preventing anyone from publishing a documentary, book or film that referred to the children, citing the need to protect their right to privacy. On 17 October, Justice Cull extended the court injunction against the media reporting details related to the Police investigation into Phillips. That same day, the children's mother, represented by lawyer Michael Bott, became a party to the injunction proceedings originally lodged by Phillip's mother, Julia Phillips.

In mid December 2025, RNZ reported that the producer of the upcoming documentary, The Marokopa Project, agreed the police could preview and edit the documentary prior to its expected release in 2027. In return, filmmakers got exclusive access to view evidence, attend and record police briefings, meetings and operations over the course of 2025. The documentary is expected to focus on Operation Curly and associated operations, interviews with key Police personnel, footage of police visits to the Marokopa community and local stakeholders, various footage and recordings held by Police including drone footage, and recordings or transcripts of interviews.

On 23 January 2026, RNZ reported that a member of the Police's media team had told the NHNZ documentary film crew about Phillip's death an hour before his family was notified. Police subsequently apologised to Phillip's family and said the decision was ill-advised. On 20 November 2026, a review led by Detective Inspector Shaun Vickers and media consultant Gavin Ellis found that Julie Christie and a cameraman had been given access to the campsite where the Phillips children were found before Police had completed a forensic examination of the site. The duo had also spent 30 minutes at the site of Phillip's death following the removal of his body but prior to a forensic examination. Vickers and Ellis' review concluded that the Police's agreement with The Marokopa Project film crew "did not automatically compromise investigative integrity, but it created conditions where integrity required active protection".

=== Public inquiry ===
On 27 November 2025, Attorney-General Judith Collins confirmed that the government would establish a public inquiry led by Justice Simon Moore KC to investigate whether government agencies took all steps to ensure the safety and welfare of the three Phillips children. Since 2018, the children have been the subject of proceedings in the Family Court, and in August 2023, the children were placed in the guardianship of the Family Court. The inquiry was held in private to safeguard the children's wellbeing. The public inquiry's final report was expected to be released by 21 July 2026, but was later extended by one month.

The public inquiry's final report was released on 15 September 2026 by the Department of Internal Affairs. On 16 September, Prime Minister Christopher Luxon apologized on behalf of the New Zealand Government to the Phillips children and their mother after a Moore's inquiry identified serious failures by several government agencies including the Police, Oranga Tamariki, New Zealand Defence Force and the Ministry of Education in preventing their kidnapping at the hands of their father and rescuing the children.

=== Police investigation into alleged helpers ===
In May 2026, Police announced that they were declining to lay charges against Phillips's alleged helpers due to insufficient evidence, and ending their investigation named Operation Cranmere.

== See also ==
- List of solved missing person cases (2020s)
