= Tongatea =

Tongatea may refer to:

- Tongātea, sixteenth-century Māori chieftain of Ngāti Ruanui from southern Taranaki, New Zealand
- Tongatea, wife of Ngaru in the mythology of Mangaia of the Cook Islands

== See also ==
- Manu-Tongātea
