= Te Anga =

- Locality
- Interactive map of Te Anga
- Country: New Zealand
- Region: Waikato region
- District: Waitomo District
- Ward: Waitomo Rural Ward
- Electorates: Taranaki-King Country; Te Tai Hauāuru (Māori)

Government
  - Territorial Authority: Waitomo District Council
  - Regional council: Waikato Regional Council
  - Mayor of Waitomo: John Robertson
  - Taranaki-King Country MP: Barbara Kuriger
  - Hauraki-Waikato MP: Hana-Rawhiti Maipi-Clarke

Area
  - Territorial: 262.30 km^{2} (101.27 sq mi)

Population (2023 census)
  - Territorial: 123
  - Density: 0.469/km^{2} (1.21/sq mi)
- Time zone: UTC+12 (NZST)
  - Summer (DST): UTC+13 (NZDT)

Te Anga is a rural community in the Waitomo District and Waikato region of New Zealand's North Island.

Marokopa River runs through the area. The river is not safe to swim in due to high rates of E. coli, but farmers have put in plans to reduce water pollution.

The area transitioned from sheep farming to more intensive dairy farming at the turn of the century.

The local landscape consists of limestones, calcareous mudstones and sandstones, with small areas of basal conglomerates and coal measures.

Marokopa Falls and Mangapohue Natural Bridge are close to Te Anga.

== Demographics ==
Te Anga locality, including Piripiri and Awamarino, covers 262.30 km^{2} (101.27 sq mi). It is part of the larger Herangi statistical area.

Historical population
Year	Pop.	±% p.a.
2013	114	—
2018	123	+1.53%
2023	123	+0.00%

Te Anga locality had a population of 123 in the 2023 New Zealand census, unchanged since the 2018 census, and an increase of 9 people (7.9%) since the 2013 census. There were 63 males and 63 females in 45 dwellings. The median age was 43.7 years (compared with 38.1 years nationally). There were 24 people (19.5%) aged under 15 years, 21 (17.1%) aged 15 to 29, 54 (43.9%) aged 30 to 64, and 24 (19.5%) aged 65 or older.

People could identify as more than one ethnicity. The results were 82.9% European (Pākehā), 22.0% Māori, 2.4% Pasifika, 2.4% Asian, and 4.9% other, which includes people giving their ethnicity as "New Zealander". English was spoken by 97.6%, Māori by 9.8%, and other languages by 4.9%. No language could be spoken by 2.4% (e.g. too young to talk). The percentage of people born overseas was 14.6, compared with 28.8% nationally.

The sole religious affiliation given was 41.5% Christian. People who answered that they had no religion were 53.7%, and 2.4% of people did not answer the census question.

Of those at least 15 years old, 18 (18.2%) people had a bachelor's or higher degree, 54 (54.5%) had a post-high school certificate or diploma, and 27 (27.3%) people exclusively held high school qualifications. The median income was $35,000, compared with $41,500 nationally. 3 people (3.0%) earned over $100,000 compared to 12.1% nationally. The employment status of those at least 15 was 54 (54.5%) full-time and 12 (12.1%) part-time.

== Education ==
Piripiri School is a co-educational state primary school, with a roll of 13 as of July 2026. The school opened in 1927. Awamarino School opened in 1923 and merged with Piripiri School by 1977.
