= Mangapohue Natural Bridge =

Coordinates: 38.26028°S 174.900556°E

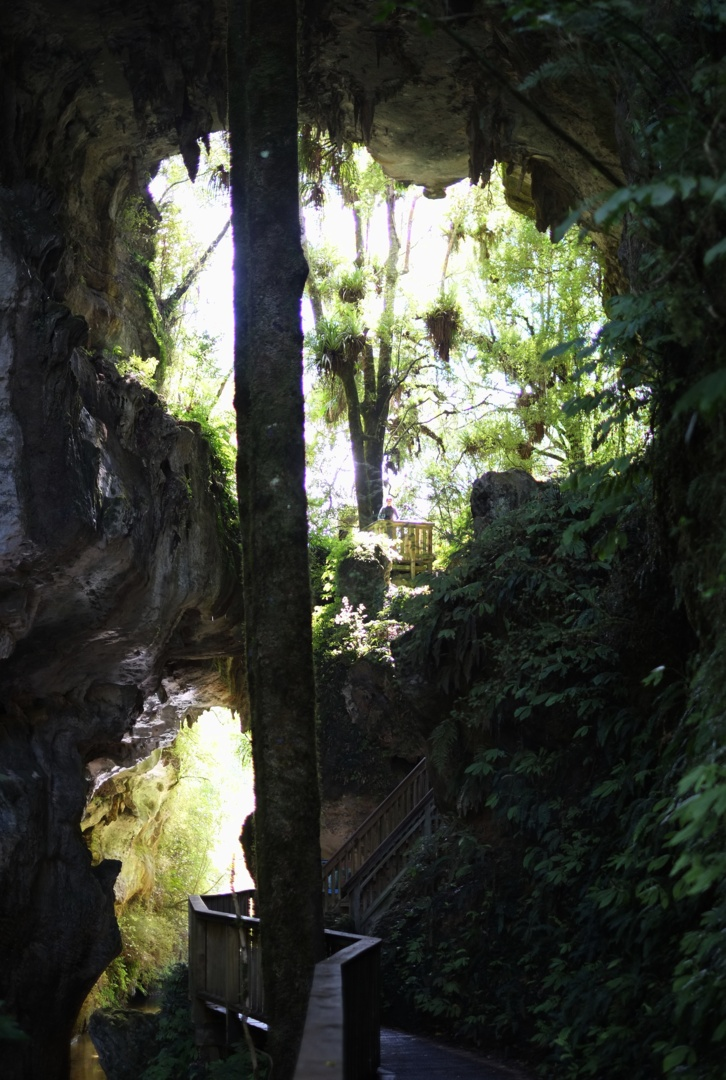
Double rock arches at Mangapohue Natural Bridge

The Mangapohue Natural Bridge consists of two rock arches formed by the Mangapohue Stream in the Marokopa River valley near Waitomo, New Zealand.

The 17 m high limestone arches are a remnant of an ancient cave system. The smaller lower rock arch spans the Mangapohue Stream and cannot be walked through, while the larger upper arch is situated straight above the lower arch and contains a platform to view the stalactites on the upper arch's ceiling.

The arches can be reached by the sealed Te Anga Road from State Highway 3 approximately 25 km west of the Waitomo Caves. From the carpark, the wheelchair-friendly walk takes 5 minutes to reach the natural bridge. The walk leads through a scenic limestone gorge, crossing the stream once on a timber bridge, and ending at a viewing platform below the rock arches. Steps lead to a further viewing platform between the lower and upper arch. A track also continues some 15 minutes further over farmland.
