= Castlecraig =

16th-century fortification in northern Scotland

Coordinates: 57.6434°N 4.2934°W

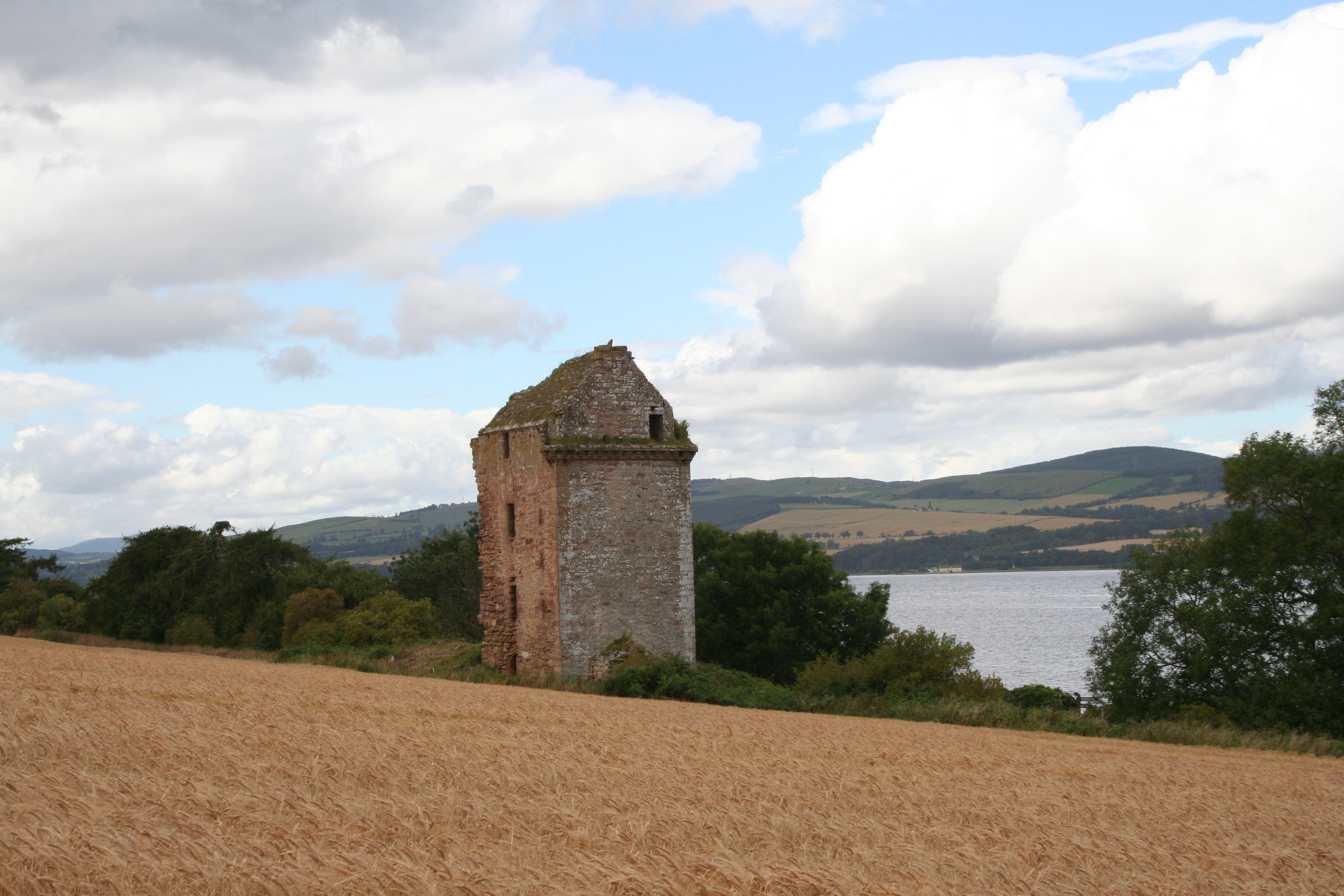
Castlecraig, Black Isle

Castlecraig, also known as Craig Castle and Castle Craig, is a 16th-century fortification located on the north shore of the Black Isle in northern Scotland. It is on the south coast of the Cromarty Firth, 5 kilometres (3.1 mi) north-east of Culbokie and 19 kilometres (12 mi) north of the city of Inverness. The castle is protected as a scheduled monument.

Castlecraig is a ruined tower house. The north-east wing still stands and remains roofed, although another wing to the north-west has collapsed. The tower may have been used as a residence by the post-Reformation Bishops of Ross. Donald Monro, Dean of the Isles, may have lived at Castlecraig in the 1560s.

The New Zealand geologic formation of Castle Craig Rock is named for its similar appearance to Castlecraig.

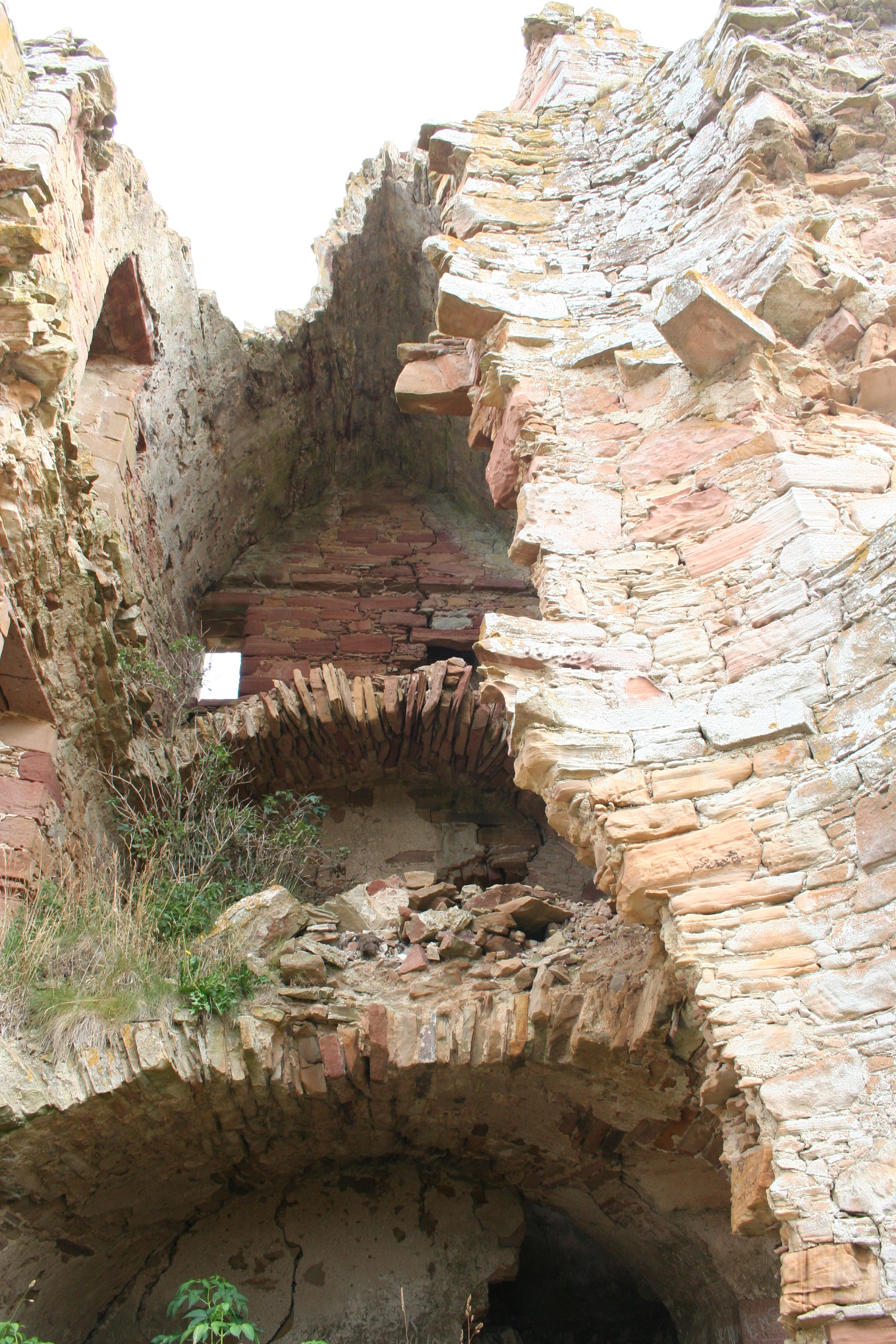
Interior view showing levels

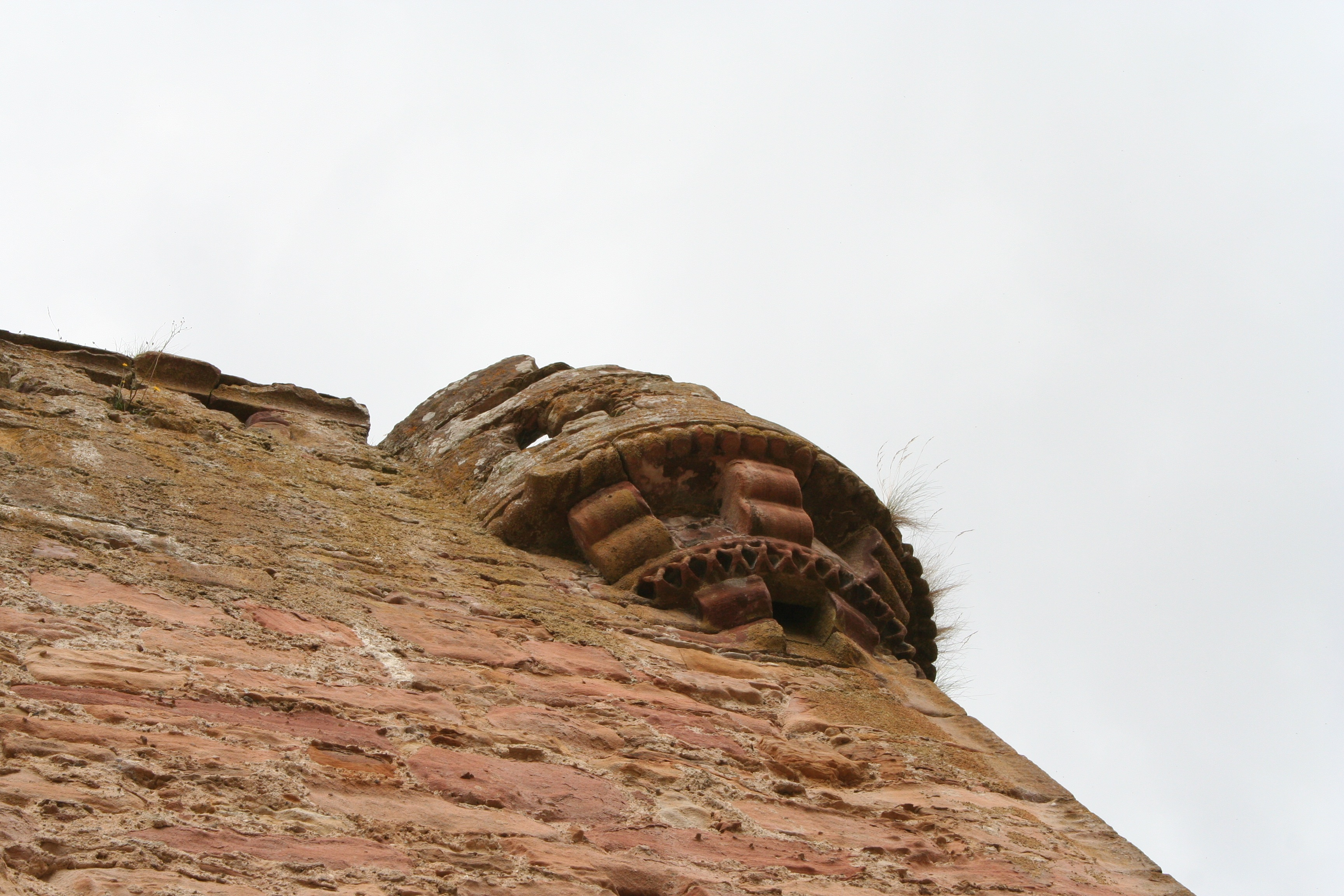
Detail of corner tower
