= Marokopa =

Community in Waikato Region, New Zealand

- Rural settlement
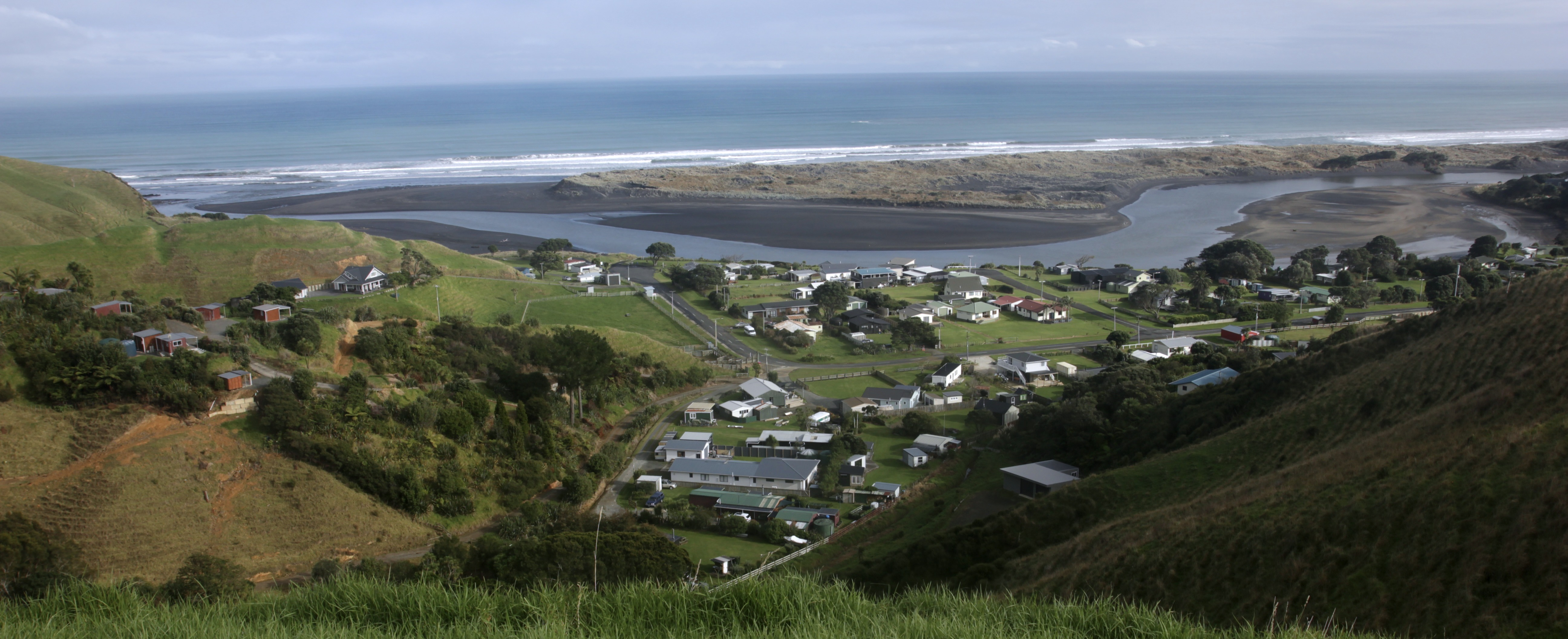
- A view of Marokopa from Mangatoa Road
- Interactive map of Marokopa
- Coordinates: 38.305°S 174.721°E
- Country: New Zealand
- Region: Waikato region
- District: Waitomo District
- Ward: Waitomo Rural Ward
- Electorates: Taranaki-King Country; Te Tai Hauāuru (Māori)

Government
  - Territorial Authority: Waitomo District Council
  - Regional council: Waikato Regional Council
  - Mayor of Waitomo: John Robertson
  - Taranaki-King Country MP: Barbara Kuriger
  - Hauraki-Waikato MP: Hana-Rawhiti Maipi-Clarke

Area
  - Territorial: 1.67 km^{2} (0.64 sq mi)

Population (June 2025)
  - Territorial: 40
  - Density: 24/km^{2} (62/sq mi)
- Time zone: UTC+12 (NZST)
  - Summer (DST): UTC+13 (NZDT)

Marokopa is a rural community in Waitomo District and Waikato region of New Zealand. It is located close to the coast between Awakino and Kawhia Harbour. The meshblock includes the coastal township of Marokopa, at the mouth of the Marokopa River, and the south side of the small village of Awamarino, about 10 km (6.2 mi) upstream.

The area was settled by forestry workers in the 19th century. It has been predominantly a farming locale since the early 20th century. In 1911 a large dairy factory was built, which mainly made butter which was shipped to Auckland. The Awamarino factory was enlarged in 1932, but closed in 1937. A telephone link to Te Kūiti was completed in 1914 and a service car ran on Tuesdays and Fridays from 1920. The town also had a post office, a flaxmill and a school (1908-1982). The nearest school is now Piripiri, 20 km (12 mi) upstream. There is a campground.

== Demographics ==
Statistics New Zealand describes Marokopa as a rural settlement, which covers 1.67 km^{2} (0.64 sq mi). It had an estimated population of 40 as of June 2025, with a population density of 24 people per km^{2}. The settlement is part of the larger Herangi statistical area.

Historical population
Year	Pop.	±% p.a.
2013	24	—
2018	24	+0.00%
2023	42	+11.84%

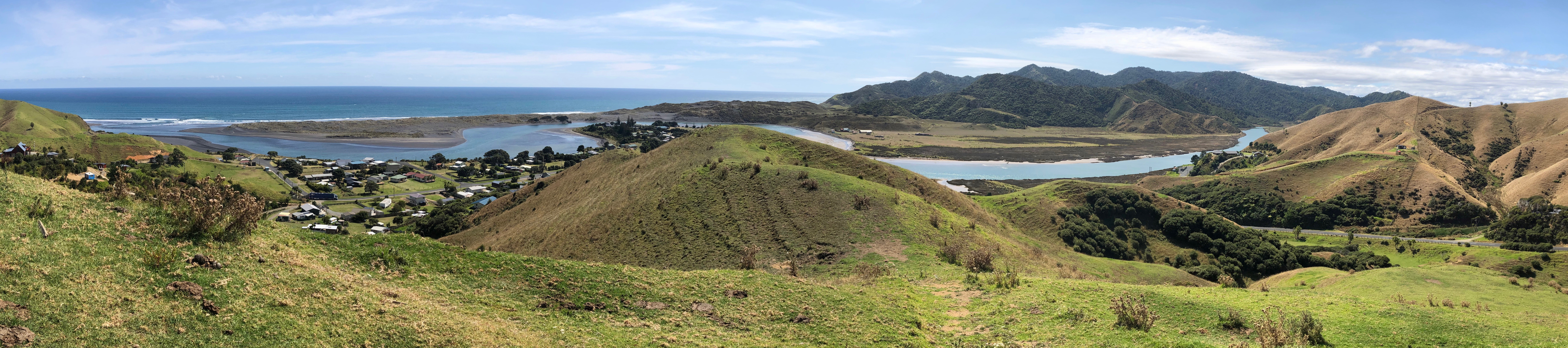
Marokopa from Mangatoa Rd, showing the mouth of the Marokopa River, the marae on the north bank and 418m Te Iringa beyond

Marokopa had a population of 42 in the 2023 New Zealand census, an increase of 18 people (75.0%) since the 2018 census, and an increase of 18 people (75.0%) since the 2013 census. There were 18 males and 21 females in 18 dwellings. The median age was 63.8 years (compared with 38.1 years nationally). There were 3 people (7.1%) aged under 15 years, none aged 15 to 29, 18 (42.9%) aged 30 to 64, and 21 (50.0%) aged 65 or older.

People could identify as more than one ethnicity. The results were 78.6% European (Pākehā), and 28.6% Māori. English was spoken by 100.0%, Māori by 7.1%, and other languages by 7.1%. The percentage of people born overseas was 7.1, compared with 28.8% nationally.

The sole religious affiliation given was 42.9% Christian. People who answered that they had no religion were 42.9%, and 7.1% of people did not answer the census question.

Of those at least 15 years old, 21 (53.8%) had a post-high school certificate or diploma, and 15 (38.5%) people exclusively held high school qualifications. The median income was $23,600, compared with $41,500 nationally. 3 people (7.7%) earned over $100,000 compared to 12.1% nationally. The employment status of those at least 15 was 6 (15.4%) full-time and 6 (15.4%) part-time.

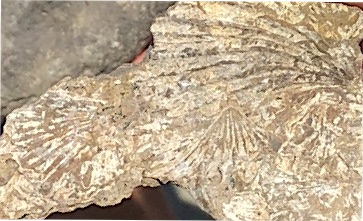
Monotis fossil shells – Kiritehere beach

== Geology ==
The coast between Marokopa and Kiritehere is accessible at low tide. Along the few kilometres, a succession of Late Triassic and Jurassic rocks are exposed. They are part of the western limb of the Kawhia Syncline, which extends north to the Hakarimatas and have been described as the best Triassic sequence in the North Island. The rocks are youngest at Marokopa (Aratauran) and oldest to the south of Kiritehere (Otapirian), where there is a large bed of monotis, one of the index fossils.

== Marae ==
Marokopa Marae and Miromiro i te Pō meeting house are a meeting ground for the local Ngāti Maniapoto hapū of Ngāti Kinohaku, Te Kanawa and Peehi.

== See also ==
- Phillips family disappearances
