= John White (ethnographer) =

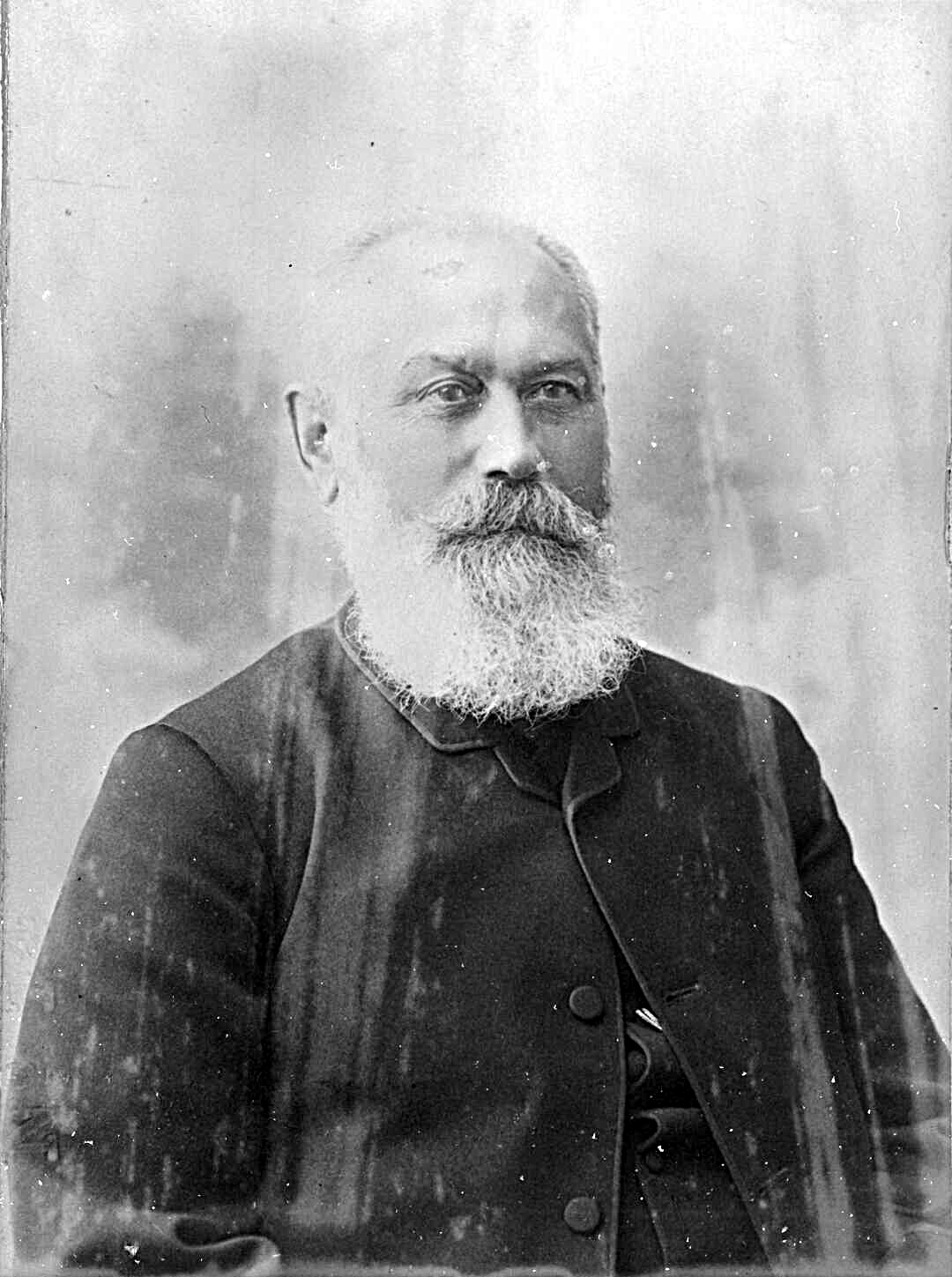
- John White
- Born: 3 January 1826; Cockfield, County Durham, England
- Died: 13 January 1891 (aged 65); Auckland, New Zealand
- Known for: The Ancient History of the Maori (1889)

John White (3 January 1826 – 13 January 1891) was an English public servant and ethnographer in New Zealand, known for his work on the history and traditions of the Māori people.

== Life ==
John White was born in Durham, England, to Francis White, a blacksmith, and his wife Jane Angus. The family emigrated from England in 1834, bound for New Zealand, via Sydney. Francis White's brother William White was a Wesleyan missionary in the Hokianga and may have encouraged them to emigrate. They arrived in New Zealand in 1835 and settled in the Hokianga. The family moved to Auckland in 1851. He married Mary Elizabeth Bagnall in 1854.

During his early life in the Hokianga, White had almost daily contact with Māori and took an interest in their culture, collecting hundreds of songs, incantations, history and traditions. When his family moved to Auckland, he became a secretary and interpreter for the governor, George Grey. From 1852 he was an official interpreter, helping in negotiations for access to the Coromandel goldfields, and continued as an assistant gold commissioner. He joined Donald McLean's Land Purchase Department in 1854, and travelled the North Island purchasing Māori land. From 1862 to 1865 he was a magistrate for the Whanganui region. From 1865 to 1867 he again worked in government land purchasing. Then followed several years working privately as a land agent and interpreter. In 1874 this work took him to Napier, where he then edited Te Wananga, a Māori newspaper published by Hēnare Tomoana, for several years.

He died during a visit to Auckland on 13 January 1891.

== Works ==
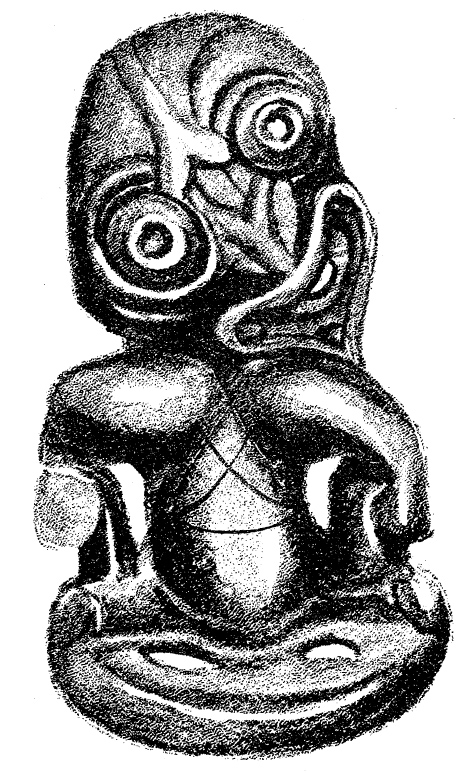
Sketch of a hei-tiki, from John White, ''The Ancient History of the Maori

White was employed by the government of New Zealand to compile a complete history of the Māori traditions; he had completed six volumes at the time of his death. They appeared in 1889 with the title: The Ancient History of the Māori, his Mythology and Traditions (Wellington). He was also author of a novelette, entitled: Te Rou, Or, The Māori at Home (1874).

== Notes ==
Attribution

This article incorporates text from a publication now in the public domain: Lee, Sidney, ed. (1900). "White, John (1826-1891)". Dictionary of National Biography. Vol. 61. London: Smith, Elder & Co.
