= Marokopa River =

Coordinates: 38.307235°S 174.715666°E

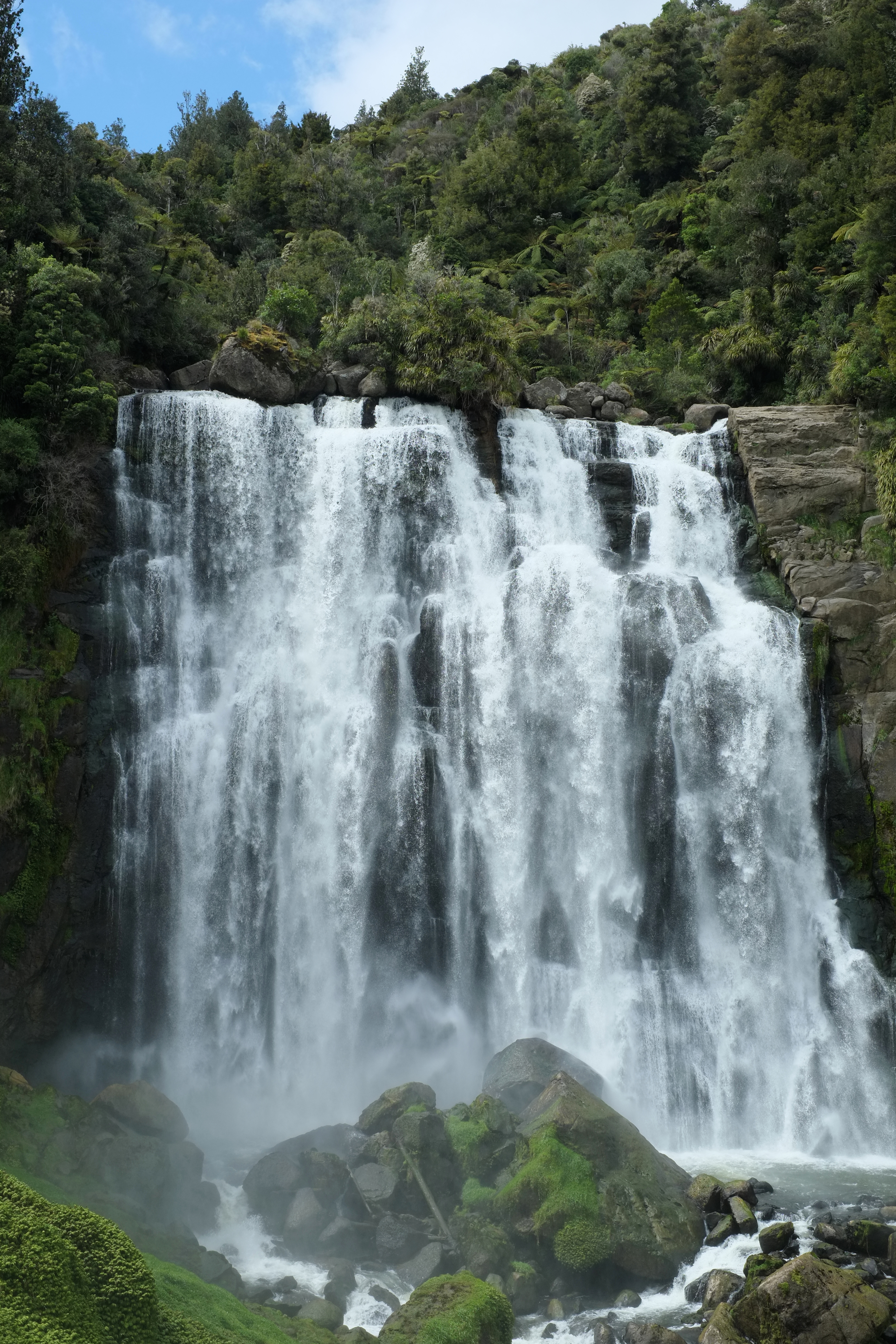
- Marokopa River at Marokopa Falls

Location
- Country: New Zealand
- Region: Waikato Region

Physical characteristics
- Source
  - location: Waitomo District
- Mouth
  - location: Tasman Sea
  - elevation: 0 m (0 ft)
- Length: 40.5 km (25.2 mi)

The Marokopa River is a river of the Waikato Region of New Zealand. It flows west to join the Tasman Sea at Marokopa. The main part of the river is 40.5 km (25.2 mi) long, with about 533 km (331 mi) of tributaries. The catchment is some 364 km^{2} (141 sq mi).

Near Te Anga, the river flows over the picturesque Marokopa Falls. The settlements of Awamarino and Marokopa are located on the river's banks.

Trout were introduced about 1910. The lower river is polluted.

== See also ==
- List of rivers of New Zealand
