= State Highway 39 (New Zealand) =

Road in New Zealand

State Highway 39

Route information
- Maintained by NZ Transport Agency Waka Kotahi
- Length: 65.5 km (40.7 mi)

Major junctions
- North end: SH 1C (Mangaharakeke Drive) at Te Rapa
- SH 23 (Whatawhata Road) at Whatawhata; SH 31 west (Kawhia Road) at Tihiroa
- South end: SH 3 (Maniapoto Street) at Ōtorohanga

Location
- Country: New Zealand
- Primary destinations: Te Kowhai, Whatawhata, Pirongia

Highway system
- New Zealand state highways; Motorways and expressways; List
← SH 38	→ SH 40

State Highway 39 (SH 39) is a New Zealand state highway that forms a western bypass of the city of Hamilton. Gazetted in 1999, it is a generally quicker route to get between Auckland and New Plymouth as well as connecting to the Waitomo Caves, just south of the SH 39 southern terminus. The southernmost 14 km section has a concurrency with SH 31, as this highway has existed for much longer (SH 31 continues west to Kawhia).

== Route ==
SH 39 begins at SH 1C on the Te Rapa section of the Waikato Expressway at Koura Drive, just north of the city of Hamilton. It shifts south briefly before reaching a roundabout junction where it follows Te Kowhai Road westbound, eventually changing to Limmer Road. At the intersection of Horotiu Road SH 39 veers south (the northbound road formed the previous SH 39 route) until the intersection with SH 23 at Whatawhata. It shares a brief concurrency, turning left into SH 23, then immediately right back onto SH 39 southbound. Following Kakaramea Road, the highway passed through Ngāhinapōuri then the township of Pirongia. After Pironga the state highway intersects SH 31 to Kawhia. For the final 14 km the road is jointly designated SH 31 and SH 39 before terminating in the town of Ōtorohanga with SH 3.

SH 39 is classified as an 'arterial' highway under the One Network Road Classification.

The traffic flow records indicate that through traffic forms about half the flow, with traffic from Hamilton via SH 23 adding to the flow through Whatawhata and via Temple View and Tuhikaramea Rd adding to the flow through Ngāhinapōuri and from Kawhia adding a little to the flow at the southern end of SH 39.

Average annual daily traffic
Location	2011	2012	2013	2014	2015	% Heavy vehicles
east of Te Kowhai			1572	3243	3761	13
north of Whatawhata					5062	15
north of Tuhikaramea Rd	3133	3152	3020	2918	3230	19
Ngāhinapōuri	5503	5413	5430	5500	5666	15
Puketotara	3166	3202	3243	3269	3545	17
before SH 31 Intersection	2456	2503	2666	2589	2801	20
after SH 31 Intersection	2576	2714	2755	2781	2929	20

== Major intersections ==
Territorial authority	Location	km	mi	Destinations	Notes
Waikato District	Burbush	0	0.0	SH 1C north – Auckland; SH 1C south – Hamilton	SH 39 begins
Waikato District	Whatawhata			SH 23 west – Raglan	Staggered T-junction
Waikato District	Whatawhata			SH 23 east – Hamilton	Staggered T-junction
Waipa District	Tihiroa			SH 31 west – Kawhia	SH 39/SH 31 concurrency begins
Ōtorohanga District	Ōtorohanga			SH 3 north – Hamilton; SH 3 south	SH 39/SH 31 concurrency ends
Concurrency terminus

== Route changes ==
SH 39's northern stop has changed. In 2013 after the completion of the Waikato Expressway, Ngāruawāhia Section, SH 1 used to travel through Ngāruawāhia and Te Kowhai further north than currently. After the expressway was completed, the Waikato Expressway become the new SH 1 as it is a faster route. SH 39 was diverted away from Ngāruawāhia to its current terminus at Te Rapa. The current route was temporarily designated SH 39A whilst it was being upgraded to highway status and in June 2014 this section become SH 39 and the old section revoked. In July 2022, upon opening of the Hamilton section of the Waikato Expressway, SH 1 moved from its location via Mangaharakeke Drive onto the expressway. The old designation of SH 1 through Hamilton was renumbered SH 1C.

== History ==
In 1936/7 the road was declared a main highway under the Main Highways Act 1922 from Horotiu/Ngāruawāhia to Te Rore via Whatawhata and improvements made. At that time, AADT south of Whatawhata was 102, and on 1970, SH39 was straightened and widened.

=== Floods ===
The road runs close to the Waipā River for most of its length. Until the 1930s improvements, floods closed the road in 1904, 1907 and 1926.

=== Buses ===
The only bus now using SH 39 is a very short section of the Raglan-Hamilton route. A bus route linked Pirongia, Whatawhata and Hamilton from 1926. In 1932 Lewis Hodgson took over and it was still running in 1942.

== See also ==
- List of New Zealand state highways
