= Te Rore =

- Locality
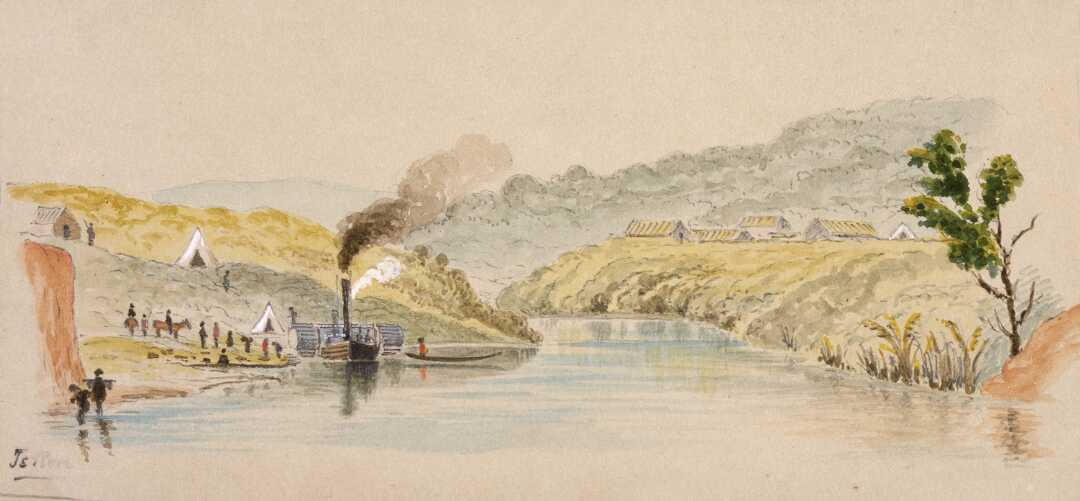
- Paddle steamer at Te Rore in 1864
- Interactive map of Te Rore
- Location within New Zealand
- Coordinates: 37°56′29″S 175°11′35″E
- Country: New Zealand
- Region: Waikato region
- District: Waipā District
- Elevation: 30 m (98 ft)

Population (2018 census)
  - Territorial: 144
- Time zone: UTC+12 (NZST)
  - Summer (DST): UTC+13 (NZDT)

Te Rore was in the 1850s an important transhipment point on New Zealand's Waipā River, between the agriculture of the Waikato basin and its Auckland market. That was ended in 1864 by the Invasion of the Waikato, when Te Rore was, for a few months, part of the supply route to four redoubts set up nearby. It is now a rural community in the Waipa District, 6 km (3.7 mi) north of Pirongia and roughly the same distance south of Ngāhinapōuri on State Highway 39.

== Early history ==
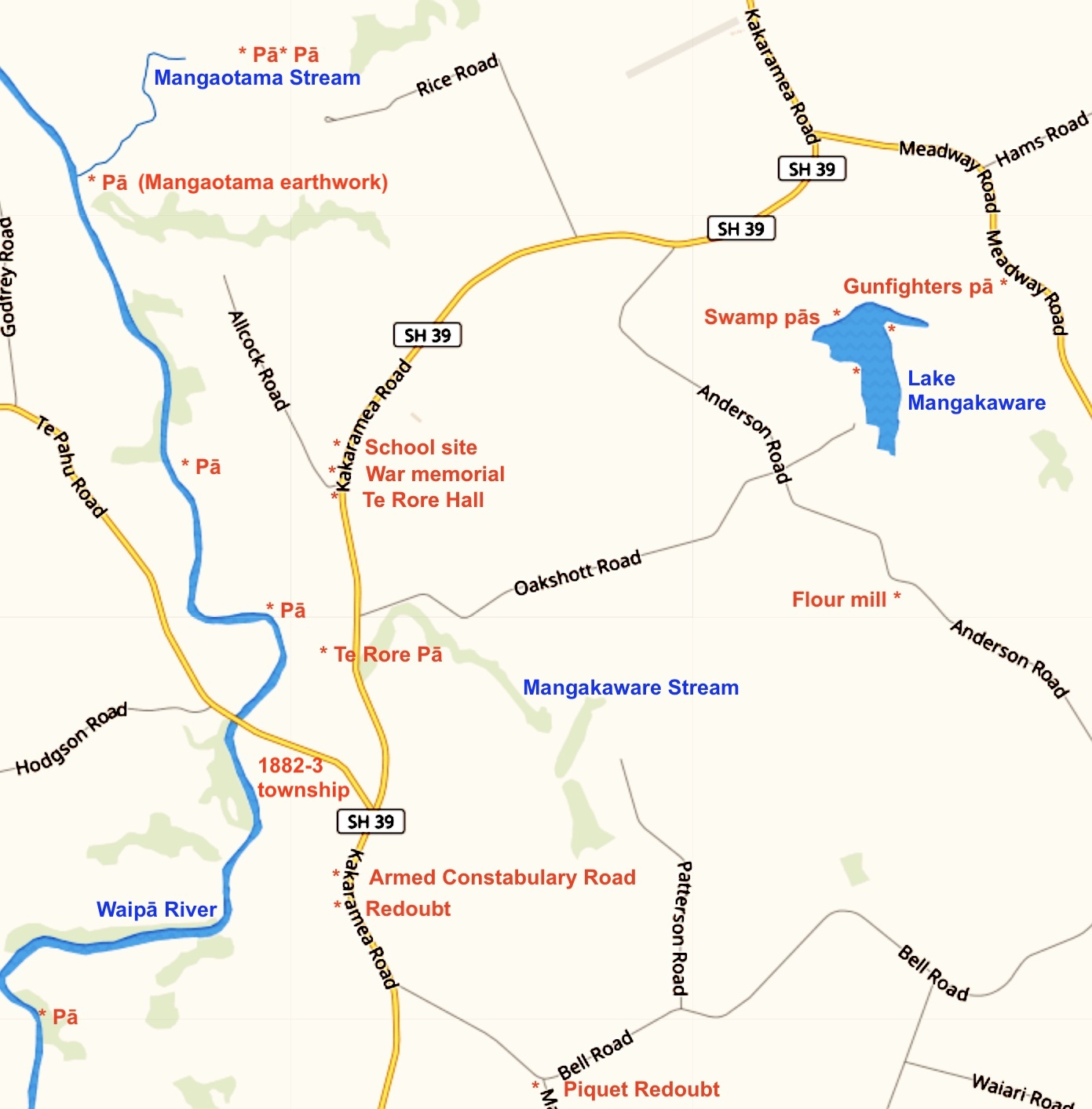
Historic sites around Te Rore

Between 1450 and 1750 Ngāti Puhiawe built swamp pās of 0.21 ha (0.52 acres) 2100, 0.164 ha (0.41 acres) and a smaller pā, around Lake Mangakaware. Many artefacts have been found in and around the lake, including beaters, pounders, paddles, fishing and eeling equipment, spears, weaving sticks, digging-sticks, spades, paddles, canoes, adze handles, weapons, rafters and palisades.

The Waipā River and its streams were lined with pā sites, those at Te Rore being among them. Te Rore pā was a pre-European pā, on a narrow, steep-sided, isolated ridge, north of Mangakaware Stream. It had a transverse ditch, pits and terraces, but no indication of European works. The pā is now covered by pasture and some large trees.

Defensive gunfighters' pās were built further away from waterways, probably in the later 1820s, when earlier pās became vulnerable to muskets.

The name Te Rore, the snare, originated in 1826, when Waikato ambushed Ngāpuhi Chief, Pomare to punish the breaking of a peace treaty and to revenge an earlier defeat at Mātakitaki. Most of the 500 warriors from the north were lured upstream by a small party from Waikato leaving the main Waikato force to snare them at Te Rore on their return.

== European settlement ==
John Vittoria Cowell, a Kawhia trader, was given about 40,000 acres (16,000 ha) by Ngāti Apakura in October 1839, on which he set up a trading station at Te Rore. He was the son of John Cowell, a lay missionary, who came to work with Samuel Marsden. Ferdinand von Hochstetter's 1859 map marked 'Mr. Cowell' as a location on the river, showing the track from it, which he used.

A water powered flour mill, costing £320, opened in 1855, on Anderson Road. It was one of almost 40 built around the Waikato at that time.

In 1864 Cowell’s house and trading sheds at Te Rore were burnt. One account said, "the General made his head-quarters at Te Rore, near a settler’s house named Cowell, which had been burned by the natives, as well as another belonging to a Mr. Heather". It seems more likely that General Cameron's troops burnt the house. John Cowell lost all his lands under the Confiscation Act and died in poverty. His Homewood house, to the south of Te Pahu, may date from 1841 and be the oldest surviving building in Waikato.

During the 1864 invasion Cameron had his headquarters at Te Rore, which he reached on 28 January 1864. Supplies were landed from steamers about a kilometre up from the current Te Rore Bridge. By 20 February 1864 3,000 of the 12th, 40th, 50th, 65th, and 70th regiments were in camp, preparing to attack the defensive line at Paterangi. Te Rore was the HQ until the 22 February advance to Te Awamutu. It remained the main transhipment point until that moved up to Pirongia in June 1864.

The Armed Constabulary Road was formed in 1876. 100m of the old road remain in a paddock, east of the main road.

Four redoubts were built in the area. The officer who organised supplies, Colonel Gamble, reported, "A redoubt has been constructed for 150 men on our main encampment which covers a good landing place for stores on the river bank . . . Another redoubt for 100 men has been constructed . . . and a third for 80 on the left bank . . . As our main piquet is about three quarters of a mile from the encampment a small redoubt has been constructed for them."

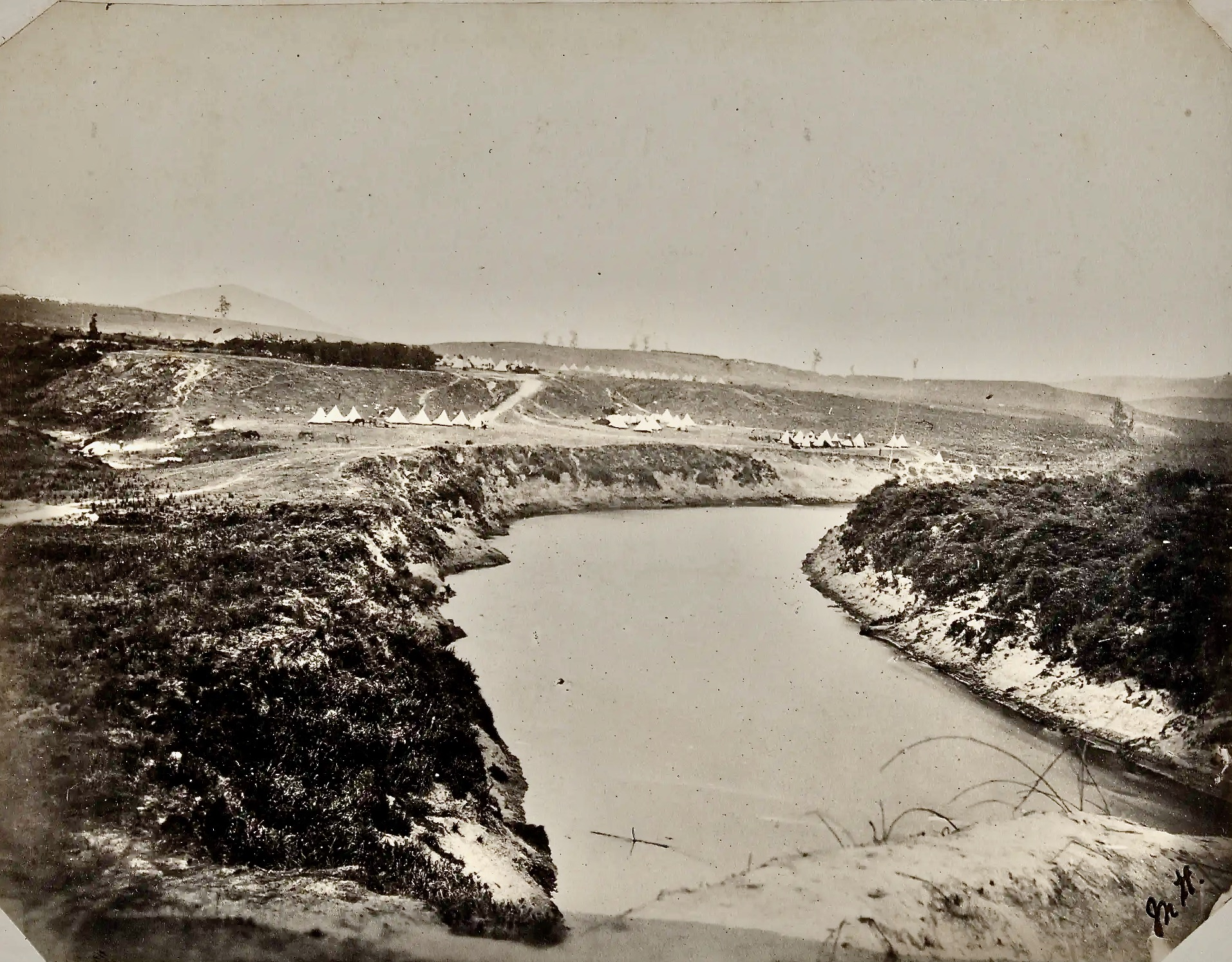
Head Quarters Camp in 1864

- The main redoubt was an irregular, 4-sided area on a hill, with a bastion to the west and a cemetery and hospital. It was between the main road and the river. Faint earthworks remain, covered by pasture and farmhouses.
- Te Rore Piquet was recorded in 1986. It was a small redoubt and is now largely covered by a house.
- Mangaotama earthwork may have been part of the 1864 defences. It had a 100 m (330 ft) ditch and two steep stream gullies to protect it, but is now also under pasture and its ditch has largely been filled in.

A war memorial marks the graves of 3 British troops who died in 1864 -

- William Connor, a private in the 40th Regiment, was in a line of sentries, when ambushed. He later died of his wounds.
- John O’Hanlon, from Cork, was a labourer, who joined the army on 8 June 1852 and died at Te Rore on 18 June 1864.
- He and John Wilson were privates in the 1st Battalion, 12th Regiment. Wilson died at Te Rore on 4 July 1864.

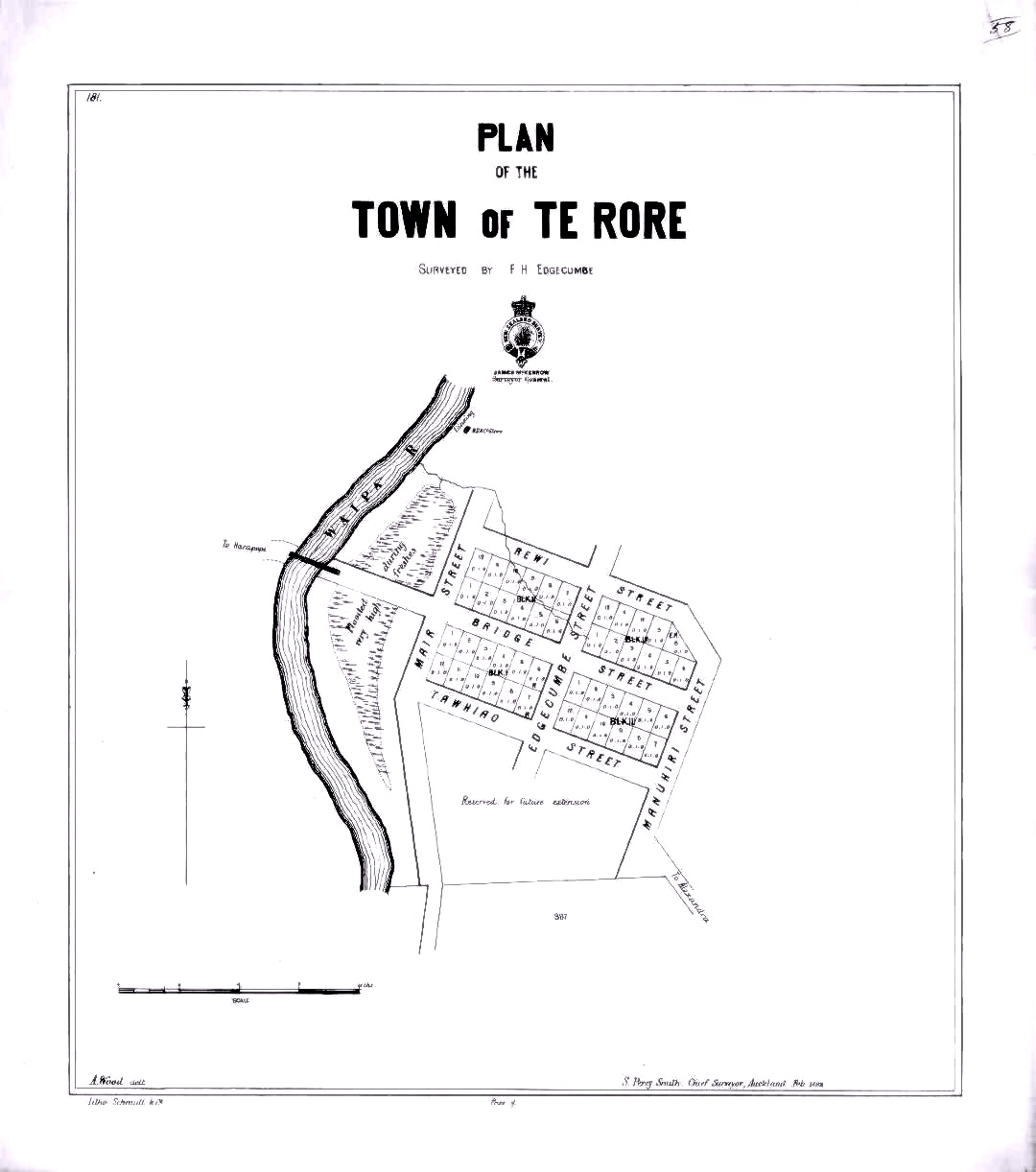
Te Rore 1882 plan

The graves were initially kept in good condition, but, on the 50th anniversary, Reverend D. McKenzie wrote, on 26 August 1914, telling the Inspector of Old Soldiers’ Graves, Edith Statham, that the wooden headboard names were illegible. A local committee was formed to maintain the graves and the County Council approved headstone designs. However, on 22 December 1914, the Under-Secretary for Internal Affairs, James Hislop, stopped further work. On 21 October 1918, a design in Coromandel granite was proposed. The committee collected £40 locally, and government matched that. On 22 January 1920 obelisks costing £80 were ordered for Te Rore and Paterangi and erected in February 1921. A War Memorial Rose Garden opened in July 1946 for 8 men who died in the World War 2. It was cleared and re-fenced in 2001.

In 1882 and 1883 the government advertised land for sale in a small township. The survey of 48 sections used the names of Tāwhiao and others associated with the peace agreement of 1881. Little seems to have come of the town plan. Seven of the 48 sections are still legal titles, but there remains only one hedge marking a boundary.

There were major floods in 1892, 1907 and February 1958.

== Later history ==
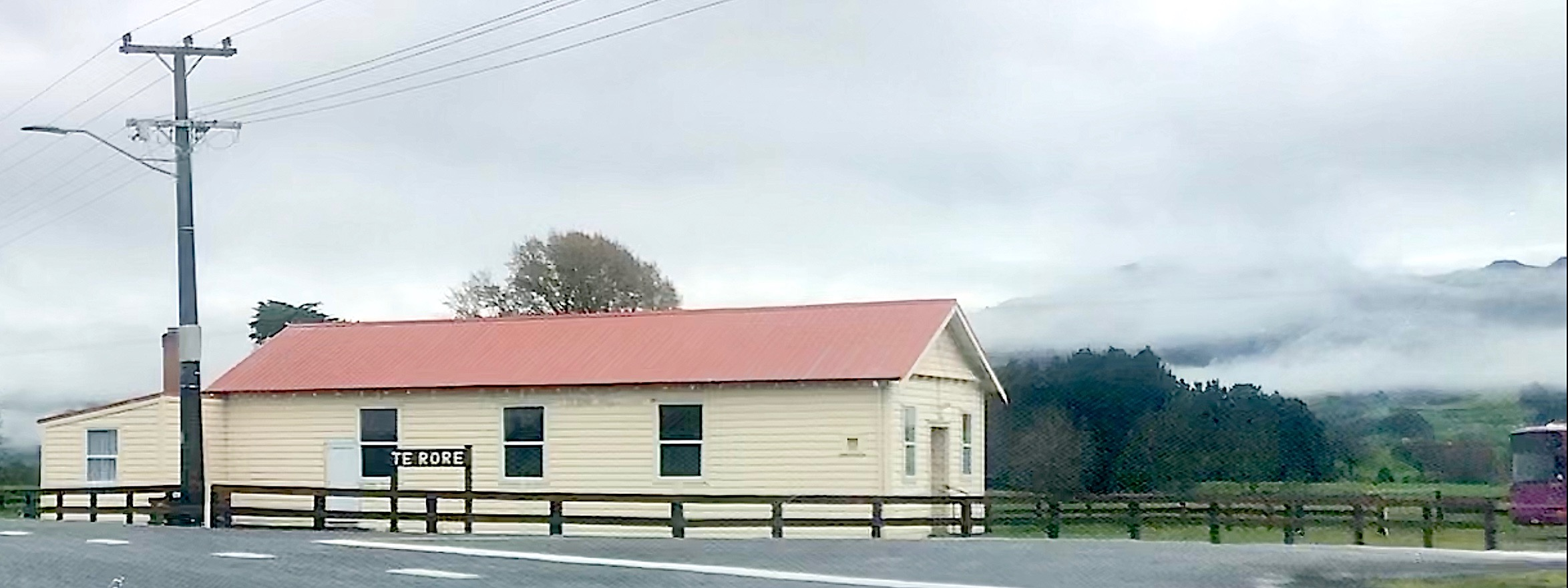
Te Rore Hall, with a misty Mount Pirongia behind

=== Hall ===
Te Rore has a community hall, opposite Te Rore NZ Wars memorial obelisk, beside Allcock Road. The hall opened on Wednesday 8 August 1934, after about a year of fundraising. Te Rore Hall Association Incorporated Society had been registered on 22 June 1934. The hall has rolls of honour for the war dead of both World Wars.

Presbyterian Church services were held at Te Rore from 1886, there was fundraising for an organ for their church in 1891 and services continued until 1932 Anglican services began that February, being held in the hall from at least 1934.

=== Dairy ===
Ambury, English & Co opened a creamery at Te Rore in 1908, on Mrs Totty's farm. In 1910 Ambury amalgamated with New Zealand Dairy Association and milk from Te Rore went to their Frankton factory, until 1937, when it switched to Te Awamutu.

=== Utilities ===
Electricity came to the area after an 11kV line was extended from Te Awamutu to Ōhaupō in 1920.

A water supply for Te Rore was taken from the Mangamauku Stream on Pirongia in about 1930 at a cost of some £5,000. A report prior to expiry of the consent to abstract water from the stream in 2011, said the filtration, chlorine disinfection and UV treatment facilities were inadequate and unreliable, but that the water was mainly used for irrigation. The piped water crosses the Waipā River on a bridge that was reported as in need of major repair, but remains in place. The scheme was transferred to Te Rore Water Supply Group in November 2012, when it was valued at $703,000 in Waipā District Council's accounts.

== Demographics ==
The Te Rore area unit was replaced in 2018 by the rather larger 94.58 km^{2} (36.52 sq mi) Lake Ngaroto area, which had a population of 1,170. The meshblock around the hall had a 2018 population of 144. Rates for Te Rore Hall were levied on 48 properties in 2020.

Historical population
Year	Pop.	±% p.a.
2006	144	—
2013	135	−0.92%
2018	159	+3.33%

The statistical unit 7012661, which covers 12.57 km^{2} (4.85 sq mi) around Te Rore Hall, had a population of 159 at the 2018 New Zealand census, an increase of 24 people (17.8%) since the 2013 census, and an increase of 15 people (10.4%) since the 2006 census. There were 51 households. There were 81 males and 78 females, giving a sex ratio of 1.04 males per female. The median age was 35.3 years (compared with 37.4 years nationally), with 39 people (24.5%) aged under 15 years, 30 (18.9%) aged 15 to 29, 75 (47.2%) aged 30 to 64, and 12 (7.5%) aged 65 or older.

Ethnicities were 94.3% European/Pākehā, 9.4% Māori, and 1.9% Asian (totals add to more than 100% since people could identify with multiple ethnicities).

Although some people objected to giving their religion, 56.6% had no religion, 30.2% were Christian and 3.8% had other religions.

Of those at least 15 years old, 18 (15.0%) people had a bachelor or higher degree, and 15 (12.5%) people had no formal qualifications. The median income was $45,100, compared with $31,800 nationally. The employment status of those at least 15 was that 81 (67.5%) people were employed full-time and 18 (15.0%) were part-time.

== Education ==
Te Rore School was a co-educational state primary school, opened in 1880 and closed in 1986. It was just to the north of the war memorial. The building was moved to Ngāhinapōuri in 1993.

== Lake Mangakaware ==
Lake Mangakaware is a peat lake, which became a Recreational Reserve in 1981. It covers 12.9 ha (32 acres), is less than 5 m (16 ft) deep and has a catchment of around 300 ha (740 acres). By 1987/1988 Mangakaware was hypertrophic with a pH between 6.7 and 7.2. A restoration programme since 2014 has included tree planting and silt traps and will cost almost $1.5m. An access road, off Anderson Road, and car park were built in 2016. Further work on archaeological dating was done in 2019. Metsulphuron is sprayed roughly annually to control alligator weed.

== Mangaotama Stream ==
Mangaotama Stream flows from Lake Ngaroto and enters the Waipā north of Te Rore. Another stream, with the same name, enters the Waipā, about 15 km (9.3 mi) to the north, at Karakariki. Mangaotama Stream and Wetland Trust plans to restore a 30 ha (74 acres) wetland along 2.5 km (1.6 mi) of the stream. The Trust was registered in 2019. Work has included willow clearance and replanting.

== Transport ==
Until roads were built, the main transport was along the river, which took about 3 days to paddle from the Awaroa River, via the Waikato, to Te Rore. By the 1850s there was an 8 mi (13 km) dray road linking Te Rore with Te Awamutu, built under the supervision of Te Awamutu missionary, John Morgan. The road was used by Governor Gore Browne when he visited in 1857. From 1864 the river was navigated by steamers, including the Avon, and Freetrader.

In 1881, a bridge replaced a ferry to Harapepe and Te Pahū. That bridge was replaced by the present one in 1957. In the 1958 flood only its side rails could be seen above the floodwaters. In 1928 it was noted that a drought made the river unnavigable and in 1925 there were complaints about the number of cars stuck on the mud roads. A bus route linked Te Rore with Pirongia, Whatawhata and Hamilton from 1926. In 1932 Lewis Hodgson took over and it was still running in 1942. About 1970 SH39 was straightened and widened. It had previously been a turning from Allcock Road. In 2019 average daily traffic on SH39 at Meadway Road, just north of Te Rore, was 8,524, of which 13.9% were heavy vehicles, up from 5,480 (12.4%) a decade earlier.

== See also ==
Te Rore Bridge
