= Pirongia Forest Park =

Protected area in New Zealand

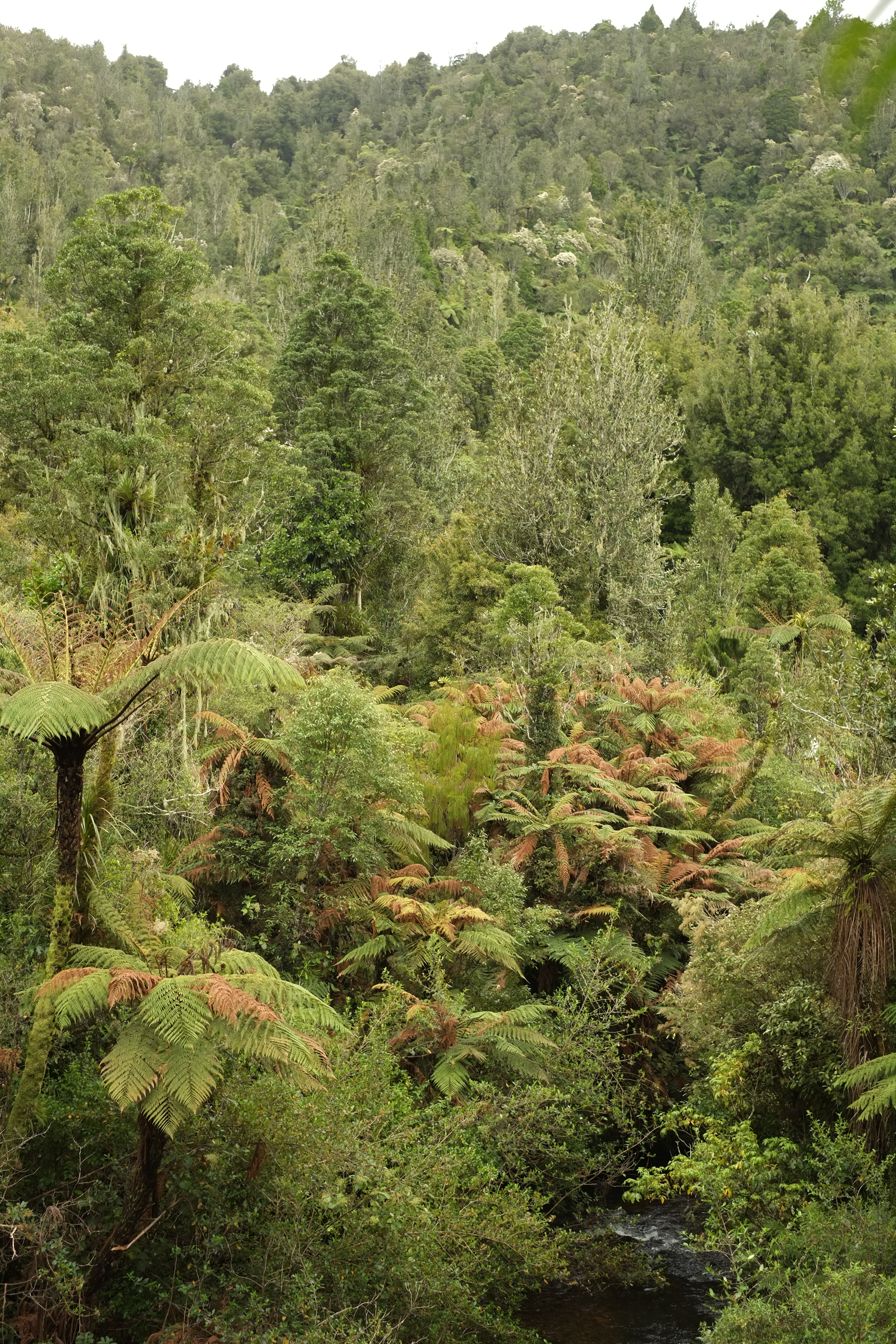
- Native bush in Pirongia Forest

- Location within New Zealand
- Location: North Island, New Zealand
- Nearest town: Pirongia
- Coordinates: 37°59′S 175°6′E
- Area: 16,773.4 hectares (41,448 acres)
- Established: 1971
- Governing body: Department of Conservation

Pirongia Forest Park is a protected area 30 kilometres (19 miles) southwest of Hamilton, New Zealand. It covers 167.7 square kilometres (64.7 sq mi) across four blocks of land - Pirongia (the largest), Te Maunga O Karioi Block, and the small Mangakino Block and Te Rauamoa Block. The park encompasses Mount Pirongia west of Pirongia and Mount Karioi near the coast southwest of Raglan. Wairēinga / Bridal Veil Falls Scenic Reserve is located nearby, but is separate to Pirongia Forest Park.

== History ==
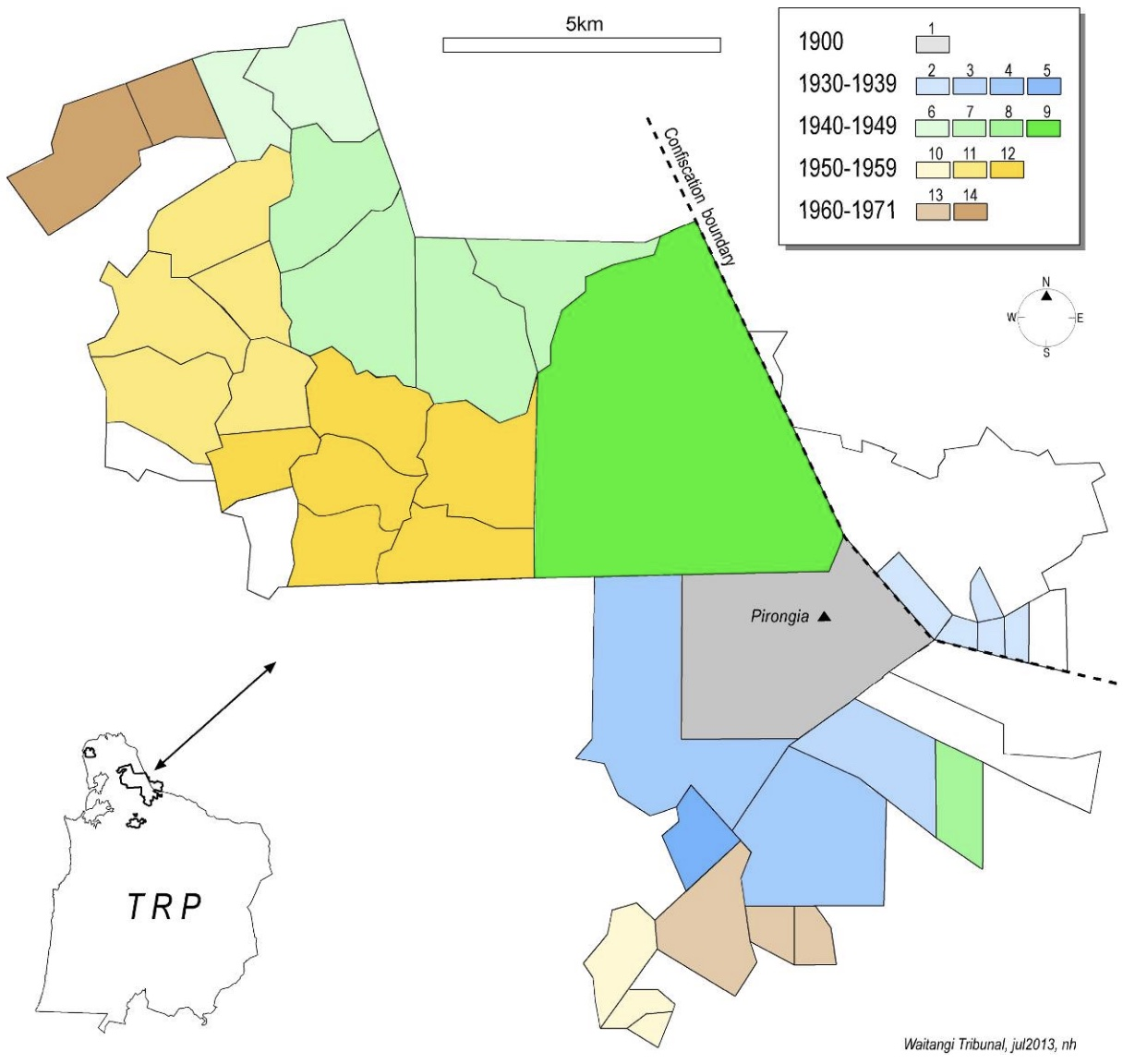
Map of lands included in Pirongia Forest Park at its establishment in 1971 and the date each section was set apart as State Forest land

Prior to colonisation Ngāti Apakura, Ngāti Hikairo and Ngāti Māhanga occupied most of the current area of the Forest Park. A small area to the north east (see map of lands) was included in the 1865 confiscation area. That boundary now largely defines the area remaining as bush. The remaining area remained in Māori ownership until the summit area was bought in 1900 and further purchases and donations were added to the area until the Park was declared in 1971. The Public Reserves, Domains, and National Parks Act, 1928 allowed the Pirongia and Wainui Domain Boards to buy land in 1932. A scenic reservation of 2,183 acres (883 ha), including 1,700 acres (690 ha) purchased with help from the Bruce Trustees, was declared in 1937. Later additions to the Park were Karioi in 1976 (after which the area was 14,306 ha (35,350 acres)) and Tapuwaeohounuku (also proposed to be named Te Rauamoa Block and formerly State Forest 56, of about 7,462 acres (3,020 ha)), on either side of Kaimango Rd, in 1984.

== Flora and fauna ==
The park's climate is mild and wet, with humid summers and temperate winters. The area around Mount Pirongia receives over 2,400 mm of rain per year. Most of the park is covered in podocarp forest of rimu, totara, kahikatea and tawa with a dense understorey rich in tree ferns. Pirongia Forest Park lies at the natural southern limit of kauri forest. Towards the south of the forest park, the forest increasingly contains beech.

The forest is inhabited by many native bird species such as kererū, tūī, bellbirds, fantails, morepork, and silvereyes, as well as rarer birds such as grey warblers, tomtits, and the occasional kākā.

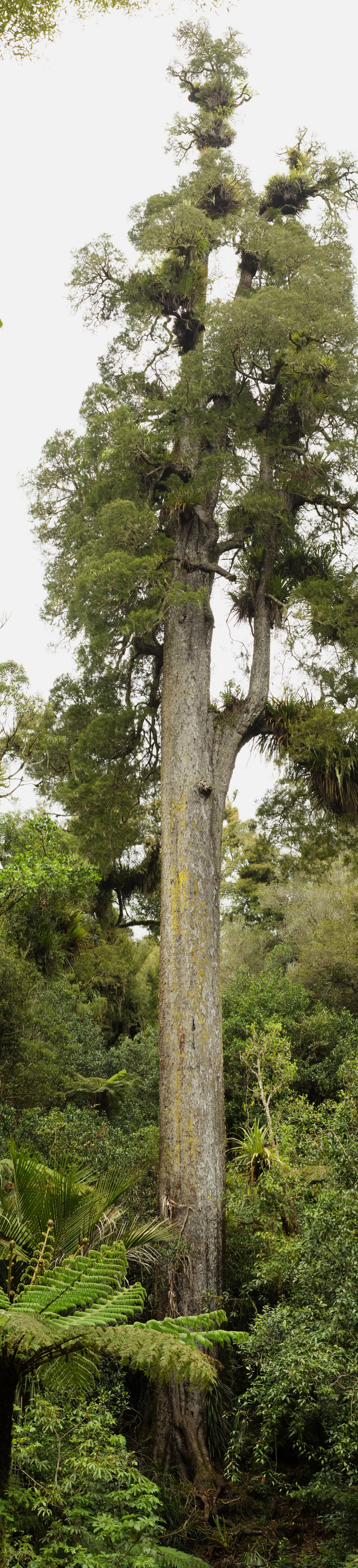
Kahikatea, tallest native tree in NZ

== Recreation ==
The park contains several short walks as well as longer bush tramps leading to the summits of both mountains. Popular walks are the Nikau Track, also suitable for cycling, and a walking track to the Kaniwhaniwha Caves, two small limestone caves. A longer track, following the Bell Track, leads to the tallest kahikatea tree. This 66.5 m tall tree is the tallest recorded native tree in New Zealand. The Bell Track continues to the Mount Pirongia summit, which is also accessible via other tracks.

Recreational hunting is encouraged, as it controls introduced wild animal populations such as goats. Brown trout can be found in the Kaniwhaniwha Stream. Permits/licenses are required for both activities.

Accommodation options are three free campsites, a lodge, and a hut near the summit of Mount Pirongia.

== See also ==
- Forest parks of New Zealand
- Protected areas of New Zealand
