= Puniu River =

River in New Zealand

Coordinates: 38°01′S 175°13′E

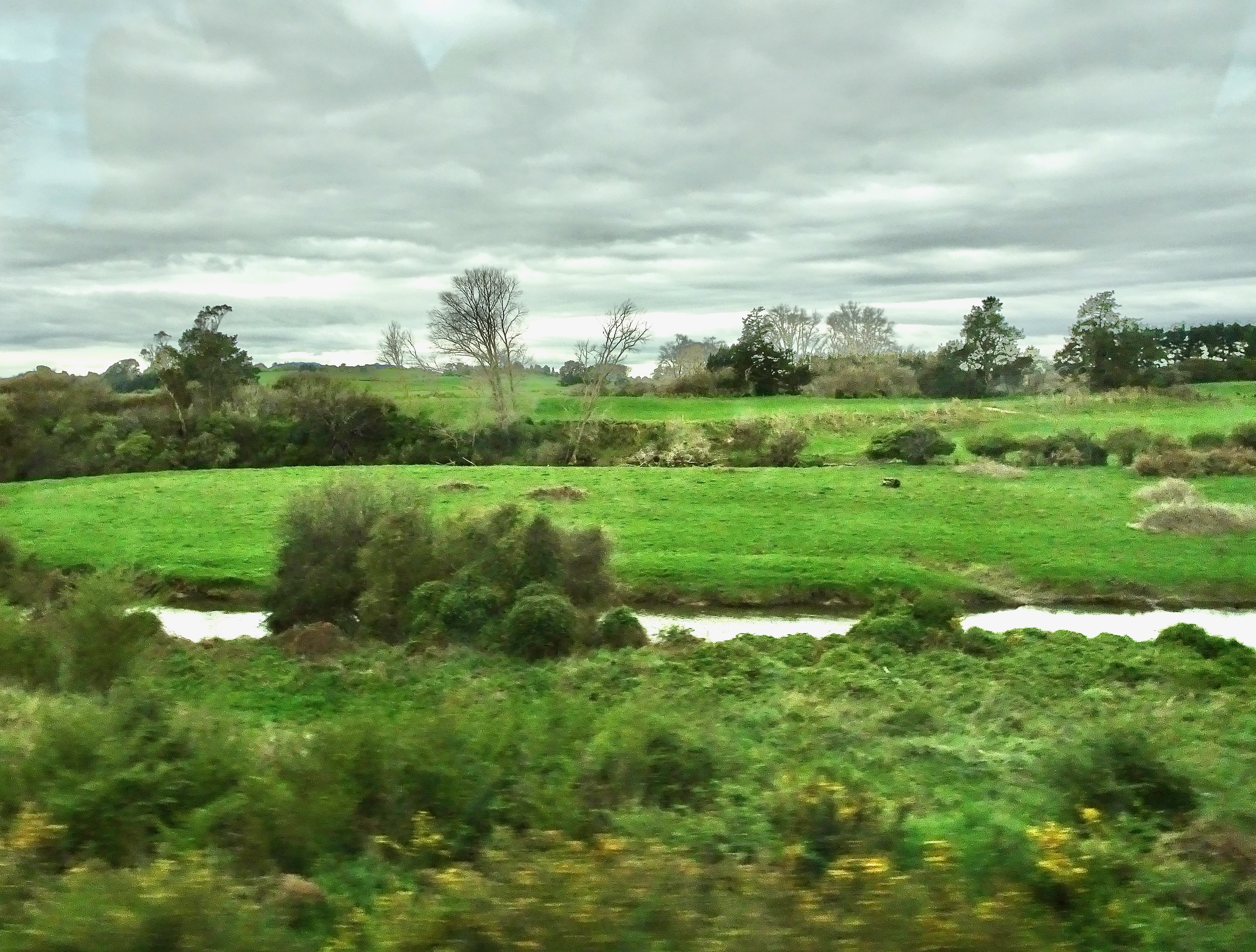
- Puniu River from North Island Main Trunk

Location
- Country: New Zealand

Physical characteristics
- Source
  - elevation: 686 m (2,251 ft)
- Mouth
  - location: Waipā River
  - elevation: 30 m (98 ft)
- Length: 57 km (35 mi)
- Basin size: 527 km^{2} (203 sq mi)
- Discharge
  - average: 15 m^{3}/s (530 cu ft/s)

The Puniu River is a river of the Waikato region of New Zealand's North Island. As a tributary of the Waipā River (itself a tributary of the Waikato River), and at a length of 57 kilometres (35 mi), it is one of the longest secondary tributaries in New Zealand.

The Puniu flows initially north from sources within the Pureora Forest Park, veering northwest to pass south of the towns of Kihikihi and Te Awamutu before meeting the Waipā River 3 km (2 mi) south of Pirongia.

== Geology ==
About half the river's course from its sources on the edge of the Rangitoto Range is through deep valleys and gorges formed of Late Jurassic to Early Cretaceous Manaia Hill Group greywacke (a form of sandstone, with little or no bedding, fine to medium grained, interbedded with siltstone and conglomerate, and with many quartz veins), which is buried in many places by Quaternary ignimbrites. The main ignimbrite is the Ongatiti Formation, up to 150 m thick of compound, weakly to strongly welded, vitrophyric, including pumice-, andesite and rhyolite lavas. In several places the river runs past slopes covered in blocks of ignimbrite, where the underlying greywacke has eroded.

For the remainder of its course, the river meanders over alluvium and colluvium to the Waipa. Initially these are mainly the Late Quaternary Piako Subgroup, which includes Late Pleistocene alluvium, and minor fan deposits of unconsolidated to very soft, thinly to thickly bedded, yellow-grey to orange-brown, pumiceous mud, silt, sandy mud and gravel, with local muddy peat. Finally, the river flows mostly over the Holocene floodplain, where the alluvium and colluvium consist of variously coloured, unconsolidated sand, silt, mud, clay, local gravel and thin intercalated (a form of interbedding, where distinct deposits in close proximity migrate back and forth) peat beds.

== Vegetation ==
The river rises in the Pureora Forest Park, before flowing past some unprotected remnants of rimu-tawa forest. In its lower reaches the river mostly flows through farmland, where the Puniu River Care Project is working on restoration of the river.

== Speed of flow ==
In its final 22 km (14 mi) from Tokanui flows usually take 9 to 17 hours, depending on river levels.

== Pollution ==
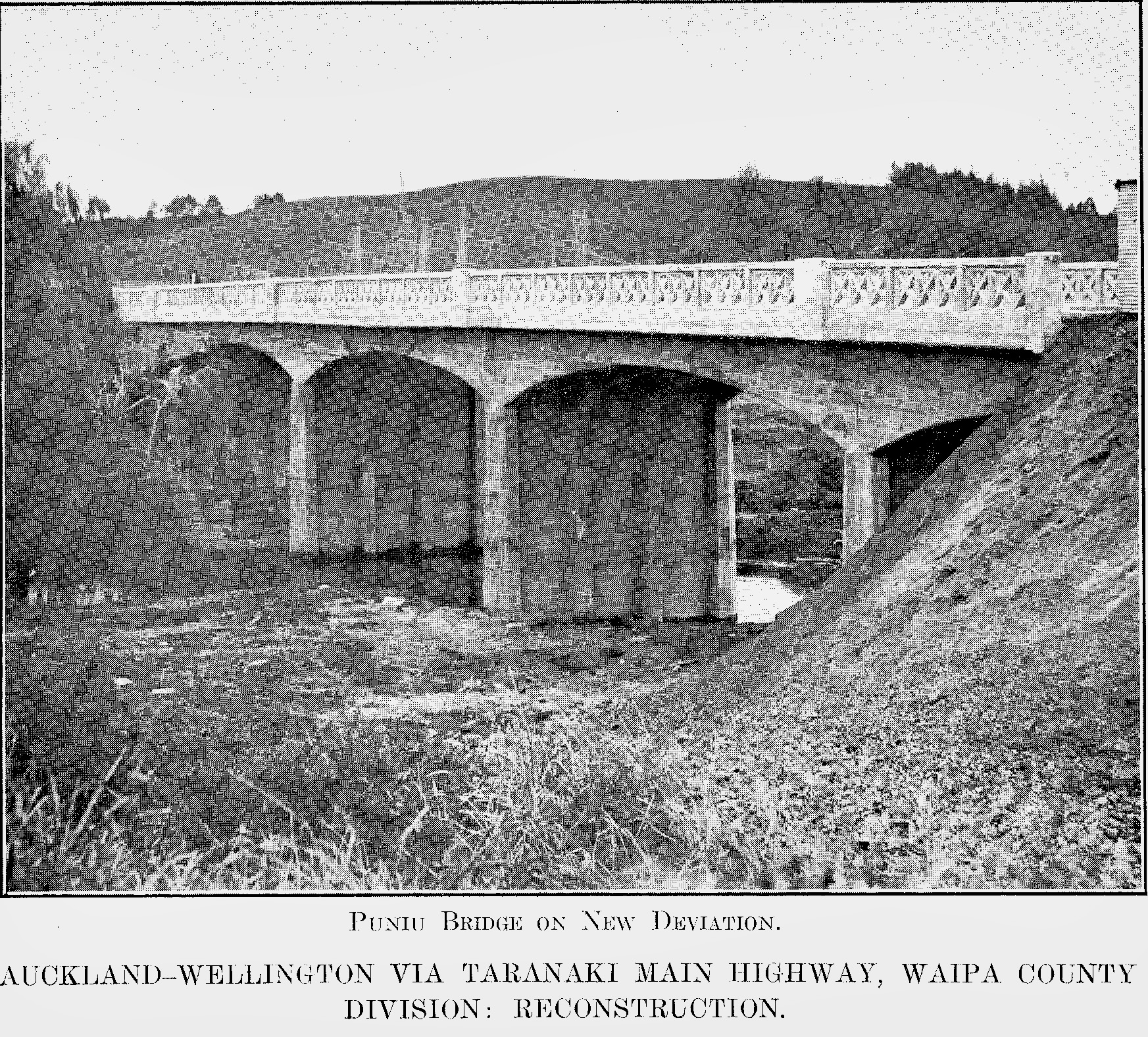
SH3 bridge, near Kihikihi, in 1936

The Puniu is 6th dirtiest out of 13 sampling points in the Waipa catchment, with unsatisfactory nitrogen, phosphorus and turbidity levels. Puniu is the only river in Waikato with worsening ammonia levels.

== Bridges ==
The river originally had a seasonal ford near Kihikihi. The first bridge there was built about 1885, when the 300 ft (91 m) long railway bridge was also built. A 228 ft (69 m) ferro-concrete bridge replaced the old wooden bridge, 22 ch (443 m) downstream. It was largely built in 1936, completed in 1937 and still serves SH3.

== See also ==
- List of rivers of New Zealand
