= Rangitoto Range =

Mountain range in New Zealand

Coordinates: 38°25′S 175°35′E

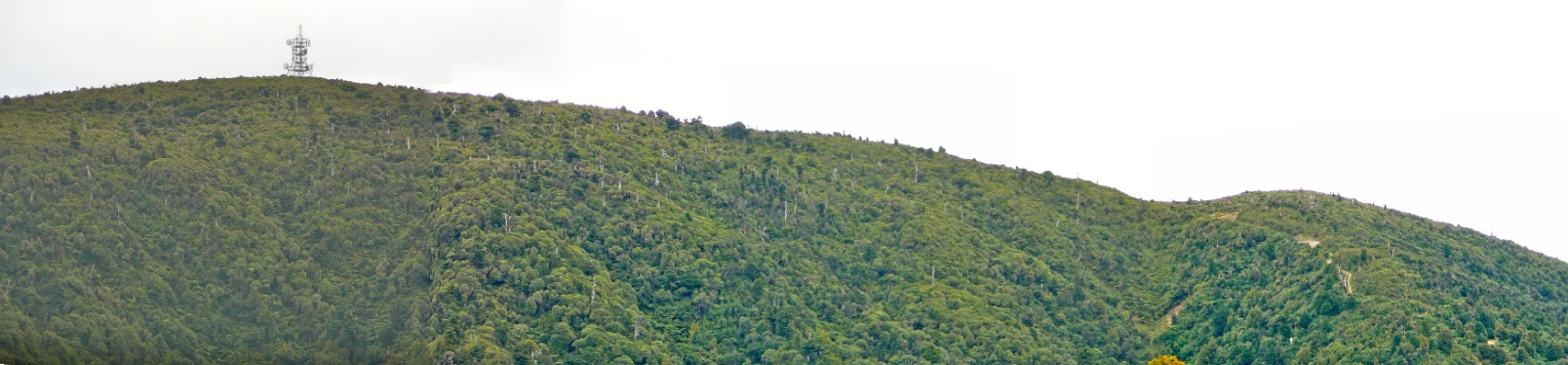
- Ranginui repeater station and access track

Highest point
- Elevation: 978 m (3,209 ft)

Geography
- Location: Waikato, New Zealand
- Topo map: Bennydale BF34

Rangitoto Range is in the Pureora Forest Park in the North Island of New Zealand. Its main peaks are Ranginui (978 m (3,209 ft)), Mt Baldy (855 m) and Rangitoto (873 m). It has the headwaters of the Waipā, Puniu and Mōkau Rivers and forms the eastern boundary of the King Country. Streams on the eastern slopes drain into the Waikato River.

== Conservation ==
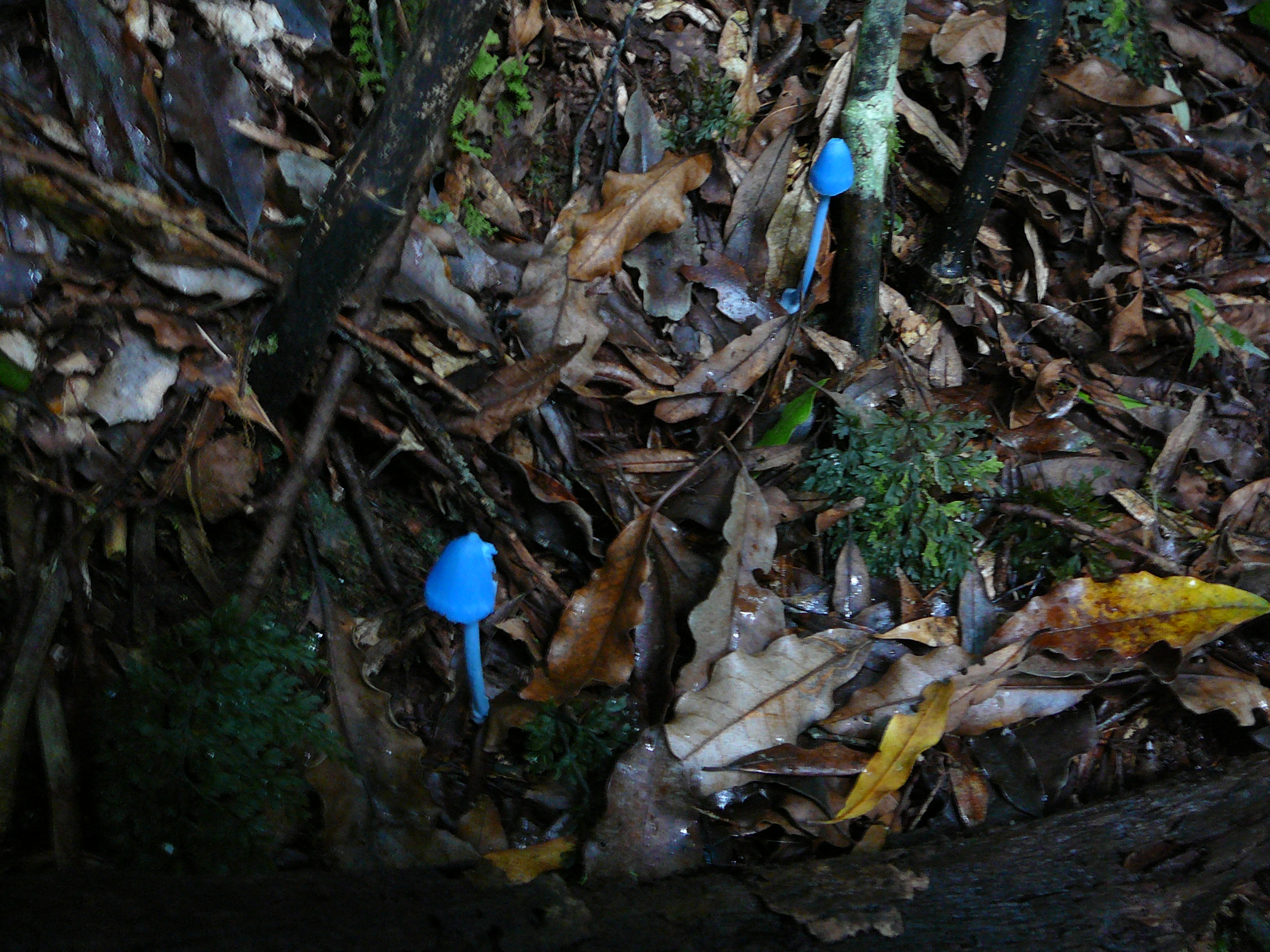
Blue Entoloma hochstetteri toadstools on the red and white track

The ranges have the last area of native forest to be opened for logging. After protests and occupations some areas of tōtara and rewarewa native forests were preserved and logged areas are being restored. Endangered species present include North Island kōkako, kākā, falcon, North Island brown kiwi, blue duck, bats and Hochstetter's frog.

== Geology ==
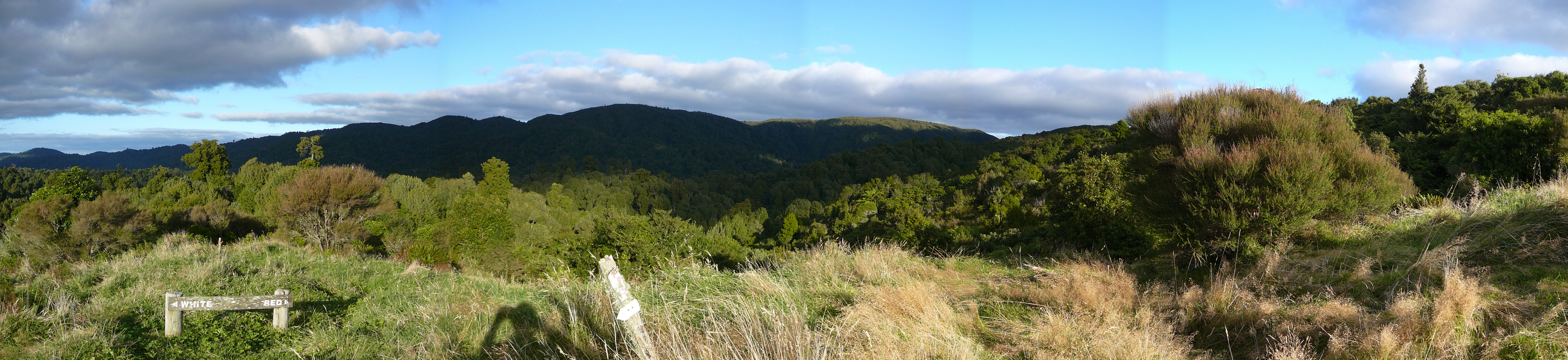
Rangitoto Range from junction of red and white tracks

The Range is formed of Late Jurassic to Early Cretaceous Manaia Hill Group greywacke (a form of sandstone, with little or no bedding, fine to medium grained, interbedded with siltstone and conglomerate, and with many quartz veins), buried in many places by Quaternary ignimbrites. The main ignimbrite is the Ongatiti Formation, up to 150 m thick of compound, weakly to strongly welded, vitrophyric, including pumice-, andesite and rhyolite lavas from the Mangakino caldera complex. The ignimbrite forms round, flat-topped hills, edged by eroding banks, covered in blocks of ignimbrite, where the underlying greywacke has eroded.
