= Waipā River =

River in New Zealand

Coordinates: 37°41′S 175°09′E

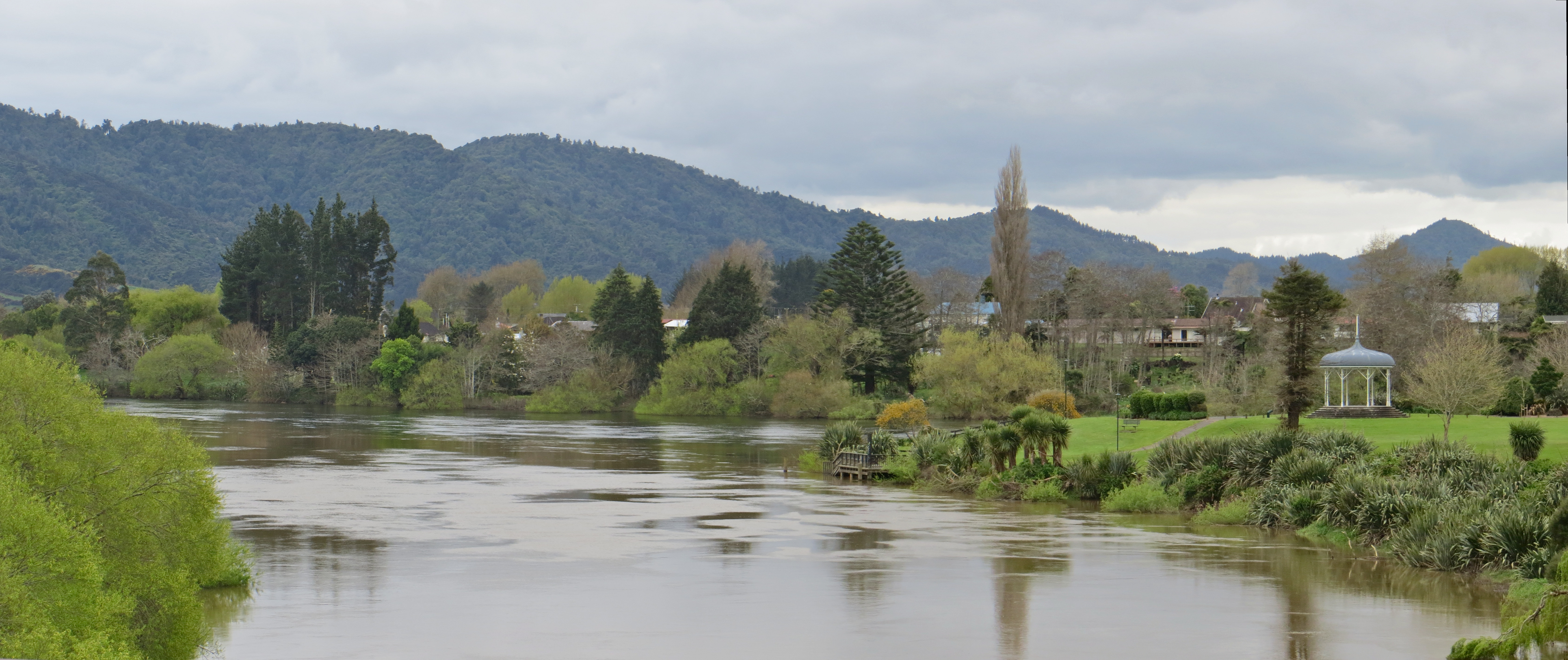
- From Waingaro Rd bridge looking north down Waipā River to Ngāruawāhia Point bandstand, the Waikato (coming from right) and the Hakarimata Range in the background (19 September 2012)

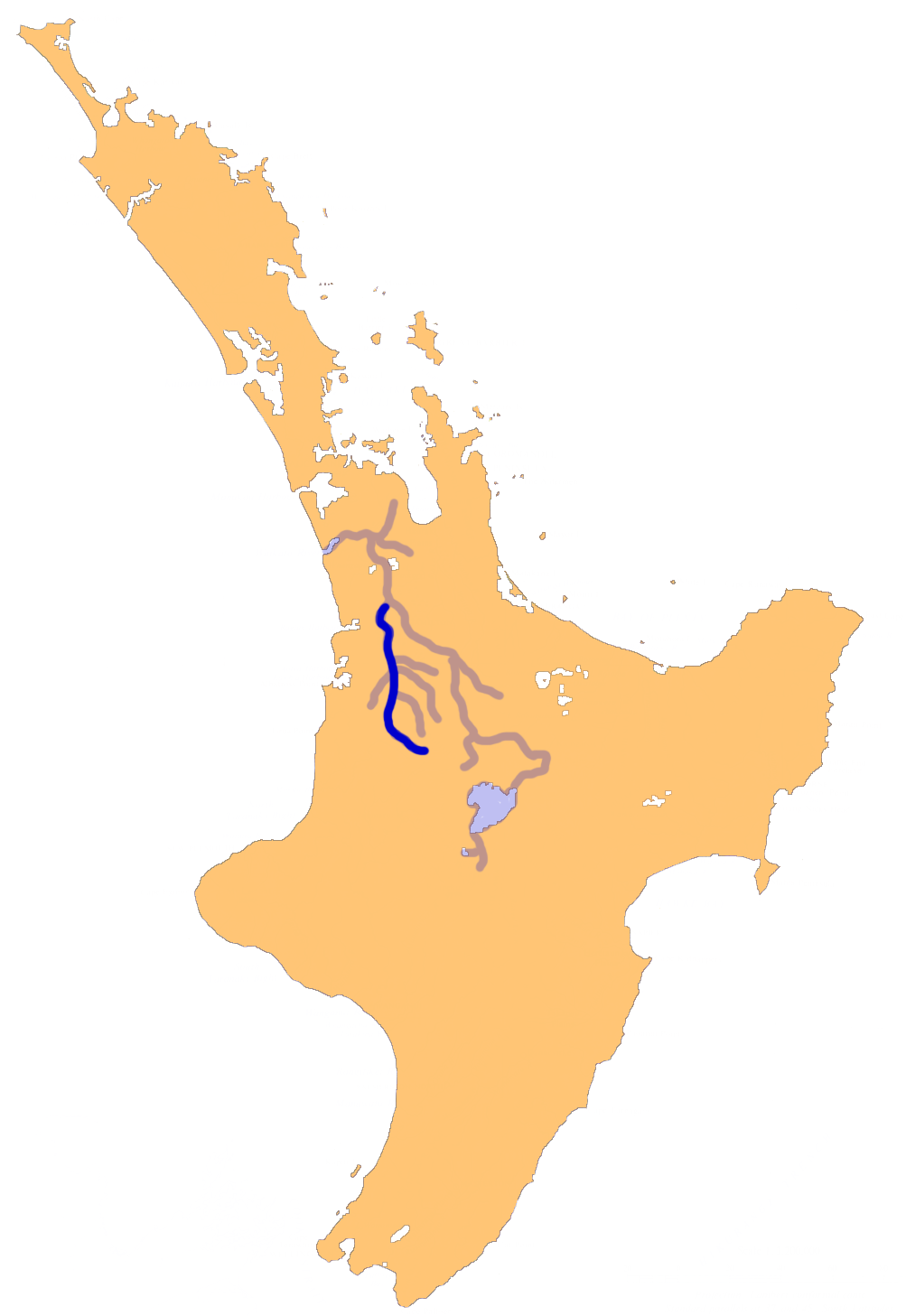
- The Waipā River – The Waikato's largest tributary

Location
- Country: New Zealand

Physical characteristics
- Source
  - location: Rangitoto Range
  - elevation: 703 m (2,306 ft)
- Mouth
  - location: Waikato River
  - elevation: 20 m (66 ft)
- Length: 115 km (71 mi)
- Basin size: 3,050 km^{2} (1,180 mi^{2})
- Discharge
  - average: 83.9 m^{3}/s (2,960 cu ft/s)

Basin features
- Tributaries
  - left: Wharekiri Stream, Kaama Stream, Waiharakea Stream, Otanetapoto Stream, Mangawhaka Stream, Ngakuratro Stream, Mangawhero Stream, Mangapu River, Orahiri Stream, Waitomo Stream, Mangamahoe Stream, Owaikura Stream, Ongaruhe Stream, Moakurarua Stream, Ngakoaohia Stream, Mangauika Stream, Ngaparierua Stream, Mangawawe Stream, Mangamauku Stream, Mangao Stream, Rangitukia Stream, Paratawa Stream, Tunaeke Stream, Karakariki Stream, Mangaotama Stream, Karangatuoro Stream, Timaru Stream, Te Paki Stream, Maroheno Stream, Firewood Creek, Mangarata Stream.
  - right: Otamaroa Stream, Okahukura Stream, Mata Stream, Tunawaea Stream, Owawenga Stream, Tauraroa Stream, Parapara Stream, Mohoanui Stream, Mangaoronga Stream, Okuri Stream, Okohau Stream, Mangawhero Stream, Puniu River, Mangapiko Stream, Mangakaware Stream, Mangaotama Stream, Mangahia Stream, Koromatua Stream, Ohote Stream.

The Waipā River is in the Waikato region of the North Island of New Zealand. The headwaters are in the Rangitoto Range east of Te Kūiti. It flows north for 115 kilometres (71 mi), passing through Ōtorohanga and Pirongia, before flowing into the Waikato River at Ngāruawāhia. It is the Waikato's largest tributary. The Waipā's main tributary is the Puniu River.

In the headwaters upstream of Ōtorohanga the river can be very clear during low flow conditions. This section of the river flows through rough farmland and patches of native bush. In this clearer part of the river there can be very good fly fishing for trout but access to the river may be limited without landowner permission.

The Waipā is prone to flooding in its lower reaches as flood flows can be over 100 times—20 to 560 m^{3}/s (710 to 19,780 cu ft/s)—those of dry flows and the river can rise up to 11 m (36 ft).

In 2013 Maniapoto Māori Trust Board and the riparian local councils set up a joint management agreement for the river, following the passing of Nga Wai o Maniapoto ( Waipā River) Act 2012. On 16 July 2020 the official name was gazetted as Waipā River.

== Speed of flow ==
The table below shows the time water takes to flow the 130 km (81 mi) from Te Kūiti to its confluence with the Waikato in times of low flow (15% of days are slower than this) and high flow (15% of days faster).

		time (hrs)	
Place	km	low	high
Te Kuiti	0	0	0
Ōtorohanga	37	20	13
Pirongia	73	40	25
Whatawhata	101	59	36
Ngāruawāhia	130	98	49

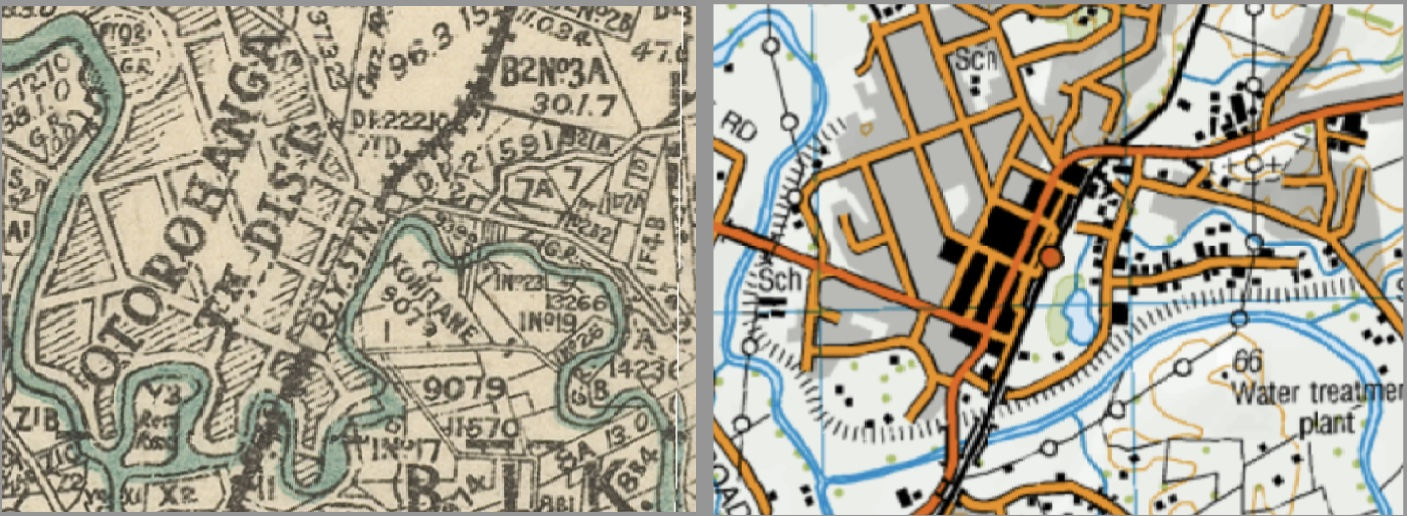
1934 and 2014 Ōtorohanga maps, showing the diversions of the Waipā. In 2004 the river flooded its old course.

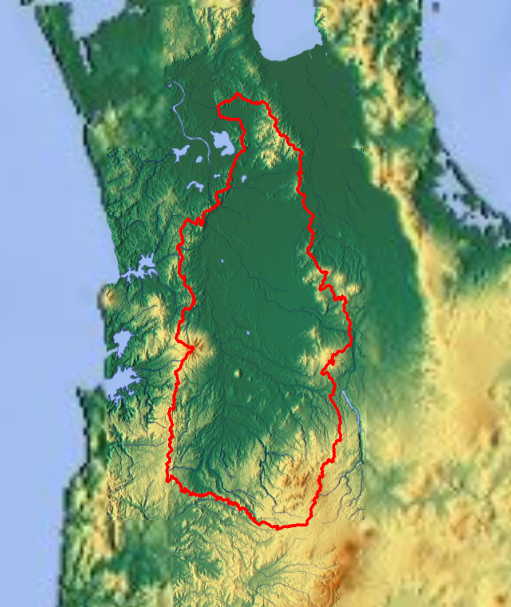
A Map of the Waipa Valley along its endorheic basins

== Floods ==
Years with large floods have included 1875, 1892, 1893, 1897, 1907, 1926, 1930, 1946, 1953, 1958, 1986, 1988, 1989, 1991, 1995, 1998, 2002, 2004 2012 and 2026.

In August 1893 the river was 3 inches (7.6 cm) higher than it was in during the 1875 flood. Maunder's mill at Whatawhata and bridges on the Whatawhata to Tuhikaramea road were washed away.

A minimum flow of 718 ft^{3} (20.3 m^{3})/second was measured in 1946 and a flood flow of over 2,000 ft^{3} (57 m^{3})/sec was measured in the May 1953 floods. In 1958 hundreds of houses were flooded in Ōtorohanga and Te Kūiti. The July 1998 peak flows in the upper Waipā 776 were the highest recorded since 1958 and at Whatawhata flows were 776 ft^{3} (22.0 m^{3})/sec, compared to 1,130 ft^{3} (32 m^{3})/sec in 1958.

In July 2002 flows at Whatawhata were 570 ft^{3} (16 m^{3})/sec and, in March 2004, 815 ft^{3} (23.1 m^{3})/sec. The 2004 flood was comparable to that of 1958. At Ōtorohanga, the Primary School and surrounding houses were flooded, when the river spilled into its old course (see map below) and filled the area behind the stop banks. There was also flooding in July 2012.

== Power stations ==
In 2003 Hydro Power Ltd was given consent to build a hydro-electric power station, with weirs in the Okahukura Stream, upstream from Owen Falls, and penstocks carrying water down the gorge to a station on the west bank 2.5 kilometres (1.6 mi) below the falls. Work was done in 2006, but, in 2007, Hydro Energy ( Waipā) Ltd was fined for unconsented damage to native vegetation in building the penstock. The resource was initially estimated to be able to generate 10 to 20MW. Construction halted, though Renewable Power Ltd bought the asset in 2010 and estimates potential at 9MW.

In 2017 Nova Energy gained consent to build a 360MW gas-turbine station (connected to the Maui Gas Pipeline) on the Ongaruhe Stream, close to its confluence with the Waipā. The mid-merit Waikato Power Plant at 869 Kawhia Rd, Ōtorohanga was expected to be used for 10 to 15 minutes, 3 or 4 times a day, but was shelved in 2021.

== Pollution ==
Waikato Regional Council measures water quality monthly at five sites from Mangaokewa to Whatawhata. The measurements show poor quality along most of the river, with excess nitrogen, silt and phosphorus, though E. coli levels have improved with improved sewage treatment, though generally not enough for safe swimming; recreational rivers should have median E. coli levels below 126 per 100ml, but Waipā's range from 160 to 320. Turbidity levels north of Ōtorohanga rise to more than double the levels needed to support plant photosynthesis and phosphorus levels also rise above targets in that stretch. Nitrogen levels increased at all five sites between 1993 and 2012 due to intensified land use, now adding 3,075 tonnes a year. By comparison, the total from sewage works and Te Awamutu dairy factory is 66 tonnes.

Ministry for the Environment figures averaged between 1998 and 2007 showed the Waipā at Ōtorohanga had 280 E.coli per 100ml (53rd worst out of 154), 360 faecal coliforms per 100ml (83rd of 252), 0.55 mg/litre nitrogen (161th of 342) and 0.03 mg/litre phosphorus (187th of 361).

At Pirongia the figures were 390 E.coli per 100ml (35th worst out of 154), 425 faecal coliforms per 100ml (64th of 252), 0.49 mg/litre nitrogen (174th of 342) and 0.06 mg/litre phosphorus (80th of 361).

At Whatawhata the figures were 0.92 mg/litre nitrogen (94th of 342) and 0.06 mg/litre phosphorus (69th of 361).

In the Mangaokewa stream 0.02 mg/litre phosphorus (237th of 361).

Pollution has been worsening for nitrogen and phosphorus, though turbidity has improved, as shown in this table of important (ie slope direction probability over 95% and RSKSE over ±1% pa) improvements, or deteriorations (-) in relative seasonal Kendall slope estimator (RSKSE) trends (% per year). in the river at Whatawhata (monthly records are flow-adjusted using a Lowess curve fit with 30% span.) -

	Turbidity	Nitrate-N	Dissolved reactive P
1993–2017	2.0		−1.2
2008–2017	5.9	−2.0	

== Soil conservation ==
Regional Council estimates that 8,718 ha (21,540 acres) is at risk of severe erosion in the Middle Waipā (Waitomo, Turitea, Pirongia, Karakariki, Puniu, Mangaotama, Mangawhero and Mangapiko catchments) and 350 km (220 mi) of stream bank to be prone to erosion. Project Watershed plans for planting on 1,594 ha (3,940 acres), plus 976 km of stream bank and 1,332 km of fencing, from 2017 to 2026.

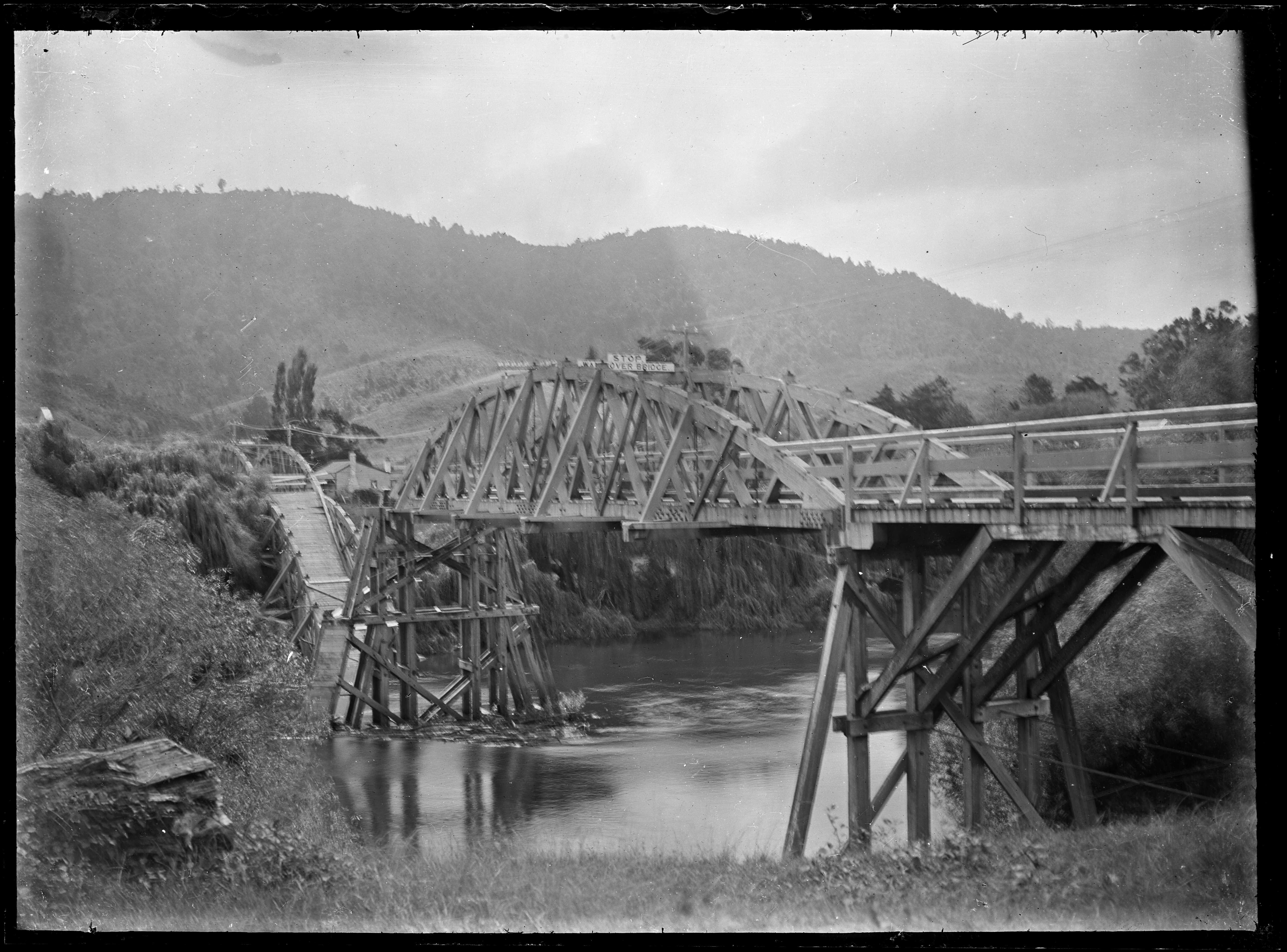
Aftermath of a 1916 bridge collapse on the Waipā River at Ngāruawāhia

=== Organic farming ===
In 2018 a scheme was launched by the Waikato River Authority to attract investment in $100 million of hybrid bonds to convert up to 18 dairy farms on 6,539 ha (16,160 acres), or roughly 5% of the catchment, to organic farms, with the aim of reducing pollution from the worst farms by about 45%.

== Bridges ==
Listed in order from the confluence with the Waikato and moving south they are:-

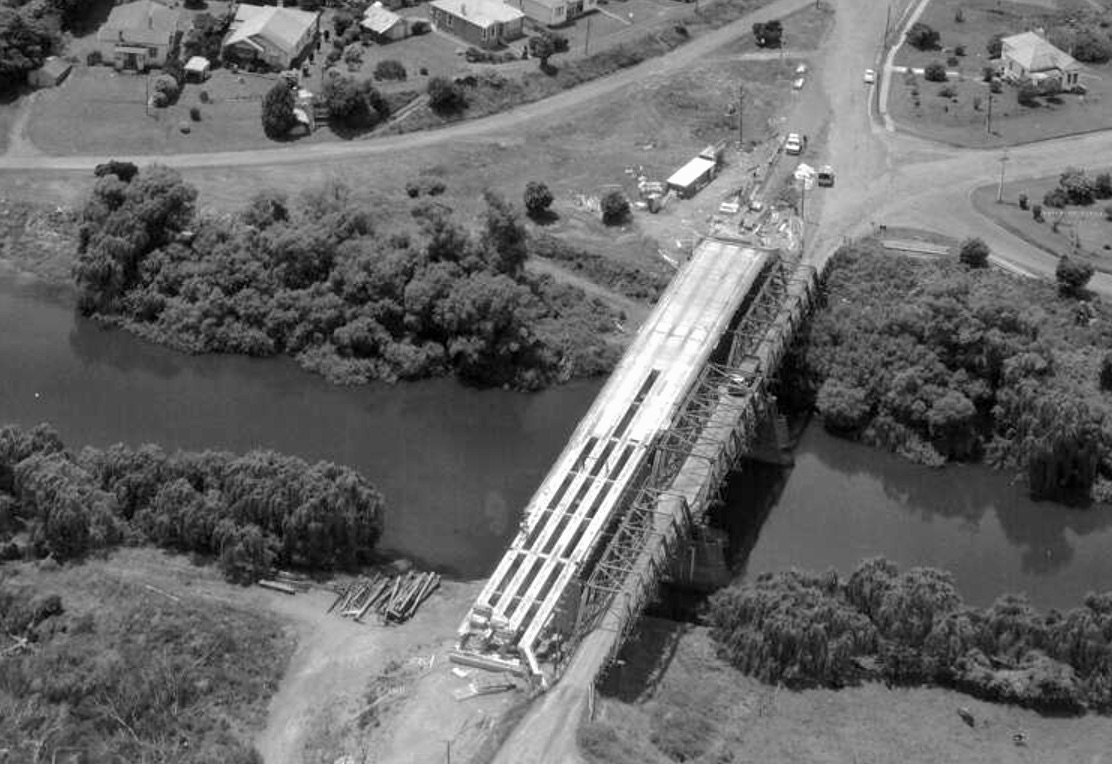
1974 Waipā bridge at Ngāruawāhia under construction in 1972

- 1898 Ngāruawāhia bridge opened. Collapsed under a herd of cattle 20 December 1916 (see 1917 photo) and rebuilt in 1922 with three 110 ft (34 m) trusses. The bridges were preceded by a punt (see 1922 photo), supplied by the government in 1887. A new bridge was opened on 18 January 1974.
- 1914–1958 Waipā Railway and Coal Co. 21 metres (70 ft) long bridge.
- 1881 (20 April) Whatawhata bridge replaced a punt, which had operated from 1867. It was originally wooden and 160 m (520 ft) long and 15 ft (4.6 m) above high water mark, consisted of two spans of 24 m (80 ft), 7 of 40 and 4 of 6.1 m (20 ft), and cost £3700. Repairs were done in 1909, but it was in poor repair again by 1917. For £11,250 a new wooden truss bridge was built over the top of it in 1924 and finished in 1925. The contract for the piles for the current SH23 concrete bridge was agreed at $27,056 in 1968. It is south of the original site and was shown on the 1974 edition of the 1 inch Lands & Survey map, but not on the 1965 3rd edition. Records of the road structure show it dates from 1971, and the aerial photo below shows the final segments of the arches still to be built in April 1971.
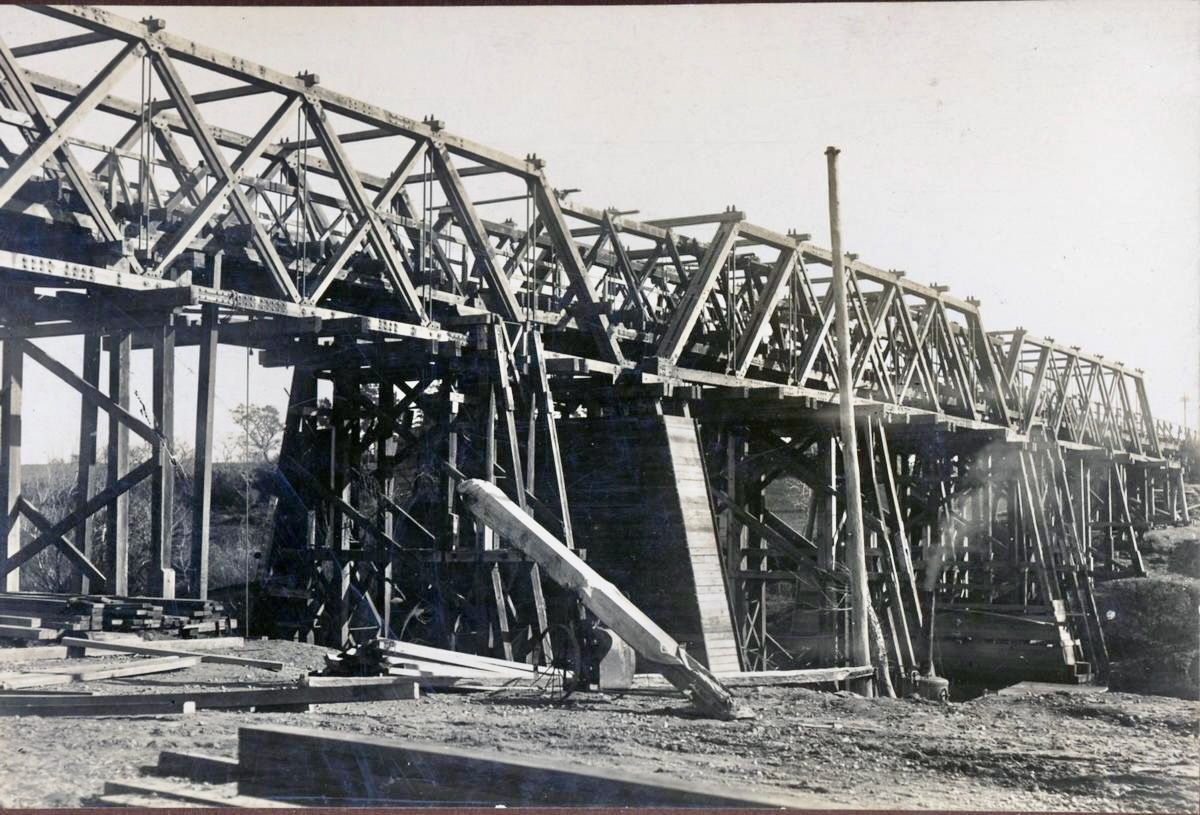
1924 Whatawhata rebuilding

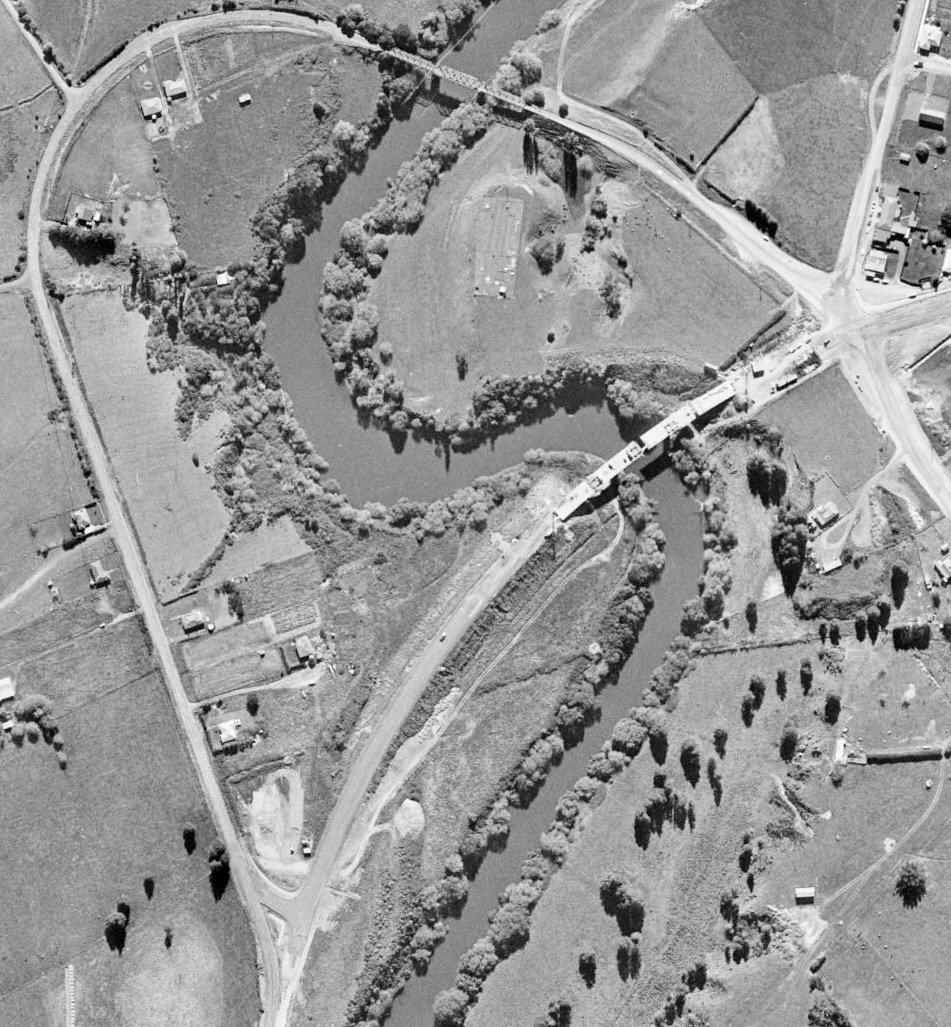
Whatawhata bridges in April 1971

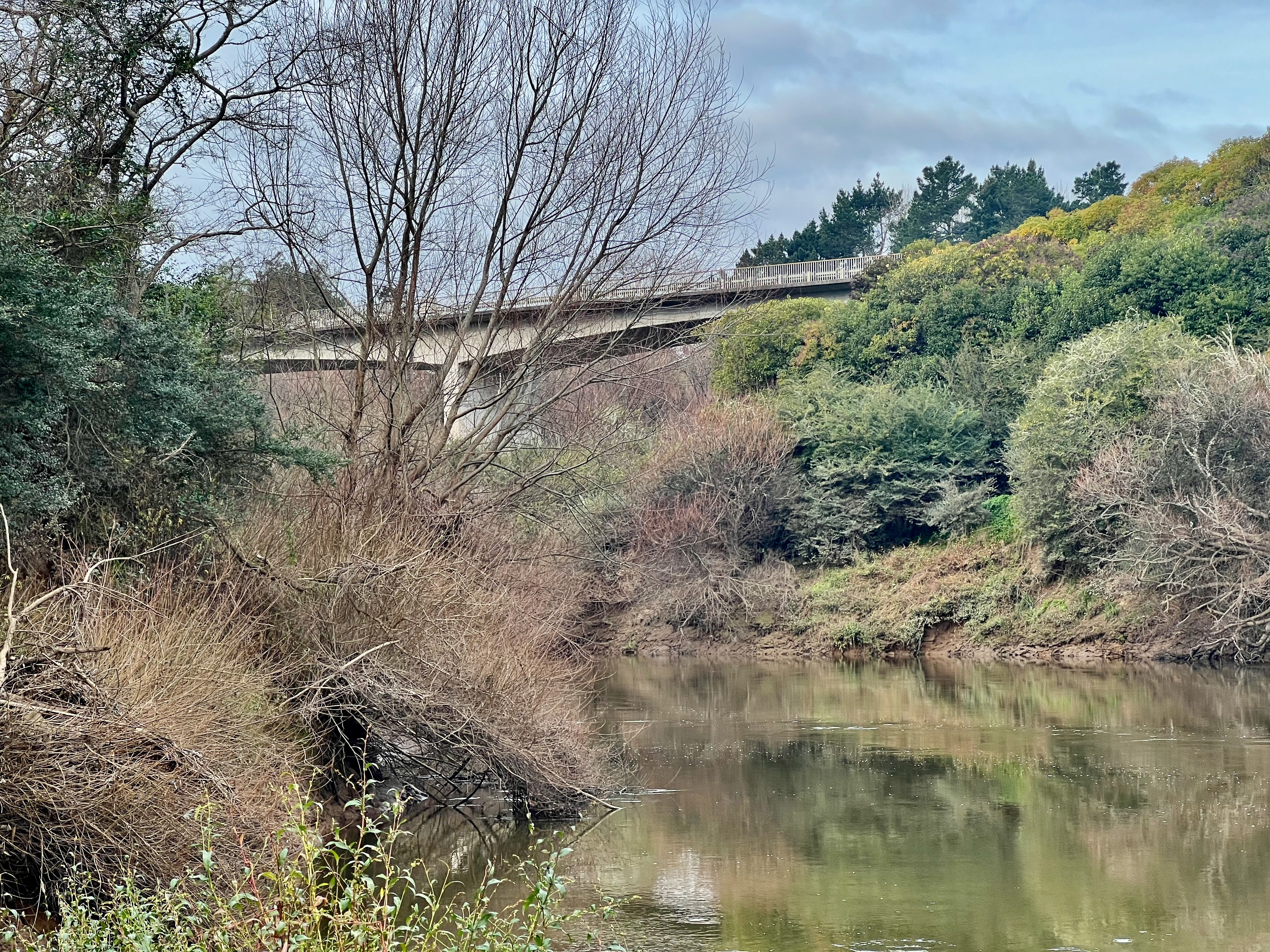
Whatawhata bridge in 2026

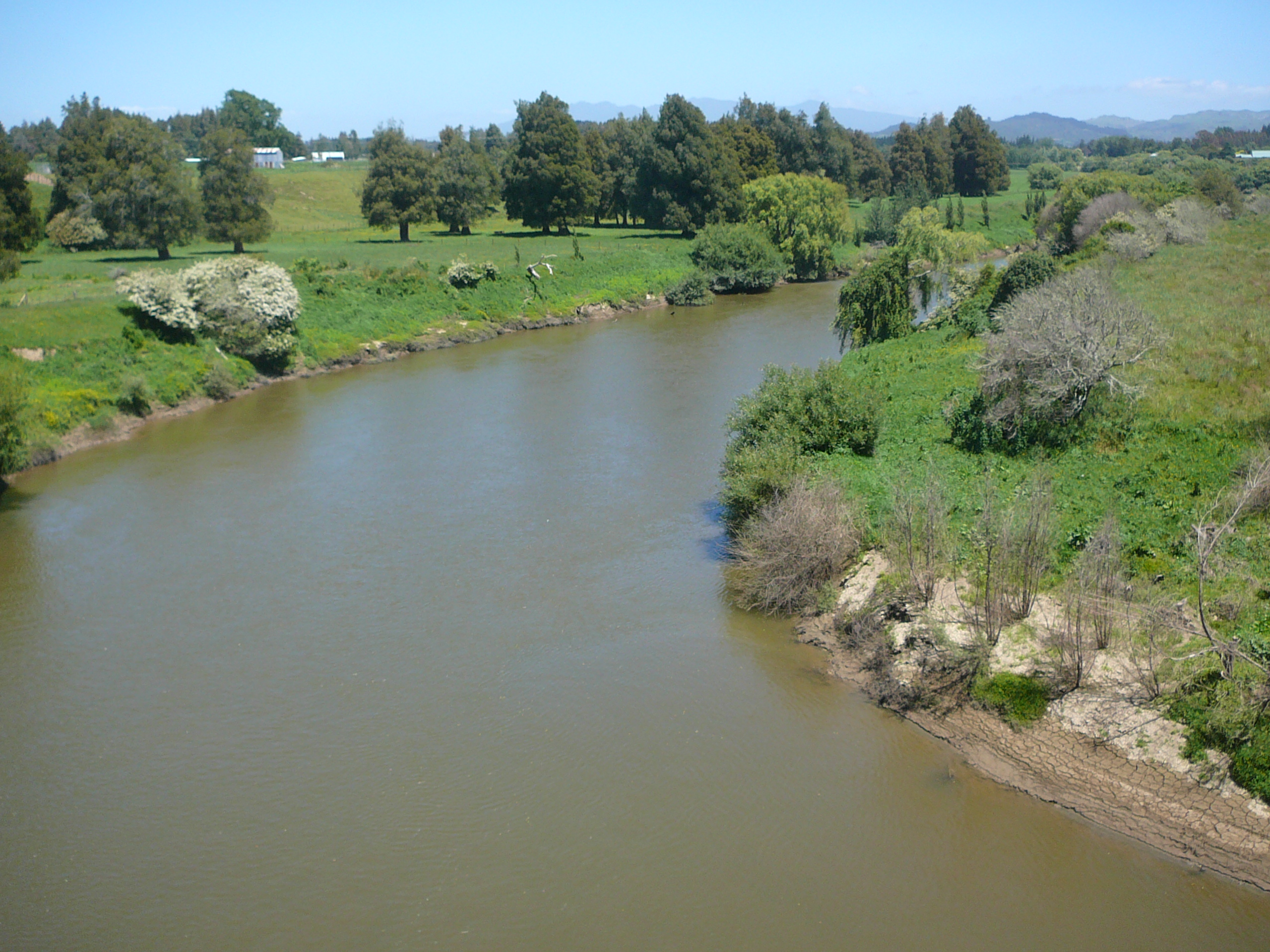
Looking south from Whatawhata bridge

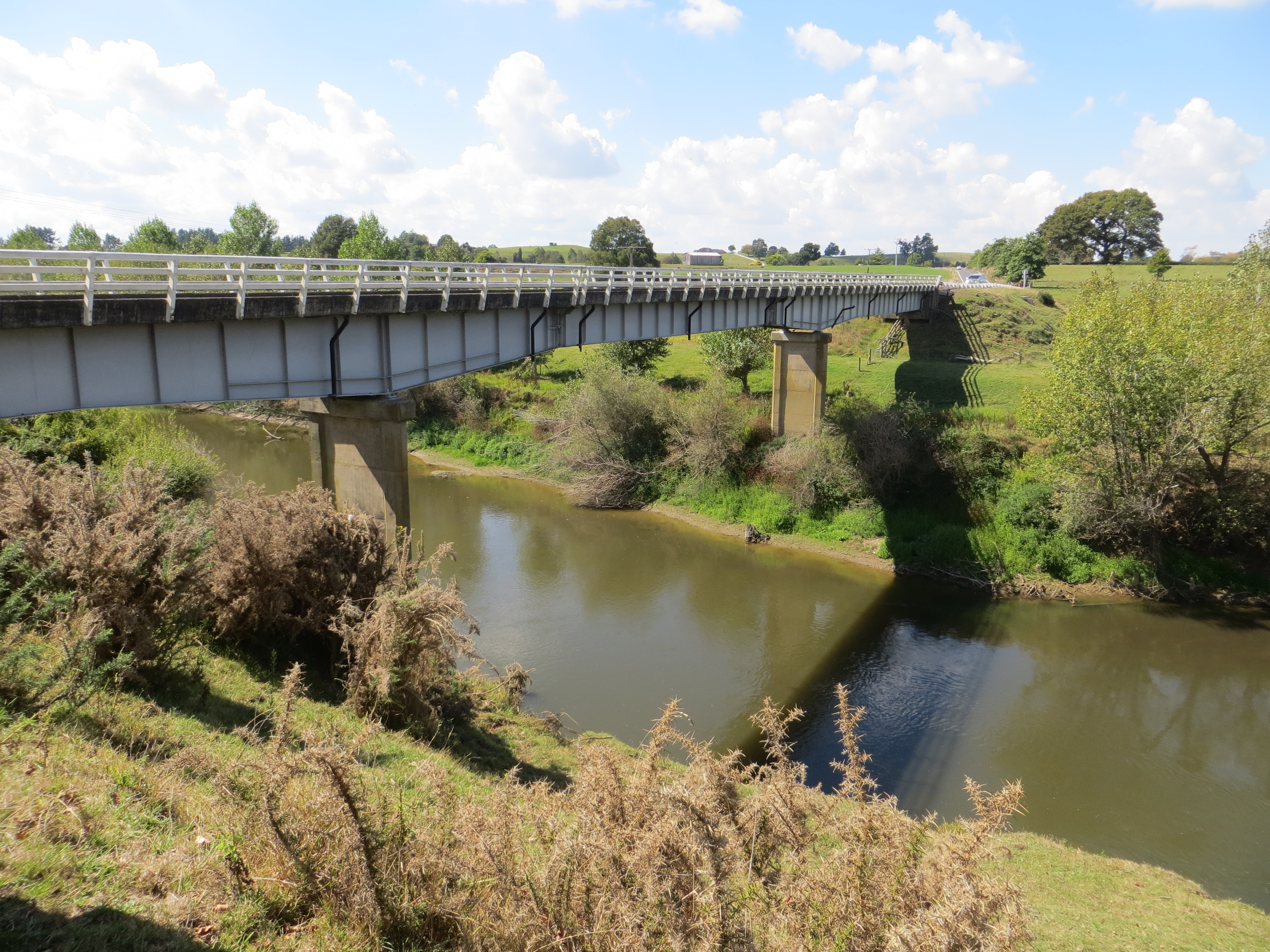
Te Rore bridge from south
- 1881 (12 August – see photo) 120-metre (400 ft) long Te Rore bridge. Replaced 1957. In 1905, 1907 and 1958, the bridge was flooded to the handrails.
- 1865 (about) Alexandra Bridge, Baffin St, Pirongia, originally built by the army. Pukehoua Bridge was built 600 m (660 yd) upstream in 1912–13 to replace the 1865 bridge, which was damaged by floods and by 1909 was only fit for pedestrians and light traffic. Public Works Department estimated its cost at £4,500, £1,500 coming from Government and £3,000 from Waipā (50%), Raglan (30%) and Waitomo (20%) councils.
- 1882 Alexandra Bridge, McClure St, Whatiwhatihoe, Pirongia."Mr. Wright has superintended the construction of the Alexandra Bridge, over the Waipā River, to give access to Tāwhiao's new settlement, Whatiwhatihoe (see map), and which will at the same time eventually be on the main line leading into the King country. The bridge will be open now in a fortnights' time, it consists of six 7.3 m (24 ft) spans, and three 12 m (40 ft) trusses, a total length of 80 m (264 ft), the height being 13 m (42 ft) above ordinary river level. The approaches and about a mile of road, and a large culvert have been made by Mr. Wright, with Maori labor. The whole will have been completed at a cost of about £1,800." There was a plan to replace it in 1939. SH39 now crosses on a 112.8-metre-long (370 ft) 1953 bridge.
- 1915 Te Kawa Rd bridge 100 metres (340 ft) long, 12 metres (40 ft) high.
- Kawhia Rd, Ōtorohanga, SH31/SH39 cross on a 147.5-metre-long (484 ft) 1964 bridge.
- Maniapoto St, Ōtorohanga photo about 1910 SH3 now crosses on a 51.8-metre-long (170 ft) 1964 bridge. It replaced a bridge built in the early 1950s.
- 1887 North Island Main Trunk railway bridge.
- 1928 Toa Bridge, Otewa Rd.

== Steamer services ==
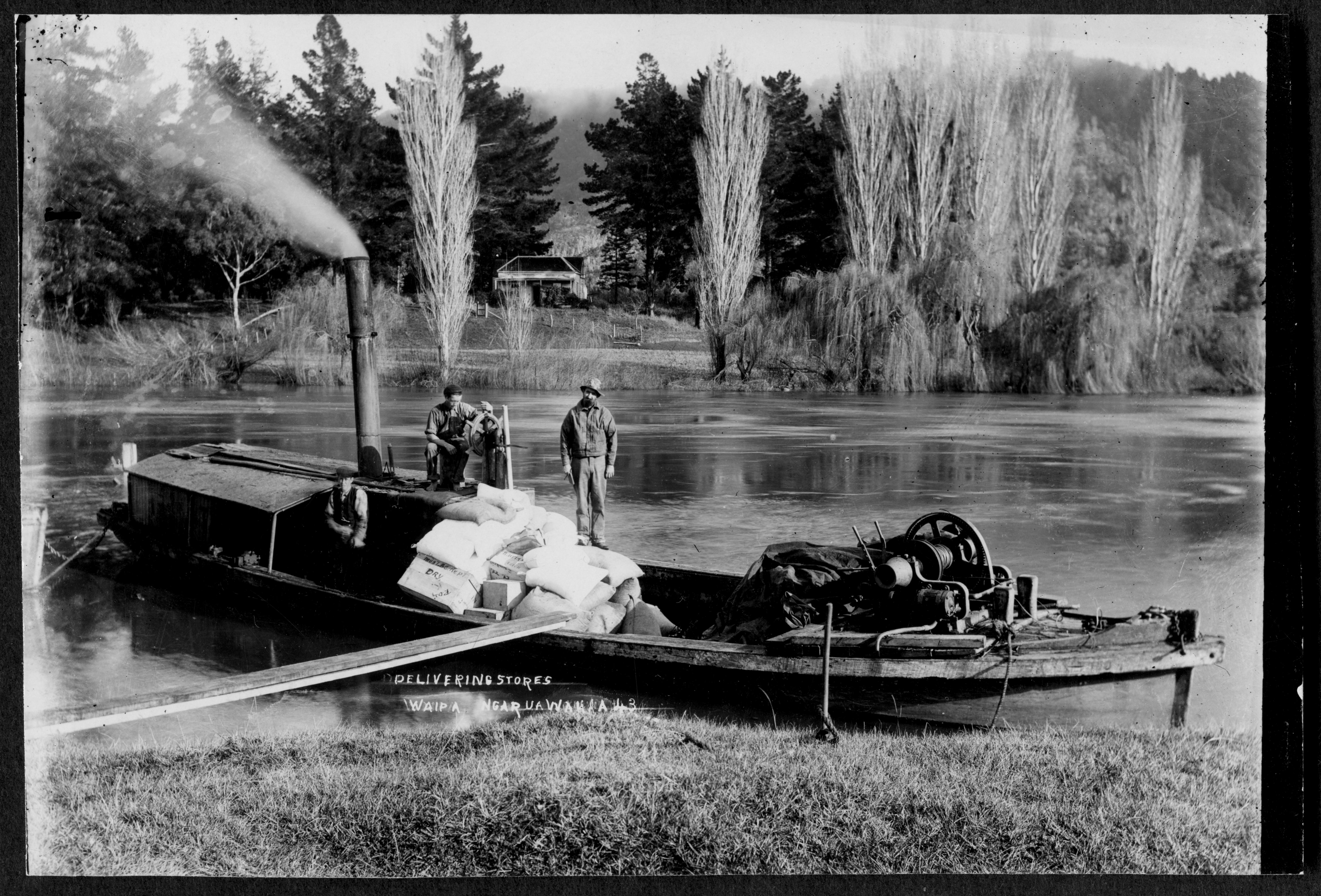
Delivering stores on the Waipā c1910

Over 50 kilometres (31 mi) was navigable by waka and Pirongia (Alexandra) was busy as the head of steamboat navigation until the railway was built to Te Awamutu in 1880, though some settlers used it as far as Te Kūiti, though possibly only as far as the confluence of the Mangapu and Mangaokewa streams, about 4 mi (6.4 km) upstream from Ōtorohanga. In 1885 the river was used to carry material for the railway construction as far as Te Kūiti, in barges about 35 ft (11 m) x 4 ft (1.2 m), and 22 in (560 mm) deep. Mr Gibbons' steamship, Lillie, started in 1876 to 1878. In 1895 Walsh Bros were running SS Victory. From 1902 to 1909 H H Gould ran the 1899 5 hp SS Opuatia from Ngāruawāhia to Whatawhata one day and on to Pirongia next day. A 1915 guidebook still said, "Small steamers ply up and down the river from Huntly". An 1881 article said a journey upriver would normally take 36 hours, but more in dry weather, when shoals at Whatawhata and Te Rore were hard to cross. An 1898 petition complained about wharfage charges at Mercer being a tax on residents along the Waipā. Around 1900 the Freetrader, owned by the Waikato Company, "was withdrawn owing to competition from the Walsh brothers with their launch Victory, which could traverse the winding Waipā much more easily than the cumbersome stern-wheeler."

As late as 1919 Waipā County Council pressed for removal of shingle shoals to permit navigation to Pirongia and got money for improvements from government and the county councils. Evidence given to the Inland Waterways Commission in 1921 said boats carrying 20 tons could reach Pirongia for most of the year and, up to about 30 years before, vessels carried 60 tons to Pirongia and a special fleet of steamers ran to Te Kūiti. Steamers were set back by the sinking of the Opuatia at Whatawhata in 1920. The Waikato Shipping Co had been running a weekly service to Pirongia with the former Waihou River steamer, SS Erin (and sometimes SS Excelsior), which seems to have continued until WSC stopped trading in 1922. A Public Works Department report in 1925 said the river was non-navigable above its junction with the Mangapu at Ōtorohanga.

== Settlements ==
Settlements near the river include Rangitoto, Ōtewā, Ōtorohanga, Pokuru, Puketōtara, Pirongia, Te Pahu, Te Rore, Ngāhinapōuri, Whatawhata, Te Kowhai, Ngāruawāhia.
