= Mangapu River =

Coordinates: 38.193537°S 175.203708°E

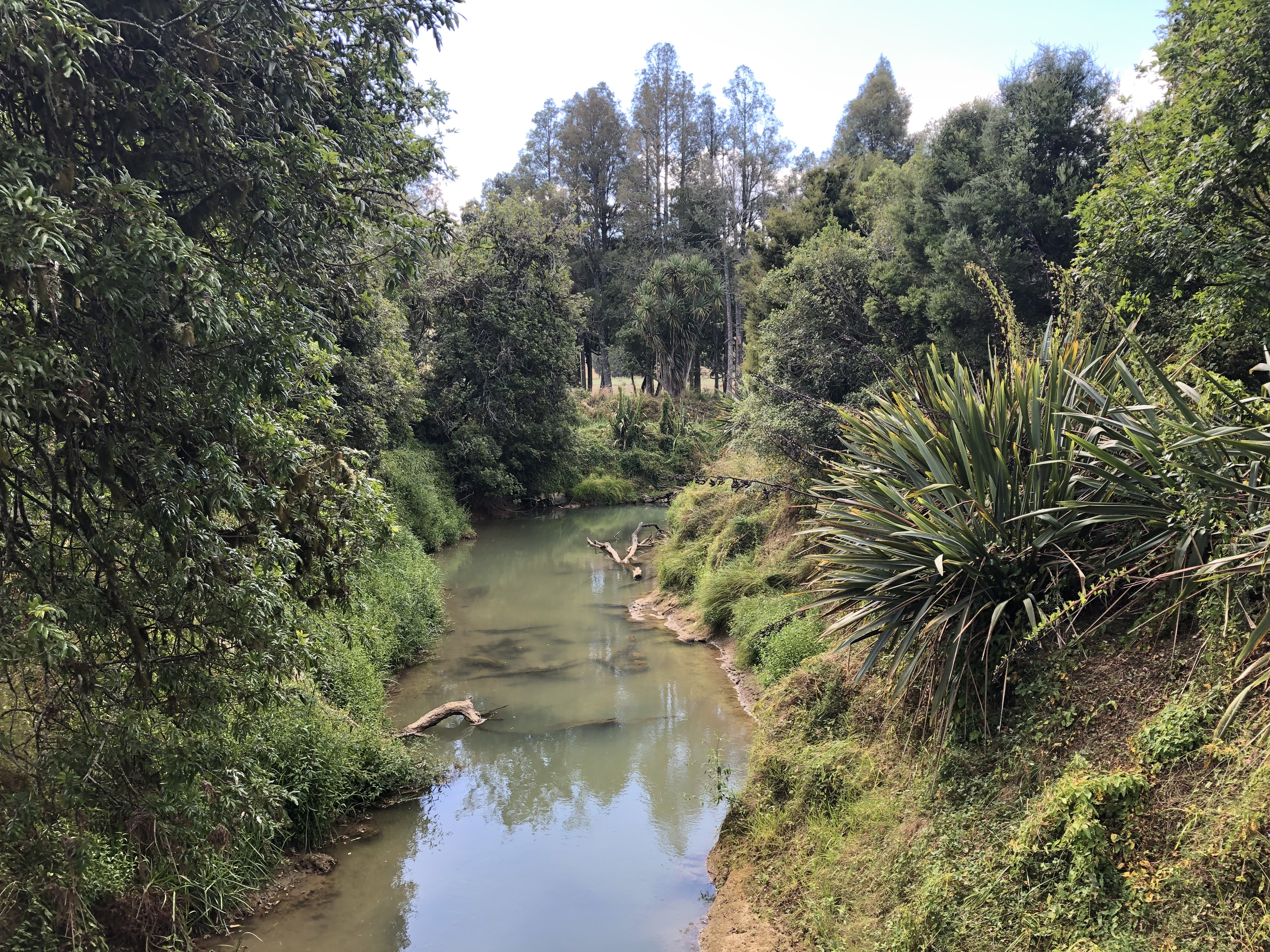
- Mangapu River from Pehitawa bridge

Location
- Country: New Zealand

Physical characteristics
- Mouth
  - location: Waipā River
- Length: 48 km (30 mi)

The Mangapu River is a river of the Waikato region of New Zealand's North Island. It has its sources in numerous streams which flow generally northwards from the King Country south of Te Kūiti, the longest of which is the Mangaokewa Stream. These streams join to form the Mangapu close to Te Kuiti, and from here the river flows north, passing close to the east of Waitomo Caves, where the Mangapu caves have the largest entrance in the North Island (about 100 m (330 ft) long and 90 m (300 ft) deep), before flowing into the Waipā River at Ōtorohanga.

The New Zealand Ministry for Culture and Heritage gives a translation of "double stream" for Mangapū.

SH3 crosses the river on a 111 m (364 ft) bridge near Ōtorohanga built in 1966 and near Hangatiki on a 41 m (135 ft) concrete bridge built in 1977. The railway follows the east bank for about 6 km (3.7 mi), crossing only small tributaries, though it did suffer from flooding, for example in 1905.

The river at Ōtorohanga is classed as being in the worst 25% of similar sites as regards all measured pollutants, though some attempts are being made at restoration.

== Pehitawa Kahikatea Forest Reserve ==
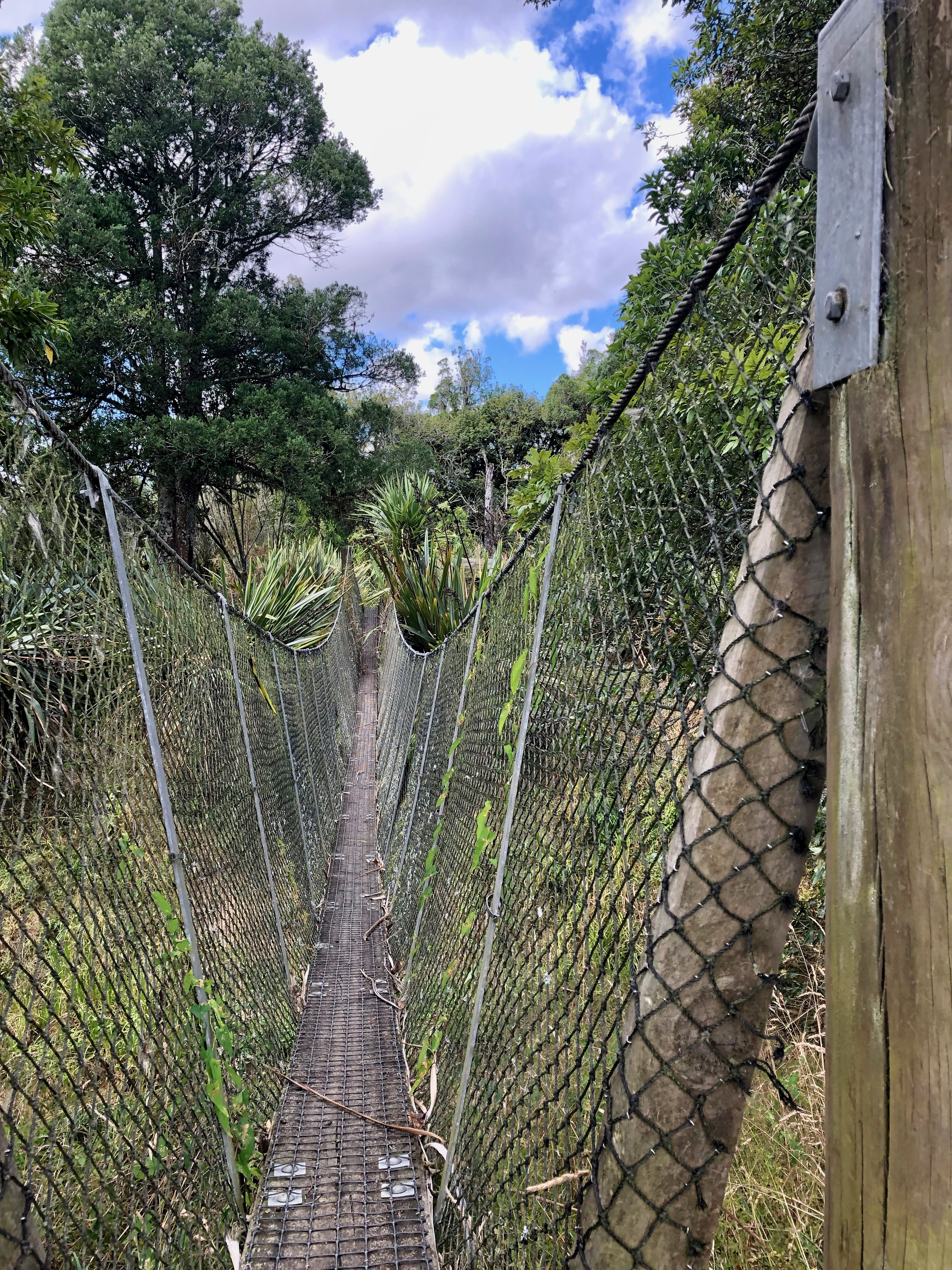
Pehitawa suspension bridge

The reserve 18.5 ha (46 acres) of kahikatea forest on the east bank of the river, was purchased by the Native Forests Restoration Trust in 2001. Kahikatea forest once covered 41,000 ha (100,000 acres) in the Waipa Ecological District, now reduced to 158 ha (390 acres), of which 52 ha (130 acres) are in the Mangapu valley, though over 70 ha (170 acres) has been felled since 1975. A major drainage scheme was carried out just upstream from the reserve in the 1930s, including emptying of a lake. The forest floods in winter and flood protection would be uneconomic. Some kahikatea in the reserve are about 120 years old. The reserve also has swamp maire, mataī, tītoki and pukatea. Te Araroa long-distance walkway passes through the reserve and crosses the river on a suspension bridge.

== See also ==
- List of rivers of New Zealand
