= Mangapiko Stream =

Stream in New Zealand

Coordinates: 37.9805°S 175.1944°E

The Mangapiko Stream is mostly a low-lying peat stream that flows through the heart of the Waipa district, Waikato. The stream begins near the summit of Mt Maungatautari and then weaves westward through low-lying dairy farmland and eventually becomes a tributary of the Waipā River in Pirongia.

The New Zealand Ministry for Culture and Heritage gives a translation of "winding stream" for Mangapiko.

The stream passes through Te Awamutu ("the river's end" in Maori) and meets with its main tributary, the Mangaohoe Stream, which also starts near the summit of Mt Maungatautari.

There are also two other streams in Waikato with the same name. One flows off the Kaimai to enter the Waihou to the east of Matamata. The other flows under Highway 22 to reach Lake Whangape via the Awaroa Stream.

== Flora ==
The stream starts in native bush on Mt Maungatautari and also passes near and through mature stands of low-lying native trees. Those trees mostly consist of tōtara and kahikatea, but there are also some broad-leaf natives in between. The largest group of trees the stream passes through can be seen while going over the Cambridge Rd. Bridge.

== Fauna ==
When kayaking or observing the stream, you can see koi carp along the edges or hiding in the side drains. There are also New Zealand longfin eel, ducks and many pūkeko.

== Environment ==
The Mangapiko stream has been tested by Environment Waikato by sampling the water quality at Bowman Rd. Results show that it had one of the worst scores out of all the streams tested in its zone.

There are currently local volunteer groups restoring the stream banks with native bushes and trees. Farmers have also replanted their stream banks to stop them collapsing. This restoration work can be seen by kayaking down the stream.

== Recreation ==
During most of the year the water level is high enough to kayak through, but in summer it can get a bit too low. With average water levels the stream can be kayaked from Rotoorangi Rd. Bridge to Te Rahu Rd. Bridge with two possible stopovers at Cambridge Rd. and Woodstock Rd. This journey goes past scattered native trees and through some blocks of native bush where no direct sunlight can get through. There is only one rapid to worry about which can easily topple over a kayaker. It is situated 10 seconds after the Woodstock Bridge. Due to being a low-lying stream, there is a very slow water flow. In many places of the stream there are willow trees blocking the way but are easy enough to push out of the way. The willow trees get very dense when entering the Te Awamutu area, and kayaking past them is impossible.
