= Pirongia =

Settlement in Waikato, New Zealand

- Village
- A view of Pirongia village, taken from the slopes of Mount Pirongia
- Interactive map of Pirongia
- Coordinates: 38°00′S 175°12′E
- Country: New Zealand
- Region: Waikato
- District: Waipā District
- Ward: Pirongia-Kakepuku General Ward
- Electorates: Taranaki-King Country; Hauraki-Waikato (Māori)

Government
  - Territorial Authority: Waipā District Council
  - Regional council: Waikato Regional Council
  - Mayor of Waipa: Mike Pettit
  - Taranaki-King Country MP: Barbara Kuriger
  - Hauraki-Waikato MP: Hana-Rawhiti Maipi-Clarke

Area
  - Territorial: 3.27 km^{2} (1.26 sq mi)

Population (June 2025)
  - Territorial: 1,360
  - Density: 416/km^{2} (1,080/sq mi)
- Time zone: UTC+12 (NZST)
  - Summer (DST): UTC+13 (NZDT)

Pirongia is a small town in the Waipā District of the Waikato region of New Zealand's North Island. It is 12 kilometres to the west of Te Awamutu, on the banks of the Waipā River, close to the foot of the 962 metre Mount Pirongia, which lies in Pirongia Forest Park to the west of the town.

Pirongia was originally named Alexandra, after the English Princess of Wales, but to avoid confusion with the town of that name in the South Island the name was changed to Pirongia. Some of the village's businesses and organisations such as the Alexandra Hotel and the Alexandra Racing Club retain the earlier name. Alexandra Racing Club, established in 1866 or 1872, was put into recess in 2019.

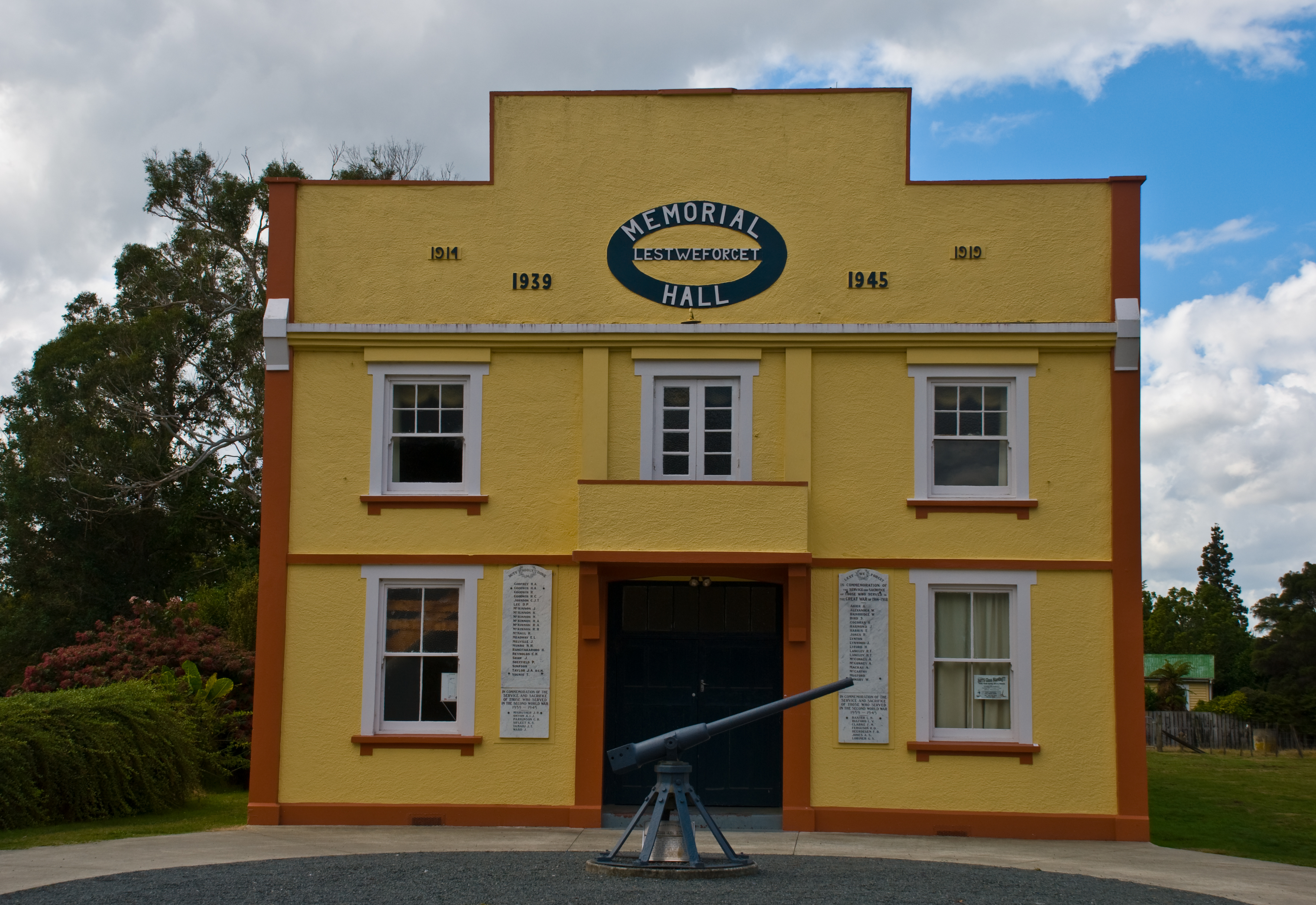
Pirongia War Memorial Hall

== History ==
=== Early history ===
At the northern end of the town, between the Waipā River and the Mangapiko Stream, is the site of Mātakitaki pā. This was the location of a Māori battle in May 1822 between invading musket-armed Ngāpuhi led by Hongi Hika and defending Waikato led by Pōtatau Te Wherowhero, during the musket wars.

Pirongia was sited where it is because of its proximity to the Aukati (the confiscation line along the Puniu River) and because in those days this was as far up the Waipā River that river steamers, supplying the new frontier settlements, could safely travel. As a result, Pirongia (Alexandra) was planned to be the hub servicing several redoubt settlements in the area. A large settlement was envisaged and 800 town sections were surveyed. Initially, there were two military redoubts here on the east and west sides of the river. These fell into disrepair and later the Alexandra Redoubt was constructed and manned by the Armed Constabulary. This later redoubt can be viewed on Bellot Street and the site of the military redoubt is on Aubin Close. The AC Redoubt is well preserved and is protected by the Historic Places Trust.

=== 19th century ===
Pirongia remained of strategic importance until 1881 when King Tāwhiao and his followers symbolically laid down their arms near the intersection of Crozier and Franklin Streets and declared peace, signalling an end to the armed conflict.

Initially, the settlement prospered. In its heyday of the mid-1870s, there were two hotels, a variety of shops, a bank, a blacksmith, a lending library, a school and later a creamery, mainly on Crozier and Franklin Streets.

However, the decision to route the main trunk railway via Te Awamutu, and the resulting gradual decline in the importance of river transport, together with the dispersal from the King Country of King Tāwhiao and his followers, meant that by the 1890s, Pirongia (Alexandra) was being superseded by Te Awamutu and other settlements on the railway line. One solution which was surveyed was a light railway, but an election in 1923 saw the scheme dropped. Many businesses moved to Te Awamutu or closed and the settlement gradually assumed the character of a small farming centre.

=== Modern history ===
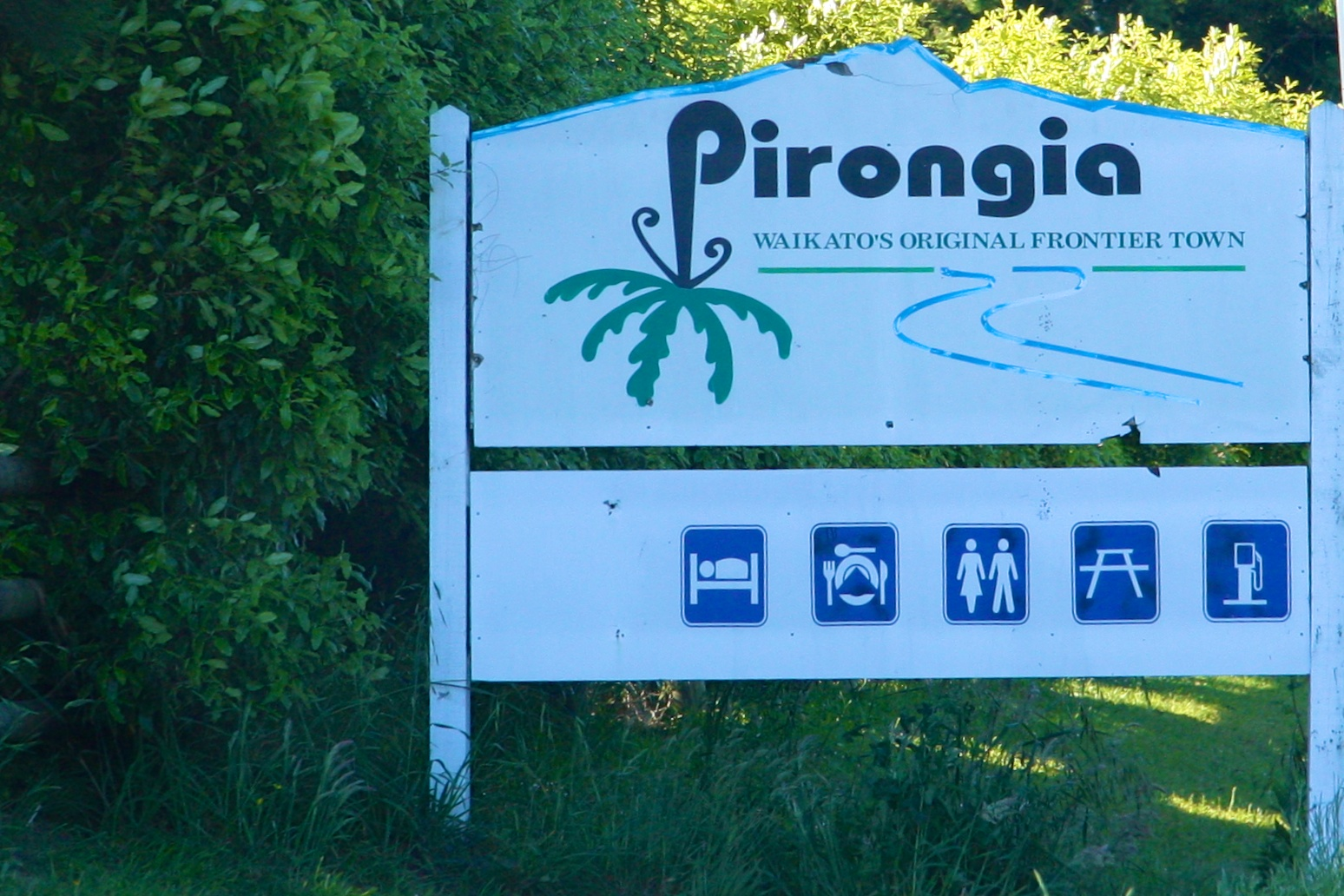
Pirongia tourist sign

The village has experienced rapid population growth since the 1980s as city-dwellers seeking a rural lifestyle have migrated to Pirongia. This has changed the town's character from rural to suburban in a short period of time.

Pirongia has a rural fire force located in the village to protect native bush in the area. The rural fire force has a specialised off-road appliance designed for tough off-road terrain.

Pirongia Rugby Club has strong teams in the Waikato competition.

Pirongia is also home to Pirongia Clydesdale horses regularly seen at public events throughout the countryside.

The Pirongia Heritage and Information Centre (Te Whare Taonga O Ngaa Rohe o Arekahana) "Pirongia Heritage and Information Centre website". has displays and items of historical interest and is located on Franklin Street in the centre of the village.

The local Pūrekireki Marae is a meeting place for the Ngāti Maniapoto hapū of Apakura and Hikairo, and the Waikato Tainui hapū of Apakura. It includes the Marutehiakina meeting house.

== Demographics ==
Stats NZ describes Pirongia as a small urban area, which covers 3.27 km^{2} (1.26 sq mi). It had an estimated population of 1,360 as of June 2025, with a population density of 416 people per km^{2}.

Historical population
Year	Pop.	±% p.a.
2006	1,047	—
2013	1,122	+0.99%
2018	1,224	+1.76%
2023	1,281	+0.91%

Pirongia had a population of 1,281 in the 2023 New Zealand census, an increase of 57 people (4.7%) since the 2018 census, and an increase of 159 people (14.2%) since the 2013 census. There were 636 males and 645 females in 468 dwellings. 1.2% of people identified as LGBTIQ+. The median age was 44.3 years (compared with 38.1 years nationally). There were 261 people (20.4%) aged under 15 years, 147 (11.5%) aged 15 to 29, 612 (47.8%) aged 30 to 64, and 264 (20.6%) aged 65 or older.

People could identify as more than one ethnicity. The results were 91.1% European (Pākehā); 12.6% Māori; 2.1% Pasifika; 2.1% Asian; 0.7% Middle Eastern, Latin American and African New Zealanders (MELAA); and 4.2% other, which includes people giving their ethnicity as "New Zealander". English was spoken by 97.9%, Māori language by 2.6%, Samoan by 0.2%, and other languages by 6.1%. No language could be spoken by 2.1% (e.g. too young to talk). New Zealand Sign Language was known by 0.7%. The percentage of people born overseas was 17.8, compared with 28.8% nationally.

Religious affiliations were 25.5% Christian, 0.2% Hindu, 0.5% Māori religious beliefs, 0.5% New Age, and 0.7% other religions. People who answered that they had no religion were 63.7%, and 9.1% of people did not answer the census question.

Of those at least 15 years old, 249 (24.4%) people had a bachelor's or higher degree, 582 (57.1%) had a post-high school certificate or diploma, and 186 (18.2%) people exclusively held high school qualifications. The median income was $44,500, compared with $41,500 nationally. 150 people (14.7%) earned over $100,000 compared to 12.1% nationally. The employment status of those at least 15 was that 516 (50.6%) people were employed full-time, 162 (15.9%) were part-time, and 12 (1.2%) were unemployed.

== Education ==
Pirongia School is a co-educational state primary school, with a roll of 361 as of July 2026. The school was founded in 1873.
