= Waipā District =

- Territorial authority district
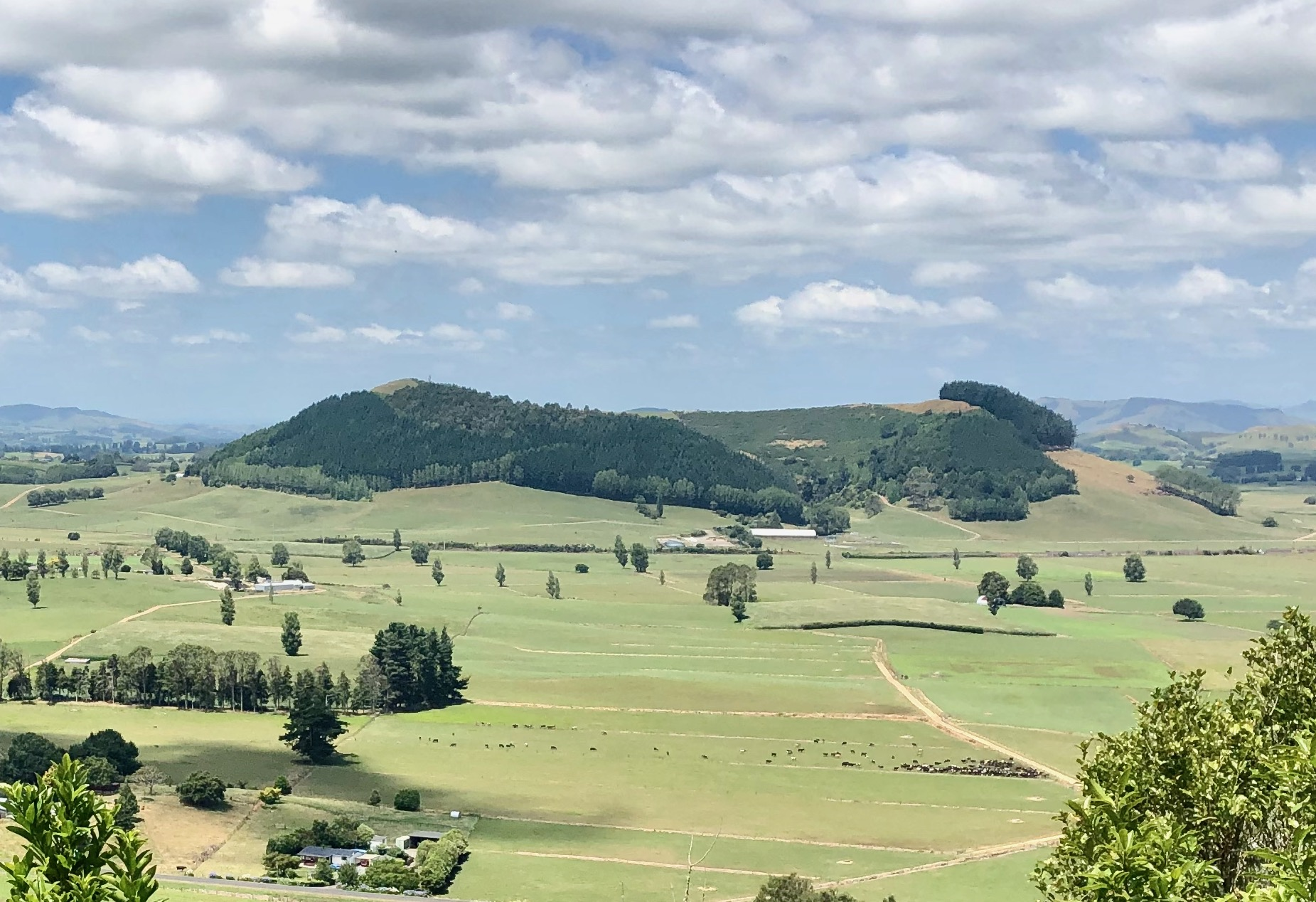
- Te Kawa from Kakepuku

- Waipā district within the North Island
- Coordinates: 38°00′37″S 175°19′33″E
- Country: New Zealand
- Region: Waikato
- Wards: Te Awamutu-Kihikihi; Cambridge; Pirongia-Kakepuku; Maungatautari; Waipā (Māori)
- Seat: Te Awamutu

Government
  - Mayor: Mike Pettit
  - Territorial authority: Waipa District Council

Area
  - Land: 1,470.08 km^{2} (567.60 sq mi)

Population (June 2025)
  - Territorial: 62,200
  - Density: 42.3/km^{2} (110/sq mi)
- Postcode(s): Map of postcodes
- Area code: 07
- Website: Waipa District Council

Waipā District (or Waipa District) is a municipality in the Waikato region of New Zealand that is administered by the Waipā District Council. Its most populous town is Cambridge. The seat of the council is at the second most populous town, Te Awamutu. The district is south and south-east of the city of Hamilton. It has five wards: Te Awamutu, Cambridge, Pirongia, Maungatautari and Kakepuku.

Although the official name remains Waipa District, the council sought in 2020 a simpler means of changing to Waipā District, which is the orthographic form it uses.

== History ==
The District was formed from Waipa County Council and its town boroughs in 1989. The county boundaries have varied since five ridings were formed in Waipa county in 1876: Newcastle, Hamilton, Mangapiko North and South, Rangiaowhia, and Pukekura. In 1902, it covered 282 mi^{2} (730 km^{2}) and had an additional riding, Tuhikaramea.

In 1923, Waipa County covered 429 mi^{2} (1,110 km^{2}) and had a population of 9,275, with 283 mi (455 km) of gravel roads, 506 mi (814 km) of mud roads and 153 mi (246 km) of tracks.

== Geography ==
The Waikato River forms much of the eastern boundary of the district, before it flows north-westward through the district, past Cambridge. The Waipā River, the Waikato River's main tributary, flows northwards through the western part of the district; the two rivers meet outside the district. The highest mountains are Mount Pirongia in the west and Maungatautari in the east.

The region's economy is based largely on dairy farming and cereal production. The southeastern corner of the district includes the hydroelectric project at Karāpiro.

== Demographics ==
Waipā District covers 1,470.08 km^{2} (567.60 sq mi) and had an estimated population of 62,200 as of June 2025, with a population density of 42 people per km^{2}. 22,700 people live in Cambridge and 13,950 in Te Awamutu.

Historical population
Year	Pop.	±% p.a.
2006	42,501	—
2013	46,668	+1.35%
2018	53,241	+2.67%
2023	58,686	+1.97%

Waipā District had a population of 58,686 in the 2023 New Zealand census, an increase of 5,445 people (10.2%) since the 2018 census, and an increase of 12,018 people (25.8%) since the 2013 census. There were 28,620 males, 29,886 females and 177 people of other genders in 21,795 dwellings. 2.4% of people identified as LGBTIQ+. The median age was 40.9 years (compared with 38.1 years nationally). There were 11,751 people (20.0%) aged under 15 years, 9,651 (16.4%) aged 15 to 29, 25,896 (44.1%) aged 30 to 64, and 11,388 (19.4%) aged 65 or older.

People could identify as more than one ethnicity. The results were 86.5% European (Pākehā); 15.9% Māori; 2.3% Pasifika; 6.1% Asian; 0.7% Middle Eastern, Latin American and African New Zealanders (MELAA); and 2.5% other, which includes people giving their ethnicity as "New Zealander". English was spoken by 97.2%, Māori language by 3.4%, Samoan by 0.2% and other languages by 8.4%. No language could be spoken by 2.1% (e.g. too young to talk). New Zealand Sign Language was known by 0.4%. The percentage of people born overseas was 19.9, compared with 28.8% nationally.

Religious affiliations were 32.2% Christian, 0.9% Hindu, 0.3% Islam, 0.8% Māori religious beliefs, 0.5% Buddhist, 0.4% New Age, 0.1% Jewish, and 1.5% other religions. People who answered that they had no religion were 55.7%, and 7.8% of people did not answer the census question.

Of those at least 15 years old, 7,965 (17.0%) people had a bachelor's or higher degree, 25,443 (54.2%) had a post-high school certificate or diploma, and 10,878 (23.2%) people exclusively held high school qualifications. The median income was $45,200, compared with $41,500 nationally. 6,432 people (13.7%) earned over $100,000 compared to 12.1% nationally. The employment status of those at least 15 was that 24,564 (52.3%) people were employed full-time, 6,645 (14.2%) were part-time, and 891 (1.9%) were unemployed.

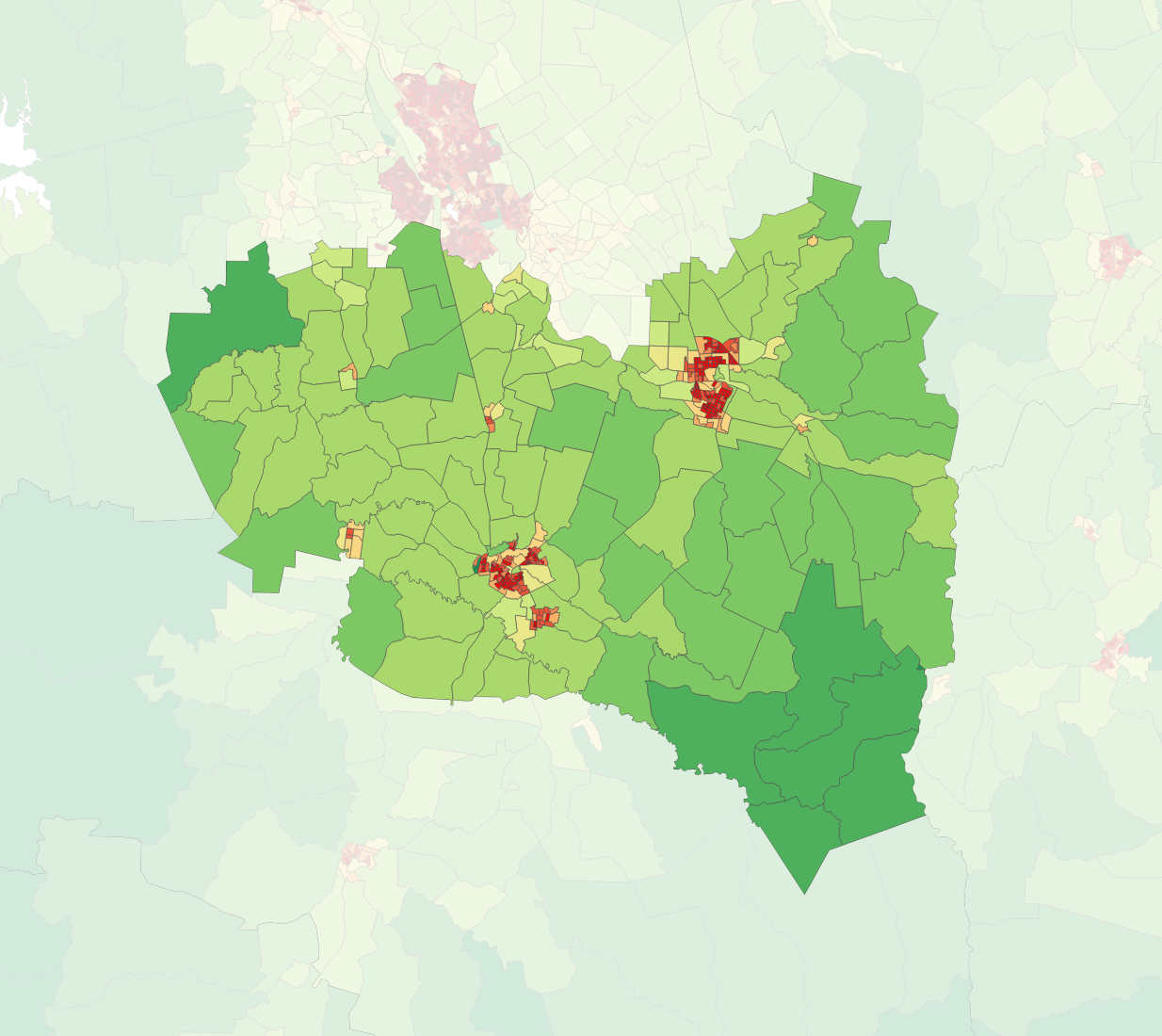
Population density in the 2023 census

Individual wards
Name	Area (km^{2})	Population	Density (per km^{2})	Dwellings	Median age	Median income
Pirongia-Kakepuku General Ward	860.64	12,549	14.6	4,386	39.7 years	$50,500
Cambridge General Ward	83.33	23,556	282.7	9,009	43.2 years	$43,600
Maungatautari General Ward	471.96	5,229	11.1	1,869	40.7 years	$52,200
Te Awamutu-Kihikihi General Ward	54.15	17,352	320.4	6,534	39.0 years	$41,800
New Zealand					38.1 years	$41,500
