= Te Uenuku =

Māori carving

Te Uenuku, or simply Uenuku, is an early Māori carving stored (but not displayed) at Te Awamutu Museum in the North Island of New Zealand. Te Uenuku (literally "The Rainbow") represents Uenuku, a tribal atua of war who manifests as a rainbow. The taonga is of extreme significance both to the local Tainui people and also for its archaeological value.

It is 2.7 metres in height and consists of a simple upright post, the top of which has been carved into a spiral form. From the top of this spiral emerge four waving verticals, reminiscent of the teeth of a comb. The form, though seemingly simple, often causes a powerful reaction in viewers of the artifact. In appearance the carving is very striking and different from the style of carving seen in the later Classic period.

Because of the carving's spiritual and cultural significance, photographs are prohibited without the permission of the Māori sovereign. One must seek further written permission to publish the photos anywhere, which is more likely to be granted if the sovereign deems it to be for the nation's interest. Similarly, while the form of Te Uenuku is a popular motif for New Zealand artists, they must still exercise care in its use because of its sacred significance. It is used in stylised form as the logo of the Māori Broadcasting Agency Te Māngai Pāho.

== History ==
The carving is unique in form, and bears a noted resemblance to Hawaiian carving styles. Tainui tradition would suggest that it dates from circa 1400 CE, an era known to New Zealand ethnologists as Te Tipunga or Archaic period. Tradition goes on to say that the spirit now inhabiting the carving originated from Hawaiki, brought over on the Tainui canoe inside a stone, which was later placed inside the spiral at the top of the carving. Recent work by the museum has shown that it is made from tōtara, a common native New Zealand hard wood.

According to Māori verbal history, around the year 1807 the Waipa District of the Waikato was invaded by a strong force led by Ngāti Toa chief Pikauterangi. In the Battle of Hingakākā between Tainui and Ngāti Maniapoto warriors close to Lake Ngaroto, the sacred carving of Te Uenuku was lost.

The carving was found buried close to the lake's shore in 1906 when a farmer was draining swampland, and spent some time in the R.W. Bourne collection before being acquired by the Te Awamutu Museum.

The work was the centrepiece of the Te Maori exhibition which toured North America and New Zealand in the early to mid-1980s.
