= Battle of Hingakaka =

Major battle between two Maori coalitions c. 1807

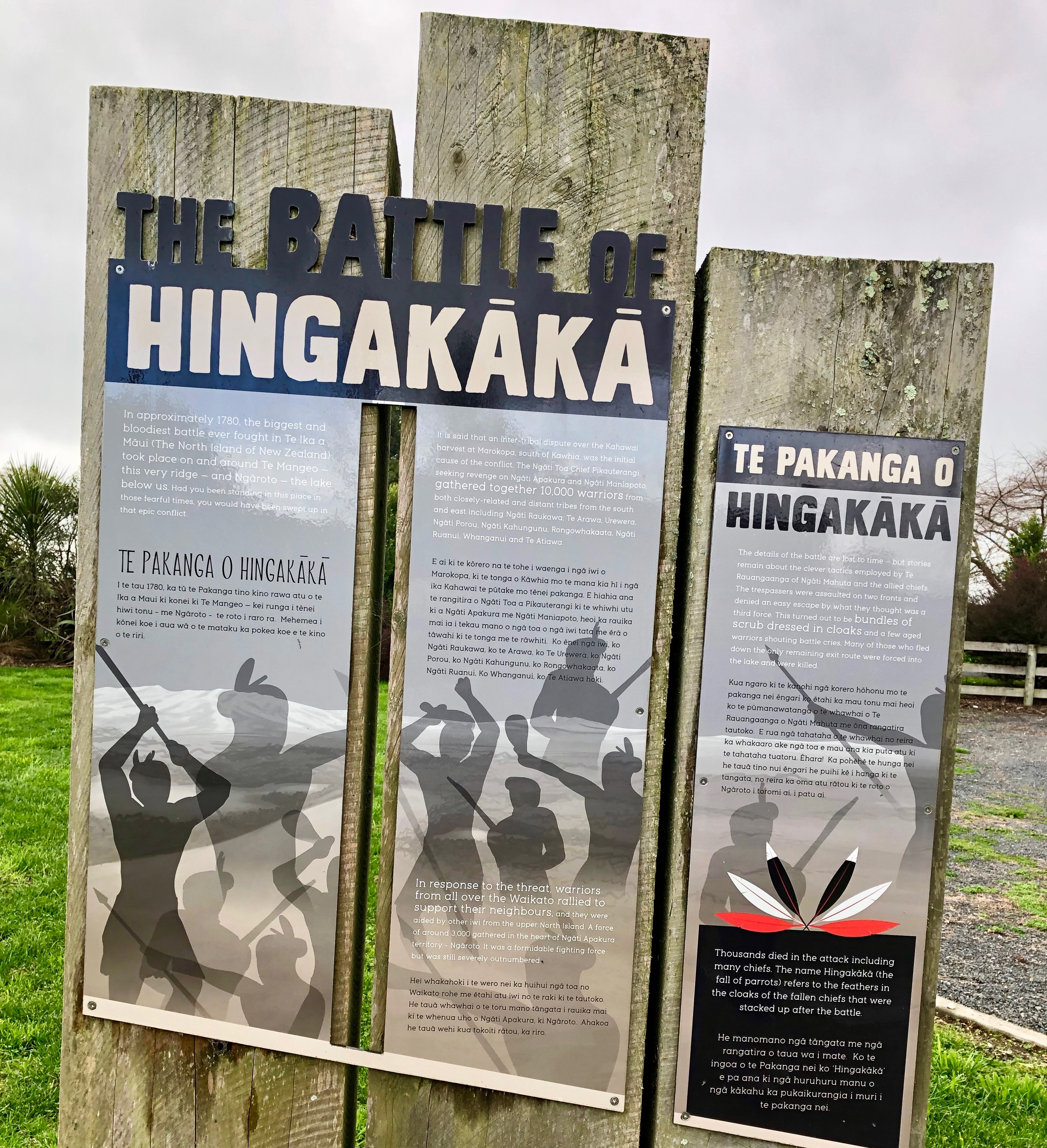
- "Battle of Hingakākā" information board at Yarndley's Bush car park
Date	c. 1807
Location	Near Te Awamutu 37.9807°S 175.3085°E
Result	Waikato–Maniapoto victory

Belligerents
Ngāti Toa, Raukawa and allies from south and east	Waikato–Maniapoto–Whātua–Hauraki

Commanders and leaders
Pikauterangi †	Te Rauangaanga; Huahua; Tiripa

The Battle of Hingakaka was fought between two Māori armies of the North Island near Te Awamutu and Ōhaupō in the Waikato, probably in about 1807. It was the largest battle ever fought in New Zealand. The attacking army consisted of Ngāti Toa, Ngāti Raukawa and allied tribes from the west coast south of the Waikato, the southern North Island and the east coast. The defending army consisted of Waikato and Ngāti Maniapoto, with support from Ngāti Whātua and Hauraki. The attackers had between 7,000 and 10,000 warriors, greatly outnumbering the defenders with 3,000 warriors, but the defenders, led by Waikato chief Te Rauangaanga, won the battle.

== Date ==
Early historian Percy Smith placed the battle at about 1780, basing the date purely on tribal genealogies, but evidence from Maori oral histories from warriors who fought in the battle and were still alive well after contact with Europeans suggests that 1780 is far too early. The Ngāti Whātua chief Murupaenga, who led his warriors into action in the battle, was judged by Samuel Marsden to be about 50 when he saw him in 1820. A date of 1780 would make him about 10 – far too young to be a leader of warriors. An account by Noka Hukanui said that the battle of Hingakaka occurred just before the battle of Moremonui, which took place two years before the attack on the Boyd in December 1809. Moremonui is therefore dated to 1807 or 1808, and Hingakaka about the same.

== Origin of the war ==
The take, or cause, happened about three years before the battle. Pikauterangi, a chief of Ngāti Toa from the Marokopa district, was aggrieved over the poor distribution of the kahawai fish harvest, according to Pei Te Hurinui Jones. Other accounts say that Pikauterangi took the biggest fish for himself and he was seized and dunked to the point where he nearly drowned. In vengeance, he killed members of the Ngāti Apakura, who were one of the hapu hosting the fish feast, cooked their bodies and distributed them for eating among Ngāti Kauwhata and Ngāti Raukawa.

== Preparations ==
Pikauterangi then travelled around the lower North Island collecting a large force from many smaller allied hapū and iwi. He raised about 4,000 men from the Wellington region and 3,000 from the East Coast tribes of Ngāti Porou and Ngāti Kahungunu. This was combined with a separate force of Te Āti Awa, Ngāti Ruanui and tribes from the Whanganui who had previously fought with Ngāti Maniapoto.

In response, Ngāti Maniapoto and the Waikato tribes allied with Ngāti Whātua and Hauraki hapū. The alliance made preparations to establish a series of warning systems stretching from Kakepuku mountain to Mount Taupiri to alert the Waikato–Maniapoto forces of impending invasion, and a battle strategy to repel and defeat the invading forces of Pikauterangi, and constructed a series of pā pahū (pā equipped with warning devices):

- Mangatoatoa pā, on the Puniu River just below Kakepuku mountain, the assembly point for Waikato–Maniapoto
- Waiari pā, on the Mangapiko Stream
- Nukuhau pā, on the banks of the Waikato River near the Narrows
- Maniapoto pā, in the Gordonton district
- Taupiri pā at Taupiri, on the banks of the Waikato River.

When alerted by Ngāti Maniapoto of impending attack or invasion by external forces the Mangatoatoa pā alarm was sounded, which carried to Waiari pā, whose alarm was then sounded, and so on to Nukuhau, Maniapoto pā, and Taupiri, so that all of Waikato heard. On hearing the alarm, Waikato–Maniapoto would meet at Mangatoatoa as planned.

== Deployment and engagement ==
The attackers assembled at Ōtorohanga to invade the Waipā district. They numbered 7,000 to 10,000 warriors, probably the largest army ever assembled for battle in New Zealand before or since. Invaders were first spotted by Wahanui, a Maniapoto chief, just south of Ōtorohanga. He sent runners to the pā pahū at Mangatoatoa to raise the alarm and warn the Waikato–Maniapoto forces of the impending attack.

The day before the battle the two armies drew up before each other. The combined Whātua–Hauraki and Waikato–Maniapoto forces, realising their numbers were far fewer at about 1,600 (some sources say 3,000), arranged bunches of feathers on top of fern to simulate the head feathers of warriors held in reserve, while other chiefs made war-like speeches in the fern to imaginary warriors. Choosing to draw the invading force into ambush, the Waikato defenders chose Te Mangeo ridge line just south of Lake Ngaroto (and west of where the Ngaroto railway station was later).

Te Rauangaanga, the father of Te Wherowhero, placed his army on the high ground at the end of a narrow ridge in three groups. The invading force assembled at the foot of the spur (possibly near where the railway line is now). Huahua's Maniapoto forces attacked with their tactic "Te Kawau Maro" (swoop of the cormorant). They charged down the hill in a flying wedge into the centre of the invading force. The defenders reeled back, allowing the attackers to envelop them. The second group of the defending forces then rushed down the hill to hit the confused army of Pikauterangi in the flank. The turning point came when Pikauterangi was killed by a blow from Te Rauangaanga. In a panic the invaders tried to retreat along a narrow gap between the ridge and the lake but were ambushed by Tiriwa's men who had been waiting in the bush along the ridge. The Ngāti Toa were forced into the swamplands along the lake margin; some tried to swim the lake but were killed by patrols waiting on the far side.

Many thousands died in the attack. Pei Jones of Tainui says that 16,000 warriors are said to have taken part. Combatants included Waikato–Maniapoto, Ngāti Toa and Ngāti Raukawa. Ngāti Raukawa alone are said to have lost 1,600 warriors in battle, including two chiefs. Others came from Taranaki, from Kaipara in Northland, and as far east as Bay of Plenty and Hawke's Bay. The battle is known as Hingakaka, due to the large number of chiefs who died, though the exact pronunciation and meaning of the term is uncertain. One account collected by Jones says that it is Hinga-kākā, meaning 'fall of kākā' (Māori hunted kākā for food). According to an account by George Grey, it is Hīnga-kaka, meaning fish 'hauled up in the kind of net called kaka'.

The sacred carving Te Uenuku was lost in the carnage, and not recovered until 1906.

== Aftermath ==
The victorious Tainui warriors considered following up their decisive victory with a campaign against the tribes that had made war on them. However, Ngāti Whātua's tohunga had a dream in which he saw Ngāpuhi launching an attack on the Kaipara in their absence, so Ngāti Whātua returned home, where they defeated an attempted invasion by Ngāpuhi in the battle of Moremonui. Hikairo of Ngāti Apakura wanted to continue the war against Ngāti Raukawa, who had retreated to Maungatautari, but Waikato had had enough of fighting for the meantime. Ngāti Apakura set out after Ngāti Raukawa anyway, but were defeated, with Hikairo being killed.

In 1810 Waikato warriors set out down the west coast on a raid. At Rangikaiwaka on the coast they met a force of Ngāti Tama and a Ngāti Haua chief, Taiporutu, was killed. As a result of this another Waikato–Maniapoto war party set out to gain utu to punish Ngāti Tama. The avenging warriors were ambushed and defeated by Ngāti Tama and their chief Raparapa.

=== Battle of Motunui ===
Around 1819–20, during the Ngāti Toa migration southwards after being evicted from Kawhia by Waikato–Maniapoto after the Te Arawi battle, Apihai Te Kawau of Ngāti Whātua, Kukutai of Ngāti Tipa (Waikato), and Peehi Tukorehu of Ngāti Paretekawa (Maniapoto) embarked with some 400–500 distinguished warriors on the "Amio Whenua" expedition to seek retribution or utu from the tribes who had sought to invade their ancestral homelands in the Waipa and Waikato territories during the Hingakaka battle. After encircling the land from Waikato and Maungatautari to Te Arawa and Tuhoe, and through the Tai Rawhiti district to Te Mahia, then on to Wairarapa and across to Manawatu and Whanganui, the "ope taua" (war party) was eventually besieged by Te Āti Awa forces at Pukerangiora Pā, on the banks of the Waitara River, Taranaki. A large Waikato–Maniapoto force under Te Wherowhero, Te Hiakai, Mama, and others was raised to break the siege of Pukerangiora pā and free the "Amio Whenua Ope Taua" (Amio Whenua War Party). On the way, this relieving force passed near Okoki pā, where they met the Ngāti Toa under Te Rauparaha, with many Te Āti Awa warriors. The Ngāti Toa and Te Āti Awa were victorious in the battle of Motunui, but nevertheless the relieving force continued on to unite with the Amio Whenua War Party, and then returned without further fighting to their homelands at Waikato and Waipa.

This led to further conflict and was the immediate background to the Ngāti Toa forming alliances with Ngāti Tama and Ngāti Mutunga in the great Ngāti Toa upheaval of 1821–22. This attack in turn led to further attacks and counterattacks, building to a climax in 1831 when a large Waikato contingent alleged to be about 4,000 warriors carried out a brutal and sustained campaign over several years led by the great Waikato warrior Te Wherowhero. When women and children attempted to flee the Pukerangiora pā they were killed. When the men emerged in a weakened state many of them jumped over the cliff to avoid the Waikato warriors. The fugitives were tracked down and killed anyway. Te Wherowhero killed 150 prisoners with his favourite greenstone mere, only stopping when his arm got too tired. The Ngāti Maniapoto chief Tukorehu showed no mercy to the Pukerangiora people, the same people who had saved his life and his war party 10 years earlier, placing the heads of the pā's chiefs, Whatitiri and Pekapeka, on poles in front of the wharenui that had housed him a decade before. This act was well known to all the other tribes.

== Bibliography ==
- Ballara, Angela (2003). Taua: 'Musket Wars', 'Land Wars' or Tikanga?: Warfare in Māori Society in the Early Nineteenth Century. Penguin.
- Burns, Patricia (1980). Te Rauparaha: A New Perspective.
- Crosby, R. D. (1999). The Musket Wars: A History of Inter-iwi Conflict 1806–1845. Reed. ISBN 0-7900-0677-4.
- Jones, Pei Te Hurinui (1995). Nga Iwi o Tainui: The Traditional History of the Tainui People / Nga Koorero Tuku Iho a Nga Tuupuna. Edited and annotated by Bruce Biggs. Auckland University Press.
- Jones, Pei Te Hurinui (2010) [1959]. King Pōtatau (2nd ed.). Huia Press.
- Kelly, Leslie G. (2002) [1949]. Tainui: The Story of Hoturoa and His Descendants. Christchurch: Cadsonbury Publications. Originally published Wellington: Polynesian Society.
- Phillips, Finlay L. (1995). Landmarks of Tainui.
