= Uenuku =

Māori god and ancestor

- Atua of rainbows
- Gender: Male
- Region: New Zealand
- Ethnic group: Māori

Genealogy
- Parents: Tāwhaki and Parekoritawa
- Siblings: Whatitiri
- Consort: Hinepūkohurangi/Tairi-a-kohu; Iwipupu

Uenuku (or Uenuku-Kōpako, also given to some who are named after him) is an atua of rainbows and a prominent ancestor in Māori tradition. Māori believed that the rainbow's appearance represented an omen, and one kind of yearly offering made to him was that of the young leaves of the first planted kūmara crop. He was a tribal war god invoked before battles, particularly in the northern half of the country. It was said that if a taua appeared under the arch of the rainbow, it would be defeated in battle, and likewise, if they appeared to either side of the rainbow, they would be victorious. The Māori identified hawk feathers and a particular star called Uenuku as being sacred to him. (Note: The 'hawk' referred to in Tregear's book could be the kāhu.)

In Ngāti Porou and Ngāi Tahu stories, Uenuku was the Ariki of Hawaiki with 71 sons, all from different wives. In traditions from further north in the Pacific, Chief Uanuku Rakeiora and his son Ruatapu are said to have lived on Ra'iātea Island just over 27 generations ago, as descendants of Tangiia, contemporary of Iro-nui-ma-Oata (Whiro). The Aotea and Arawa tribes also have stories that relate to Chief Uenuku of Hawaiki.

In Ngāi Tūhoe stories concerning Uenuku's ascension to godhood, he betrays the trust of his supernatural wife, Hinepūkohurangi, and wanders the earth searching for her until he dies and transforms into a personification of the rainbow. The tribe claims descent from the union of Hinepūkohurangi and Te Maunga. The story is also known to Ngāpuhi, and to the Ngāti Kahungunu of Wairoa who claim descent from the union, where Hinepūkohurangi is known instead as Tairi-a-kohu. The tribes of the Kurahaupō canoe in Marlborough also regard him as an ancestor.

Uenuku is also particularly special to the Tainui Māori, who are said to have brought his spirit over from Hawaiki inside of a stone, and then transferred it into the carving of Te Uenuku. The Waikato Tainui used to invoke his spirit to temporarily inhabit smaller idols during times of war, which they would carry into battle to represent their guardian.

== Ariki of Hawaiki ==
Uenuku
- Deified ancestor from Hawaiki
- Other names: Uenuku Rakeiora
- Gender: Male
- Region: Polynesia
- Ethnic group: Māori, Cook Islands Māori
- Parents: Motoro
- Consort: Takarita; Paimahutanga
- Offspring: Taiē; Ina; Ruatapu; Paikea; Hawepotiki; Maputukiterangi; Ropanui; Mahinaiteata; Whiwhingaiterangi; Rongoruaroa/Rongoueroa; Ira

=== Uenuku and Turi ===
According to the legends of the people of the Aotea canoe, Hoimatua sent his little son Potikiroroa to give part of a burnt offering to the ariki, Uenuku. Unfortunately, the poor boy tripped at the opening of Uenuku's house, Wharekura, which bothered Uenuku so much that he killed and cannibalized him raw.

During the next summer, Hoimatua's relative Turi slew Uenuku's son Hawepotiki in revenge. He and his friends then proceeded to eat of the body, and even managed to slip the child's heart into a food basket meant for Chief Uenuku. Uenuku lamented the absence of his son, not knowing where he was, and unwittingly bit into the heart. He was quickly informed of the deeds of Turi however, and calmly swore revenge, threatening that he would feed his son's murderers to Toi-te-huatahi. Turi's wife Rongorongo later overheard Uenuku chanting incantations of revenge, so he took his people and fled to New Zealand.

=== Uenuku and Tawheta ===
According to tradition, Uenuku was a descendant of Tūmatauenga and became angry when his wife, Takarita, committed adultery with two other men, so he killed all three of them. To add insult to injury, he cooked her heart and fed it to his son Ira. Her brother, Tawheta, was more than upset with this, and so gathered a group of men and ambushed five of Uenuku's sons. Maputukiterangi, Ropanui, Mahinaiteata, and Whiwhingaiterangi were killed. The fifth, Rongoruaroa, barely survived, but he was wounded. He dragged himself back to the pā of Uenuku, who had unwittingly been entertaining his enemies as guests the whole time. Upon learning of the attack, and with a sense of duty to being a hospitable host, he instructed the guests to leave, and warned that he would pursue them at a later date.

After some time, Uenuku gathered his taua and attacked Tawheta's village. This saw the slaughter of Tawheta's priest, Hapopo, and many others among his kinsmen. Uenuku even stole Tawheta's daughter, Paimahutanga, to be his wife. This battle was called Whatiuatakamarae. Uenuku was not finished however, and using powerful incantations and spells, he summoned a great darkness, and the mists from the mountains to ascend to the earth, whereupon the enemy began to slaughter their own in confusion until only Tawheta and a handful of his men remained. Uenuku then summoned forth the light, and slaughtered the remaining enemies with ease. This second battle was called the Battle of Rotorua, or Taiparipari.

There is a variation where Whena's two children, Whatino and Wharo, were known as great thieves, and likely stole from Uenuku many times. One day, Uenuku managed to catch them, and likely slew them. Whena then slaughters all of Uenuku's children in retaliation, save for Rongoueroa. Uenuku then takes his taua to Whena's pā on Rarotonga. Summoning the fog down onto Whena's forces, he won the battle now called Te Rakungia. After dispelling the fog with more incantations, he again attacked the enemy with dogs, and succeeded in this battle called Te Mau-a-te-Kararehe at the Rotorua. After fighting Te Moana-waipu, he returned home to New Zealand, where Ruatapu was born.

In Ngāti Porou and Ngāi Tahu's traditions, Uenuku would later shame Ruatapu, either for walking atop the roof of his house, or for using either his or Kahutia-te-rangi's sacred comb, or by being denied a tapu grooming of his hair before the family set out on a new canoe that Uenuku had built - regardless of the reason, he may not use the comb due to being the son of Uenuku's slave wife. Some tellings say Ruatapu is the firstborn child, but is still junior to his younger brother on account of the difference in their heritage. After this, Ruatapu lures the nobles of Hawaiki into a canoe, and then kills all of them, save for Kahutia-te-rangi who manages to escape and migrate to New Zealand with the help of the gods. Afterwards in some versions, he uses incantations to destroy the land.

=== Uenuku and Tamatekapua ===
In Te Arawa traditions, Chief Uenuku of Ra'iātea Island becomes annoyed with a dog named Pōtaka Tawhiti, the pet of Houmaitawhiti, for eating the leaked matter of Uenuku's ulcer, by which it commits an act of desecration. He kills the dog, after which Toi-te-huatahi consumes it. The ancestor Tamatekapua and his brother Whakatūria, sons of Houmai, search for the dog, and hear it barking inside Toi's belly. In revenge, they created stilts for Tama (the taller of the brothers) and stole the fruit from Uenuku's poroporo tree. Whakatūria was captured and hung from the roof of Uenuku's house, where the people would dance and sing around a fire below him every single night. Reportedly, their singing was so horrendously bad that the brothers, under the cover of darkness, came up with a clever way to trick the people into releasing him; the next opportunity he had, he told the people that their dancing and singing was terrible, and indeed they challenged him to do better, and let him down. He had them pamper him by cleaning the soot off and giving him some fine ornaments to dress himself in for the dance. He then tricked them into opening the door, so that he could feel the cool air, outside of which his brother Tama had arrived with two wooden poles to lock the people inside. Whakatūria manages to sprint through the open door, and the brothers bolt up the building from the outside. Uenuku declares war, and with his friend Toi he attacks the village of Houmai, but the forces of Uenuku were ultimately defeated. Whakatūria also fell in the battle, so the Arawa canoe was set out to New Zealand with one purpose being to search for meaning behind his death. At this time, the Tainui canoe was also on its way to New Zealand at this time. In this telling, Uenuku lived four generations after Ruatapu, who was one of Houmaitawhiti's ancestors.

== Uenuku and the mist maiden ==
In traditions most commonly associated with Ngāi Tūhoe—the children of the mist—Uenuku was once human, and one early morning when he was out hunting, in a clearing, he saw two women. One was named Hinepūkohurangi who seemed to coalesce out of the morning mist, and her sister was Hinewai. They were daughters of Ranginui the sky father. He persuaded Hinepūkohurangi to stay and talk with him for a moment and to return the next night. She continued to return to him every night afterwards, and before long they fell in love. As a mist maiden her home was in the sky, so she had to leave him at dawn by the calling of her sister Hinewai. At last, she agreed to marry Uenuku on condition that he tell no one about her.

They had a few months of happiness, though she still appeared only at night and left at dawn, and in time Hinepūkohurangi became pregnant, but no one else could see her and therefore Uenuku was ridiculed. His kinsmen were sceptical of this wife they had never seen - in some tellings, their daughter was already born. He tried to explain that his wife left him each morning at first light, so his friends suggested that he block up the doors and windows so she could not see the sun. Finally after more torturous ridicule, he was convinced to block the windows and door when she came to him one night so that she could not see the daylight in the morning, then he could prove she existed. This he did, but of course, the mist maiden felt tricked when she found he had deceived her. She sang him a song of farewell and returned to the sky and left him for as long as he lived.

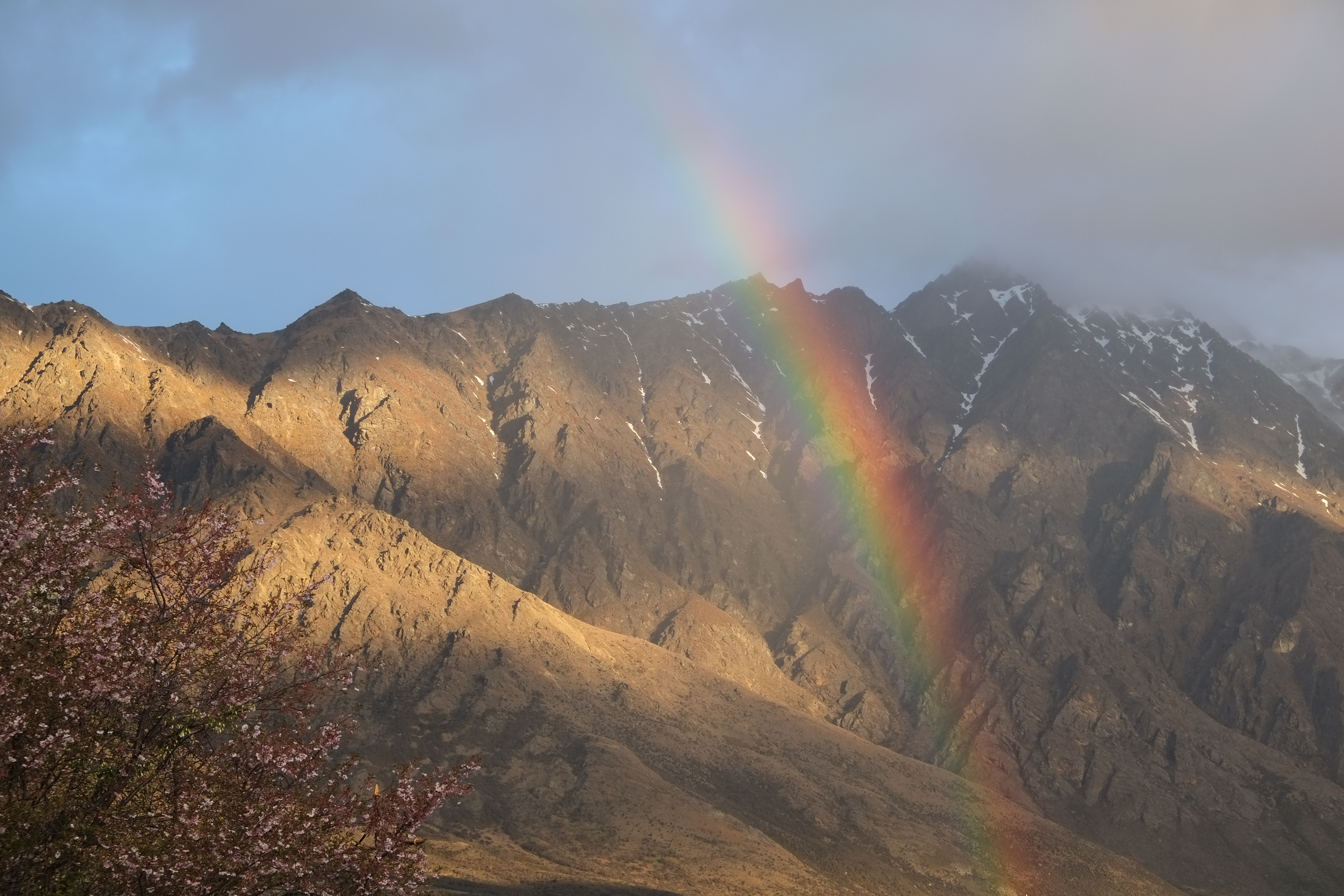
Rainbow in the evening sun at The Remarkables. Uenuku is a famous atua of the rainbow.

Uenuku wandered the world searching for his beloved wife. At last, nearer to his death, seeing him lonely and bent with age, Ranginui took pity, and changed him into a rainbow so that he could join his family in the sky, where they remain to this day and watch over their descendants together.

The name of the mountain Tapuae-o-Uenuku on the Kaikōura Ranges translates as 'footprint of the rainbow', however its former name Mount Tapuaenuku, which means 'to shuffle feet', was a memorial to Chief Tapuaenuku who climbed Nga Tapu Wae o Uenuku ('the sacred steps of Uenuku'), the rainbow path of his war-god ancestor Uenuku, on Tapuae-o-Uenuku in search of his wife, a goddess, and perished at the top where the two rejoined in the afterlife similarly to Uenuku who, in Kurahaupō traditions, also climbed a mountain in search of his own supernatural wife and child where they became a set of mountain ranges. Today the apparition of a rainbow above Tapuae-o-Uenuku serves as a reminder of his journey.

== Iwipupu and the rainbow ==
In one story, Uenuku visits a woman named Iwipupu over the course of many nights, while her husband Chief Tamatea-ariki-nui of Hawaiki is away from home. Iwipupu falls pregnant to the supernatural entity, with his instructions being to name the child Uenuku-titi if it was a girl, and Uenuku-rangi if it is a boy. As soon as Tamatea returned, Iwipupu told him she had been visited by somebody of his likeness, and then he figured that it was the spirit of Uenuku who made her pregnant.

Some months later, Iwipupu birthed a stillborn child. Tamatea took the child to a tapu place, where he cuts his hair, to bury it later. Upon returning, the body had disappeared, and manifested into a rainbow above the ocean, alongside Hine-korako.

In a version recorded from Hori Ropiha of Waipawa in the late 19th century, Iwipupu was visited after Tamatea offered an umbilical cord to his atua, Uenuku, by hanging it up over the window. A child was later born named Uenuku-wharekuta.

== Artefacts ==
According to local legend, the spirit of Uenuku was brought from Hawaiki to the North Island in a stone by the people of the Tainui. When they landed, they made the large carving known as either Uenuku or Te Uenuku out of tōtara with a round opening at the top, in which the stone was placed so that the spirit of Uenuku inhabited the carving. The carving is unique in form, and bears a noted resemblance to Hawaiian carving styles.

Today, Te Awamutu Museum in Waikato has Te Uenuku in its possession. Due to his spiritual significance, photographs are prohibited without the permission of the Māori sovereign.

== Similar characters ==
=== Kahukura ===
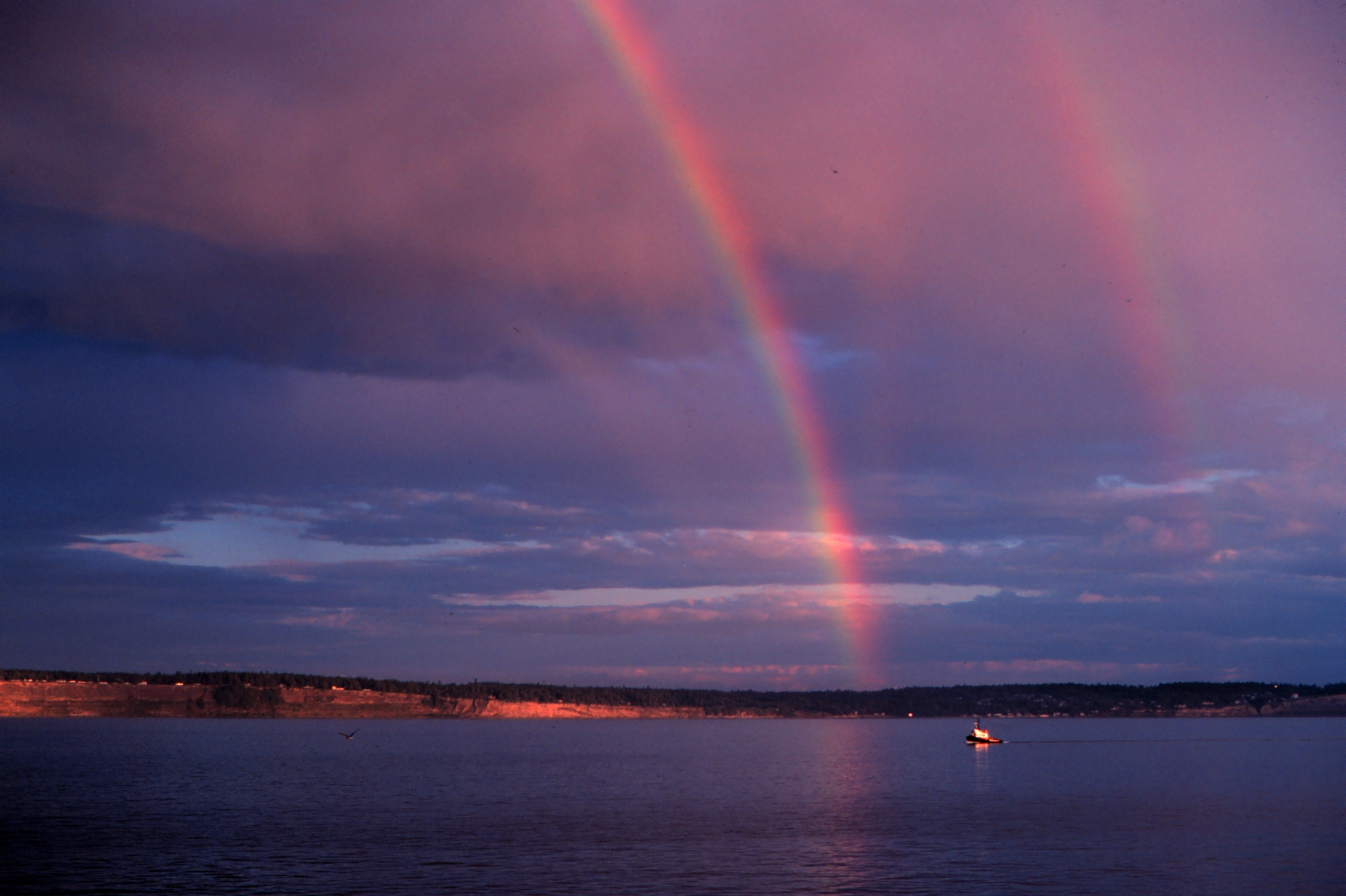
Two rainbows. Kahukura is another atua of the rainbow. Tūāwhiorangi is his wife, represented by the lower bow.

In the traditions of Ngāti Awa, Kahukura (also Kahukura-pango, and Kahukura-i-te-rangi) is the name of another atua who manifests as the upper bow during double rainbows, and may also be a god of war in some places whose apparition represents an omen. He was the spirit guardian invoked by tribal tohunga and appealed to for advice and omens in times of war. Each hapū had an image of Kahukura, often a small carved wooden figure, which was kept in a tapu place. A literal translation of Kahukura is 'red garment'. Rongonuiatau may be a similar atua.

It is said that he was the descendant of Pou-te-aniwaniwa (possibly Pou-te-anuanua of Rarotonga), and the son of Rongo-mai (personified form of meteors and meteorites) and Hine-te-wai. Using the bodies of his mother, father, Paoka-o-te-rangi, Totoe-rangi, Tahaina, Kaurukiruki, and Hereumu, he built a bridge from Hawaiki to New Zealand for himself and his wife Rongoiamo to cross the Pacific Ocean. With this bridge, they are the origin of the kūmara in New Zealand.

This atua's wife is Tūāwhiorangi, who appears as the lower rainbow during a double rainbow, sometimes she may be referred to as ‘Atua wharoro mai te rangi’. Other names include Pou-te-aniwaniwa and Kahukura-whare.

Te Tihi o Kahukura ('the citadel of Kahukura') above Ferrymead on the Banks Peninsula in Canterbury is named after him. In some Kāi Tahu traditions, he cloaks the lands with forests and birds during creation, a role taken on by Tāne in other Māori traditions. Ōkahukura in Auckland is also named after him.

Kahukura also shares his name with two ancestors; one was a Northern ancestor who learnt the art of making nets from the patupaiarehe, the other returned to Hawaiki aboard Horouta to bring the kūmara back to New Zealand.

==== Kahukura's whakapapa ====
| Rongomai | Hinetōwai |
| Kahukura | Hinekōrako |

=== Haere ===
Haere is a Ngāi Tūhoe name for another atua of the rainbow. There are at least three representing brothers, or forms: Haere-kohiko, Haere-waewae and Haere-atautu. One story says they went to avenge their father's death, and failed the first time on breaking a rule of tapu, and then later succeeded with the use of incantations. In some ancient traditions, Moekahu the dog atua of Tūhoe is said to be their sister. Very little is still remembered of Haere.

=== ʻĀnuenue ===
In Hawaiian mythology, ʻĀnuenue is a rainbow maiden who acts as the messenger for her brothers Kāne and Kanaloa who frequently send her to collect the offspring of Kū and Hine. She plays a minor role in the story of Lau-ka-ʻieʻie, but features more prominently as the ghost of Laka in another story. She may be known across Polynesia as Anuanua.

== Film ==
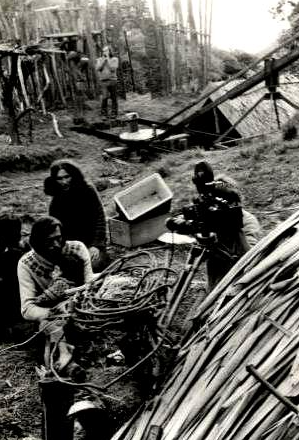
Alun Bollinger filming with Helen Bollinger on sound and Geoff Murphy Photo Barry Thomas Waimarama 1973.

"Uenuku" was a 1974 film by Blerta's Acme Sausage Company (ASC), directed by Geoff Murphy with Alun Bollinger on camera and a large cast and crew. It was commissioned by the Broadcasting Corporation of NZ and managed by Peach Wemyss Astor Ltd. It was a freewheeling adaptation of the story of Uenuku and his lover, the mist maiden. Filmed in Waimarama, it was the first TV drama to be entirely performed in te reo (The Listener magazine provided a translation prior to screening).

== See also ==
- Cupid and Psyche
- Beauty and the Beast
- Hsienpo and Yingt’ai, lover personifications of the rainbow in Chinese folklore
