= Te Roroa =

Māori iwi (tribe) in Aotearoa (New Zealand)

- Iwi (tribe) in Māoridom
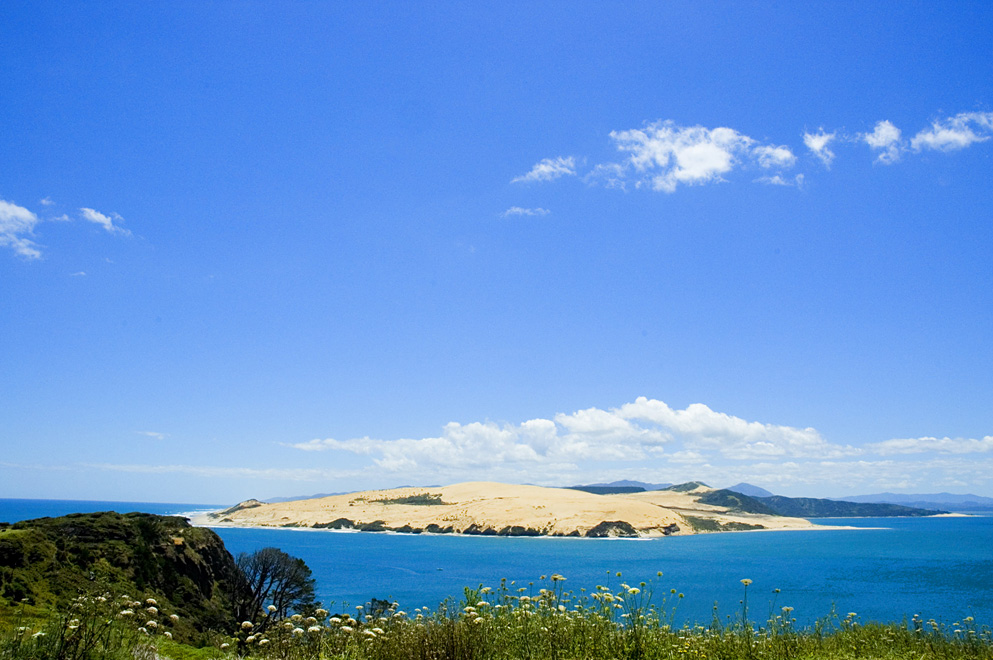
- Hokianga Harbour

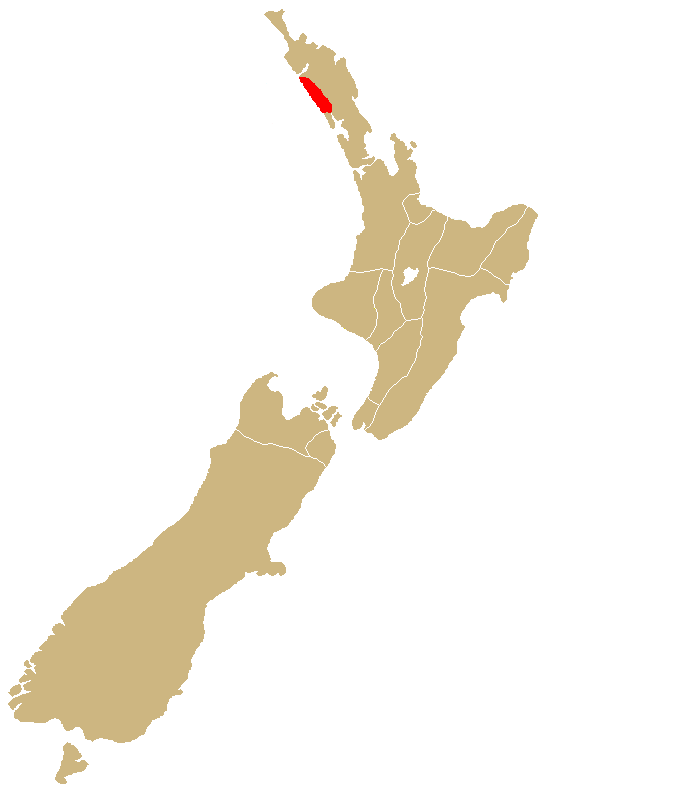
- Rohe (region): Northland
- Website: www.teroroa.iwi.nz

Emblem

Te Roroa is a Māori iwi from the region between the Kaipara Harbour and the Hokianga Harbour in Northland, New Zealand. They are part of the Ngāti Whātua confederation of tribes.

In the early 19th century Te Roroa fought a series of wars with Ngāpuhi. In 1807 or 1808, following earlier battles, the Ngāpuhi chief Pokaia led a campaign against Te Roroa. Te Roroa, led by their chief Tāoho, and their Ngāti Whātua allies led by Murupaenga ambushed and defeated the Ngāpuhi forces in the Te Kai-a-te-karoro battle at Moremonui.

== Hapū and marae ==
Te Roroa does not have hapū, and it is affiliated with the following marae (meeting places) and wharenui (meeting houses):

- Matatina marae, including Tuohu wharenui, Waipoua
- Pananawe marae, including Te Taumata o Tiopira Kinaki wharenui, Waipoua
- Te Houhanga marae, including Rāhiri wharenui, Dargaville
- Te Whakamaharatanga marae, including Whakamaharatanga Memorial Hall, Waiotemarama
- Waikarā, including Te Uaua wharenui, Aranga
- Waikaraka marae, including Whakarongo wharenui, Kaihū.

== Governance ==
Te Roroa Whatu Ora Trust is recognised by the New Zealand Government as the settlement governance entity of Te Roroa, following its Treaty of Waitangi settlement with the Crown under the Te Roroa Claims Settlement Act. It represents Te Roroa as an iwi authority under the Resource Management Act and is a Tūhono organisation. The private trust is governed by twelve trustees elected by iwi whānui. As of 2016, the chairperson is Alan Sonny Nesbit, the operations manager is Snow Taoho Tane and the trust is based in Dargaville.

The iwi has interests in the territories of Northland Regional Council, Far North District Council and Kaipara District Council.
