= Te Rauangaanga =

Chief of the Ngati Mahuta

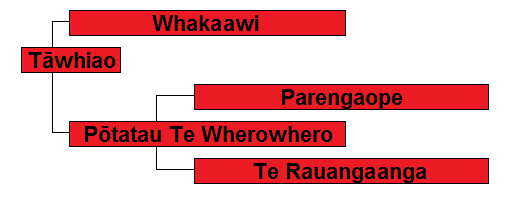
- Family tree of Te Rauangaanga
- Spouse(s): Parengaope
- Issue: Pōtatau Te Wherowhero; Kati Takiwaru
- Father: Tuata
- Mother: Te Kaahurangi

Te Rauangaanga (sometimes written Te Rau-angaanga or Te Rau-anga-anga) was the chief of the Ngāti Mahuta tribe of the Waikato tribal confederation and the principal war chief of the confederation in the late 18th and early 19th centuries. His son Pōtatau Te Wherowhero became the first Maori king.

== Biography ==
=== Family ===
Te Rau-angaanga belonged to the senior chiefly line of Ngāti Mahuta. His father was Tuata, whose father was Tawhia-ki-te-rangi, whose father was Te Putu, the chief who lived at Taupiri pā on Taupiri mountain. Te Rau-angaanga married Parengaope, daughter of a chief of Ngāti Koura, a hapū (subtribe) of Waikato.

=== Career ===
Te Rau-angaanga was regarded as a great military tactician mainly because of the successful defence of his lands from attack by coastal Tainui people led by Pikauterangi in about 1807. Pikauterangi, of Ngāti Toa, had formed a coalition of southern and eastern tribes to invade the Waikato. His army mustered some 10,000 warriors, according to the oral tradition of the Waikato people. Te Rau-angaanga was only able to muster 3,000 warriors, but defeated and repelled the army facing him just south of Ohaupo, halfway between Hamilton and Te Awamutu, at the Battle of Hingakaka, considered to be the largest battle ever fought on the New Zealand mainland.

Twenty years later Te Rau-angaanga commanded 1,600 Waikato warriors who captured the pā of Ngāti Toa leader Te Rauparaha at Hikuparea on Kāwhia Harbour. In 1819, he captured Te Totara pā at Kāwhia.
