= Parengaope =

Māori high chieftain

- Born: Ca. 1765
- Consort: Te Rauangaanga
- Issue: Pōtatau Te Wherowhero; Kati Takiwaru; Rangi-tiaho
- Father: Tokohihi
- Mother: Paretewa

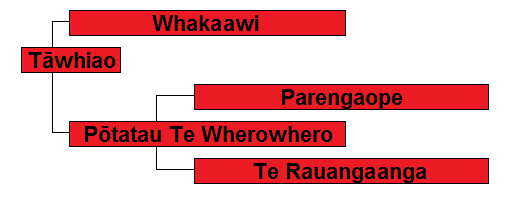
Family tree of Chiefess Parengaope.

Parengaope (c. 1765 – ?) was a female Māori high chieftain of Ngāti Koura, a hapū (subtribe) of the Waikato tribal confederation. She was the wife of Te Rauangaanga and mother of Pōtatau Te Wherowhero, the first Māori king, and grandmother of King Tāwhiao.

== Life ==
Parengaope was born at Te Rapa pā near present-day Hamilton. She was a direct descendant of Hotumauea, a noted war chief of Ngāti Koura who was an outstanding warrior and acquired vast tracts of land within the Waikato basin.

Her father was Tokohihi, and his father was Pakaruwakanui, the son of Hotumauea. Her mother was Paretewa, and the mother of Paretewa was Kuiatu.

She was present during the battle of Matakitaki in 1822 at Pirongia when the musket-armed northern Ngāpuhi tribes under Hongi Hika attacked the Waikato tribes. Parengaope escaped along with other members of Potatau's family during the attack on Matakitaki.
