= Pōtatau Te Wherowhero =

First Māori king

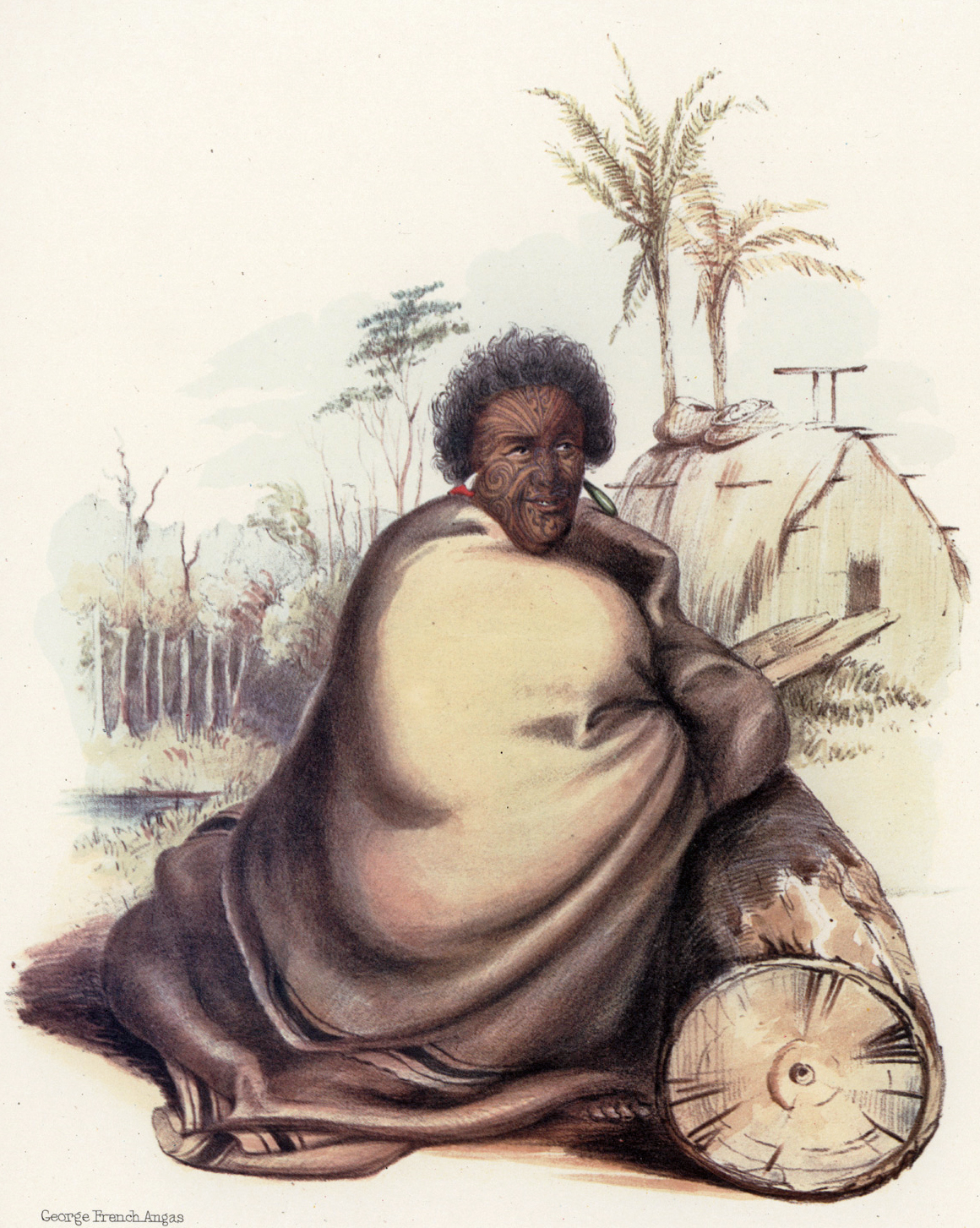
- Painting by George French Angas

Māori King
- Reign: June 1858 – 25 June 1860
- Coronation: 1858
- Successor: Tāwhiao
- Born: c. 1770–1800
- Died: 25 June 1860; Ngāruawāhia, Auckland Province, New Zealand
- Burial: Mount Taupiri
- Spouse: Whakaawi; Raharaha; Waiata; Ngawaero
- Issue: Tāwhiao
- Father: Te Rauangaanga
- Mother: Parengaope

Pōtatau Te Wherowhero (died 25 June 1860) was a Māori rangatira who reigned as the inaugural Māori King from 1858 until his death. A powerful nobleman and a leader of the Waikato iwi of the Tainui confederation, he was the founder of the Te Wherowhero royal dynasty. His 1858 coronation followed years of efforts to create the Kīngitanga, a Māori monarchy intended as an equivalent of the British monarchy, and to foster Māori nationalism against settler encroachment.

He was first known just as Te Wherowhero and took the name Pōtatau after he was crowned. As disputes over land grew more severe, Te Wherowhero found himself increasingly at odds with the Government and its policies. Although he accepted the throne reluctantly and reigned only briefly, he has been credited with establishing a number of historical precedents for the Kīngitanga that survive today, as well as more broadly for the rise of pan-Māori identity.

== Early life ==
Te Wherowhero was the eldest son of Te Rau-angaanga, who belonged to the chiefly line of Ngāti Mahuta and was a prominent war leader before and during the 1807–1845 Musket Wars. When Te Wherowhero was born near the end of the 18th century his father had just become the principal war chief of the Waikato tribes. Te Rau-angaanga defeated a much larger coastal Tainui and Taranaki force of about 7,000 warriors led by Ngāti Toa chief Pikauterangi in the battle of Hingakaka near Ohaupo. Te Wherowhero's mother, Te Parengaope, was a daughter of a chief of Ngāti Koura, a hapū (subtribe) of Waikato. Te Wherowhero was thus descended from the captains of both the Tainui and Te Arawa waka (canoes), which are said to have brought Māori to New Zealand.

Te Wherowhero grew up in a period of relative peace for the Waikato tribes, following his father's victory over Ngāti Toa in the battle of Hingakaka. He was taught traditional lore, first by his father and then at Te Papa-o-Rotu, the Waikato whare wananga (school of knowledge) at Whatawhata. He lived at Kaitotehe pā on the western bank of the Waikato River, at the base of the Hakarimata Range and opposite Taupiri on the other bank. He had four wives, Whakaawi, Raharaha, Waiata and Ngawaero. His children included Matutaera Tāwhiao, Te Paea Tiaho, Makareta Te Otaota and Tiria (these last two may be the same person).

When his fellow Ngāti Mahuta chief and relative Te Uira killed a Ngāti Toa man, and was in return killed by a war party led by Ngāti Toa chief Te Rauparaha, Te Wherowhero joined his father in attacks on Ngāti Toa at Kāwhia.

When Marore, a wife of Te Rauparaha, was visiting relatives in Waikato for a tangihanga in about 1820, Te Wherowhero instigated her murder by Te Rangi-moe-waka. After a series of revenge killings, Te Wherowhero led 3,000 Waikato and Ngāti Maniapoto warriors on an overland attack on Kāwhia, while 1,500 of their allies from Whaingaroa (Raglan) attacked by a sea route. Together they defeated Ngāti Toa at Te Kakara, near Lake Taharoa, and Waikawau, south of Tirua Point. Te Rauparaha and Ngāti Toa were then besieged at Te Arawi, near Kāwhia Harbour. Some of the Waikato and Maniapoto besiegers did not want to see Ngāti Toa exterminated, so they were permitted to give up their territory at Kāwhia and migrate to northern Taranaki.

Te Wherowhero led a large army to Taranaki, partly to pursue Ngāti Toa and partly to rescue Peehi Tukorehu, a Ngāti Maniapoto chief, whose war party was besieged by Taranaki tribes at Pukerangiora, on the Waitara River. Although never forced to retreat, he incurred large costs in human life in sieges which were sometimes unsuccessful. Early in 1822 the Waikato forces suffered a heavy defeat at the hands of Ngāti Toa and their allies at Motunui in north Taranaki. Te Wherowhero was almost killed when he refused to retreat and abandon the body of a slain Waikato chief. The intervention of Te Rauparaha saved him, but subsequently he had to engage a number of enemy chiefs in single combat, armed with only a digging implement. Eventually his own people returned and a negotiated truce ensued.

Te Wherowhero returned to the Waikato that year in time to take command in an unsuccessful defence of his tribe at Matakitaki (Pirongia) against Ngāpuhi, armed with muskets and led by Hongi Hika on their great rampage through the North Island of 1818 to 1823. The Waikato people settled further south than their usual territory for several years, in fear of further attacks by Ngāpuhi. Te Wherowhero lived at Orongokoekoea on the upper Mōkau River, where his wife Whakaawi gave birth to their son Tāwhiao. Peace was made with Ngāpuhi in 1823 and the Waikato re-established themselves on their tribal land. By the time Ngāpuhi re-appeared in the area some ten years later the Waikato had also acquired muskets and could therefore defend themselves successfully.

In 1831 Te Wherowhero led an immense war party against the Taranaki Māori and killed many hundreds of the Ngātiawa tribe, whose lands more than ten years later he claimed by right of conquest.

In 1832 the Waikato tribes led by Te Wherowhero fought a large battle at Ngunguru sandspit against the local Te Waiariki, ending a sustained campaign against Ngapuhi and their coastal allies such as Te Waiariki.

By 1836 Te Wherowhero made peace with the Taranaki tribes. This occurred at a time when missionaries were having a greater impact on iwi in the Waikato. Te Wherowhero himself regularly attended services, but was never baptised.

Waikato's (or more specifically Ngāti Maniapoto's) involvement in the Taranaki war against Government forces in the 1860s can be traced back to Te Wherowhero's long series of attacks against the Taranaki iwi Te Āti Awa. Te Wherowhero at one stage claimed Te Āti Awa were slaves who lived there only on his sufferance, but he was prepared to end all interest in the land when he was paid £250. Keenan argues that Te Wherowhero never occupied Te Āti Awa's land long enough to constitute possession according to Māori customary lore. Nor did Te Āti Awa ever entirely abandon their land, thereby maintaining their occupation rights. During the latter stages of the war in Taranaki it was the involvement of Waikato warriors in bringing food and war materiel (lead and powder) that enabled the Taranaki warriors to keep fighting in the infertile, wet and inhospitable uplands.

== Treaty and influence with Grey ==
In March 1840 Te Wherowhero was living at Awhitu in the western Manukau. Captain William Symonds brought a copy of the Treaty of Waitangi to Manukau for chiefs to sign, but Te Wherowhero refused. However he was friendly towards the colonial government and not opposed to Pākehā presence in areas he controlled. Initially Te Wherowhero favoured the Pākehā arrivals in his territory: his daughter, Tiria, married the trader John Kent.

In May 1844 Te Wherowhero hosted a large intertribal gathering at Remuera, near Auckland, with the view mainly of impressing Governor Robert FitzRoy with the power of Northern Māori. He was subsequently received at Government House, Auckland, and treated with great distinction by Fitzroy. Te Wherowhero built a house at Pukekawa (in today's Auckland Domain) and it witnessed many discussions and negotiations concerning the implementation of the Treaty.

The Waikato tribes sold land initially; Te Wherowhero sold some tribal land around Manukau. However in 1846 he protested vehemently to Queen Victoria about an edict that land not actually occupied or cultivated by Māori was to be considered Crown property.

Between 1847 and 1852 Governor Grey arranged for 861 retired British soldiers called fencibles and their families to establish a number of military villages at Howick, Panmure, Otahuhu and Onehunga. In April 1849 Te Wherowhero signed an agreement with Governor George Grey to provide Auckland with military protection on the same basis as the fencibles. 121 Ngati Mahuta -originally from Tamahere, now on the southern outskirts of Hamilton, had British officers but supplied their own weapons. The land they were given by Grey was 80 one acre lots and 80 five acre lots at Māngere. Other chiefs who made the agreement were Kati, Nopora, Kahawai, Ponku, Te Tauke, Rewaite, Hankapanga, Te Katea and Rameka Kiaki (sic). They could be called upon for defence should it become necessary after the violent uprising of Māori under Hōne Heke and Kawiti. Grey had learnt the importance of having the support of kūpapa, Māori who sided with the Crown, during that campaign to restore law and order and assert government authority. During the 1851 attack on Auckland by about 350-450 Ngati Paoa a British regiment, the Onehunga fencibles and HMS Fry defended Auckland at Mechanics Bay with Ngati Mahuta playing no part.

Although he never ceded sovereignty to the British Crown, he did have good rapport with early New Zealand governors, especially George Grey.

As more settlers came to New Zealand, from the early 1850s Te Wherowhero became less friendly to the Pākehā. This was at least partially due to the nature of these arrivals in the Waikato lands, who often encroached on Māori tribal lands with no formal jurisdiction or consensual purchasing or gifting of the land.

== Māori King ==
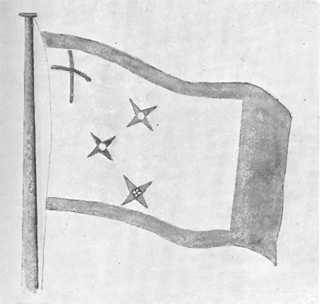
The flag hoisted at Ngāruawāhia on the proclamation of Pōtatau Te Wherowhero as Māori King. Drawn 1863.

In the early 1850s, a movement to establish a Māori King developed, as shared monarchy of numerous Māori iwi of New Zealand. This aimed to unite the Māori people and to act as a counterbalance to Queen Victoria. But above all the King Movement wanted to halt the sale and alienation of Māori land by the Pākehā Government.

Mātene Te Whiwhi travelled throughout New Zealand seeking a chief of high standing who was willing to be king. Iwikau Te Heuheu Tūkino III of Ngāti Tūwharetoa suggested that Te Wherowhero should be approached, and his choice was supported by Wiremu Tāmihana of Ngāti Hauā. Pōtatau, then elderly, expressed initial reluctance, but agreed in April 1857 at Rangiriri. He was installed as king at Ngāruawāhia in June 1858.

Pōtatau himself wished to continue to work in co-operation with the British Government, but many of his followers adopted a much more independent position. Gradually the two sides polarised and grew apart, culminating five years later in warfare (see Invasion of the Waikato and New Zealand Wars).

=== Death ===
Pōtatau died at Ngāruawāhia on 25 June 1860 and is buried on Mount Taupiri, a mountain close to his royal residence in Ngāruawāhia. His son Matutaera Tāwhiao succeeded him.

== See also ==
- Māori King Movement
- Treaty of Waitangi
- Waikato (iwi)

== Notes ==
Māori royalty
New title	Māori King; 1858–1860	Succeeded by Tāwhiao
