= Northland Conservation Park =

Protected conservation area in New Zealand

- Location within New Zealand
- Location: New Zealand
- Coordinates: 35.64°S 173.55°E
- Area: 80,180 hectares (198,100 acres)
- Established: 1984
- Governing body: Department of Conservation

Northland Conservation Park is a group of protected areas in the Northland Region of New Zealand's North Island.

The park includes Waipoua Forest and a number of other sites managed by the New Zealand Department of Conservation, including Warawara, Herekino (Note: Not to be confused with the commercial forest west of Manukau North), Maungataniwha, Raetea, Omahuta, Waima, Mataraua, Puketi, Waikino, Russell, Hukerenui, Kaiikanui, Kaihu, Houto, Pukenui and Tangihua Forests.

The park covers 80,180 hectares (198,100 acres).

Maungataniwha Forest and Raetea Forest are open for hunting.

== History ==
The Waipoua Forest Sanctuary was formally established in 1953 following a long public campaign.

The Northland Conservation Park was established in 1984, and came under the management of the Department of Conservation when it was established in 1987.

Since 1988, the Department has been investigating the establishment of a national park based around Waipoua Forest. Since 2008, the Department has been consulting with Te Roroa on establishing a national park within its tribal area.
