= Paikea =

Cultural ancestor in Polynesia

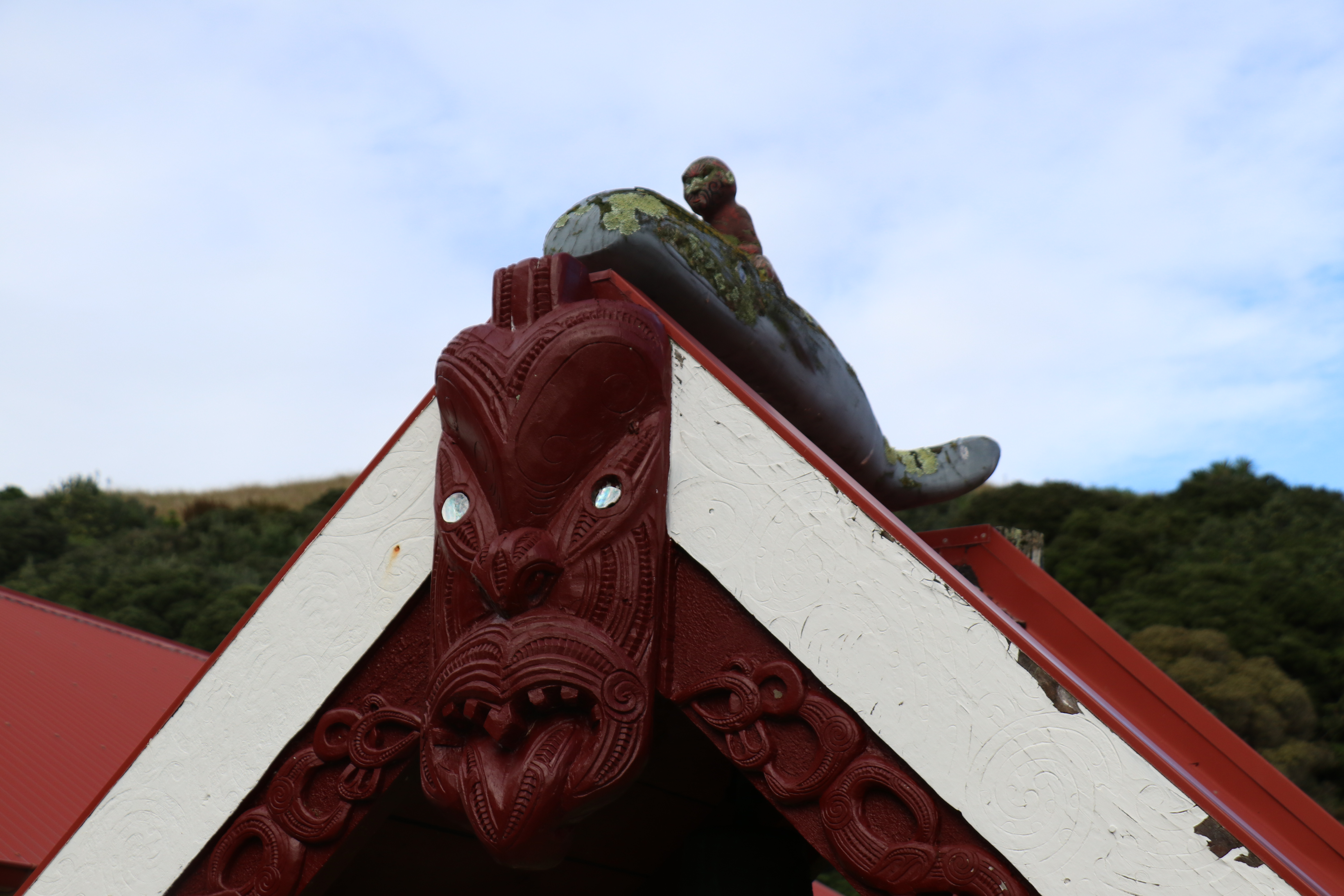
- Carving at Whāngārā Marae of Paikea riding a whale
- Gender: Male
- Region: Polynesia
- Ethnic group: Māori, Cook Islands Māori

Genealogy
- Parents: Uenuku
- Siblings: Taiē; Ina; Ruatapu; Maputukiterangi; Ropanui; Mahinaiteata; Whiwhingaiterangi; Rongoruaroa/Rongoueroa; Ira
- Consort: Ahurumowairaka; Hoturangi

Paikea is a notable ancestor who originated in Hawaiki according to Māori tradition. He is particularly known to tribes with origins in the Gisborne District such as Ngāti Porou, and Ngāi Tahu. Paikea is the name assumed by Kahutia-te-rangi because he was assisted by a whale to survive an attempt on his life by his half-brother Ruatapu.

On the island of Aitutaki, he is also known as a brother of Ruatapu, but is not as famous as him. In an account, probably from the Kāti Kurī hapū of Ngāi Tahu, the family lived on Mangaia.

== Ruatapu's shame ==
Ruatapu became offended when his father Uenuku elevated his older half-brother Kahutia-te-rangi ahead of him. When Ruatapu was about to use a sacred comb belonging to Kahutia-te-rangi, Uenuku rebuked him, pointing out that Kahutia-te-rangi was of high rank while Ruatapu was of low birth, because his mother was a slave wife.

Some tellings also say Uenuku had built a canoe for his 70 sons and set about to do their hair with sacred combs for the first voyage, or that Ruatapu was about to use Uenuku's own sacred comb rather than Kahutia's. Either way, Ruatapu is told he cannot use any sacred comb because of his heritage, and is shamed.

In other accounts, the rebuke came when Ruatapu dared to walk on the roof of Uenuku's house.

== Ruatapu's revenge ==
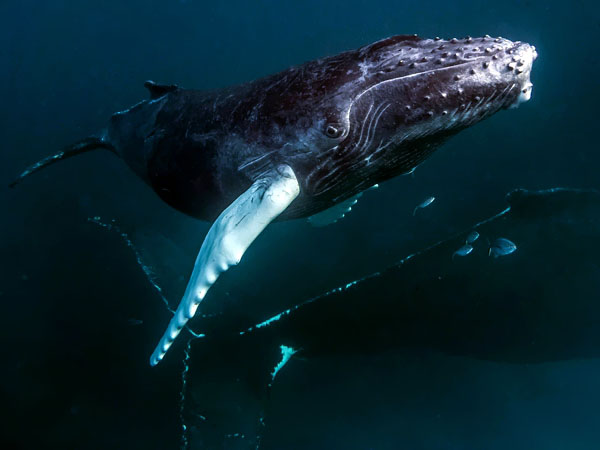
Humpback whales at the South Bank of the Dominican Republic. This species is closely associated with the ancestor Paikea.

Angry and ashamed at his father's disparaging comments, he lured Kahutia-te-rangi and a large number of the other noble sons of Uenuku into a canoe the next day and took them out to sea. He had hid the bailer somewhere onshore prior, and as soon as they were far enough he unplugged a preformed hole on the canoe flooring, drowning all members aboard - apart from Kahutia-te-rangi who recited an incantation invoking his ancestor Tangaroa, or the goddess Moakuramanu, to call forth a whale (usually considered to be a southern humpback whale - paikea to carry him ashore. Kahutia-te-rangi was the sole survivor of his brother's evildoing and assumed the name Paikea as a memorial of the assistance he received from the whale.

In some versions, Kahutia-te-rangi himself transformed into the whale. In some tellings Ruatapu simply slays everybody with a spear once they're out at sea - again with the exception of Paikea who takes to the oceans and is saved by the gods.

== The waves of Ruatapu ==
The episode where Ruatapu threatens to return as the great waves of the eighth month may explain other accounts which portray Ruatapu as having invoked a great flood which destroyed Hawaiki. Such accounts or conclusions may result from Christian influence. According to Ruatapu's account in the Ngāti Porou accounts, Ruatapu shouted out to Kahutia-te-rangi that he would return to fight him: "The great waves of the eighth month, they are me! I am then approaching!" In an endnote, Reedy writes:

In the eighth month of the Māori calendar, in the early summer, large waves known as ngā tai o Rangawhenua, Rangawhenua's waves, sometimes break upon the shore on the East Coast. In this episode Ruatapu announces that in the eighth month he will take this form, and follow Paikea.

The eighth month of the Māori calendar is Kohitātea (December-January) according to Ngāi Tūhoe.

== Whāngārā connection ==
Ngāti Konohi is the Ngāti Porou hapū that is closely associated with Whāngārā, a small settlement located between Gisborne and Tolaga Bay. Oral traditions of the hapū state that Paikea came to New Zealand from Hawaiki on the back of a whale following an event known as Te Huripureiata, a slaughter of the first born sons of Hawaiki at sea. According to tradition, the whale turned into stone, and is now the island of Whāngārā (also known as Te Toka a Rangi or Te Ana o Paikea), immediately offshore.

== Kāti Kurī version ==
In a version probably recorded from Kaikōura, Paikea was the youngest of Uenuku's sons, and his favourite, which made the other siblings incredibly jealous of him. His brothers plot to kill him, intending to slay him out on a fishing trip and tell Uenuku that he drowned. Paikea, through feigning his sleep that night, learned of the plan, and so deliberately sunk the canoe the next day himself, killing his brothers. Paikea alone remained alive, clinging to the remains of the canoe for survival, awaiting his death. Suddenly, a tohorā came to his aid, and carried him all the way to Whāngārā.

== See also ==
- Jonah
- Whale Rider, a book (by Witi Ihimaera) and film inspired in part by the story of Paikea and Ruatapu.
