= Ruatapu =

Master canoeist in Polynesian tradition

- Other names: ruatapu
- Gender: Male
- Region: Polynesia
- Ethnic group: Māori, Cook Islands Māori

Genealogy
- Parents: Uanuku Rakeiora/Uenuku, Unnamed slave woman (Māori)
- Siblings: Taiē, Ina, (Cook Islands) Paikea, Ira
- Consort: Uanukukaiatia/Uanukutapu, Tapotuki Tonga, Tutunoa (Cook Islands)
- Offspring: Tamaiva, Moenau, Kirikava, Te Arauenua, Te Urutupui, Tongirau, Touketa (Cook Islands); Hau (Māori)

Ruatapu was a son of the great chief Uenuku, and a master canoeist in Polynesian tradition who is said to have lived around 30 generations ago. Most Māori stories agree he was an older half-brother of Paikea and 69 other sons, while traditions recorded from the Cook Islands sometimes state he was Uanuku Rakeiora's only son.

In the oral traditions of the Cook Islands, Ruatapu travels around central Polynesia; from the Society Islands, to the Cook Islands, and lastly to Tonga before coming back to the Cook Islands to live out the rest of his days and eventually die at Aitutaki. Most traditions record him as a prominent ancestor, gaining three wives between the last two groups of islands.

== Cook Island traditions ==
The stories relating to Ruatapu's life are fairly consistent with each other. The Journal of the Polynesian Society records at least two variations given from Aitutaki recorded from historian Timi Koro, and Chief Isaia, and Chief Tararo of Ma'uke, translated by Major J.T. Large at Mangaia. According to a native of Atiu, there is also a tribe known as Ruatapu.

=== Ruatapu's travels ===
Ruatapu and his father Chief Uanuku Rakeiora lived at Taputapuatea on Ra'iātea some 30 or so generations ago, and were descendants of Iro-nui-ma Oata. A fond canoeist, Ruatapu had dreamed since boyhood of travelling to his own island to become ariki like his father. For this he crafted the canoe Te Kareroaitai out of a tamanu tree before setting out to the ocean upon reaching adulthood. Eight or nine days later, he arrived at Avarua Harbour at Rarotonga and met local Chief Potikitaua of Avananui village who told him the island's ariki was Chief Tangiia. He decided to settle here, and found a wife out of Uanukukaiatia, or Uanukutapu, with whom he had a son with named Tamaiva.

Four years later, Ruatapu left Rarotonga alone in search of a new island, leaving Tamaiva to grow up and become the island's ariki. After many days and nights at sea, Ruatapu arrived at Tongatapu where the first person he met was Tapotuki Tonga, who informed him that the island's ariki was Chief Kaukura. Ruatapu stayed with Tapotuki Tonga, growing fond of her, and ended up having another son with her named Moenau.

While the child was still young, Ruatapu decided to leave again, but first instructing Tapotuki Tonga's father Rangiura to take Moenau back to Rarotonga to be with Uanukukaiatia and Tamaiva, to share chiefly authority. Rangiura being another noted canoe voyager, constructed a new canoe for this voyage and named it Pouara. On this trip, the canoe capsized on a reef. The spot where this happened was called Vaenga, the place where they landed is today called Pouara after the canoe. A man named Anga brought them to Uanukukaiatia and Tamaiva. Upon the two families meeting, Uanukukaiatia and Tamaiva were jealous of Moenau and did not wish to take him in. They instructed that he should be taken to the Ngaputoru islands (Atiu, Ma'uke, and Mitiaro) where he could become ariki. After five days of rest and repairing the canoe Pouara, Rangiura and Moenau set out to Ngaputoru. On this voyage they struck bad weather and Rangiura was killed on the reef of Ma'uke. Moenau survived and was taken in by the local people.

Once he had grown into a strong young man, Moenau married a native Ma'uke woman named Te Kaumarokura, or Te Raumarokura, with whom he had a son named Te Aukura (sometimes -arikiki Mauketau is added, meaning 'Ariki of Mauketau'). Due to Moenau's greed in taking all the fishermans' catchments for himself, the people of Ma‘uke devised a plan to kill him. Two warriors named Taratekui and Taratekurapo were chosen to kill Moenau using a fine cord made out of coconut-fibre (kaa natipui). After luring him out of his house, they caught him by the testicles with the cord and overpowered him, killing him with spears before throwing the body into a cave in the Makatea. While the people of Ma'uke were joyed that he was gone, Te Kaumarokura grieved over her loss, and feared she would be killed along with their now four-year-old son Te Aukura. Instead, Taratekui and Taratekurapo pitied them, and would bring fish to them every week.

=== Return to the Cook Islands ===
All this time, Ruatapu had been on Tongatapu waiting for Rangiura to return with news of a safe arrival to Rarotonga. Due to the amount of time that had passed, he feared the worst, and tracked down his eldest son Tamaiva to ask where Moenau and Rangiura were. Tamaiva, now an adult, told Ruatapu that he had indeed met Moenau long ago as a child, but sent him to Ngaputoru. This angered Ruatapu, who at once set out for Ma'uke Island where he found a group of children playing by the beach. One child was his grandson, Te Aukura, who told him that Moenau had been killed. Te Aukura brought Ruatapu to his mother Te Kaumarokura, who was with Taratekui and Taratekurapo. She told Ruatapu they were her relatives, not her husbands, and that they were looking after her and the child.

After Ruatapu had fallen asleep in their house, the warriors confessed to Te Kaumarokura that they feared him - surely he must be a great ariki, or even an atua, and begged her to not tell him what they did to his son, to which she agreed, so he could not avenge his son's death. The next morning, Ruatapu enquired about his son's death and whether he could take the child with him. Te Kaumarokura told him a half-truth; Moenau had 'fallen' into a cave at Makatea, and had not been slain. Te Aukura did not wish to go with him, which Ruatapu respected, saying that if he left the island, Moenau's name and lineage would be forgotten there.

Three days after leaving the island, Ruatapu finally met a fisherman who told him the truth of Moenau's death, as every other person on the island had been afraid of him. Ruatapu, though, said it was too late to turn around and kill them, for he had already left in peace. Alternatively, Te Aukura had told him on their first meeting what had happened to Moenau, and so he killed a large number of the island's inhabitants by rolling the logs of coconut trees atop of them from a higher place.

The next evening he arrived at Atiu Island and went ashore, meeting the ariki Chief Renga, who asked him to help improve a natural passage through a reef called Taunganui, and make it fit for canoes. Ruatapu agreed, but had to cut his time on Atiu short when he found there was not enough food for everybody on the island. Chief Renga gave him food and gifts for his next voyage; some coconuts, a kura bird, a moo bird, and the roots of the tiaré maori tree which grows sweet-smelling flowers. He also renamed his then-canoe from Te Kareroakite Enuamanu, to Tueumoana.

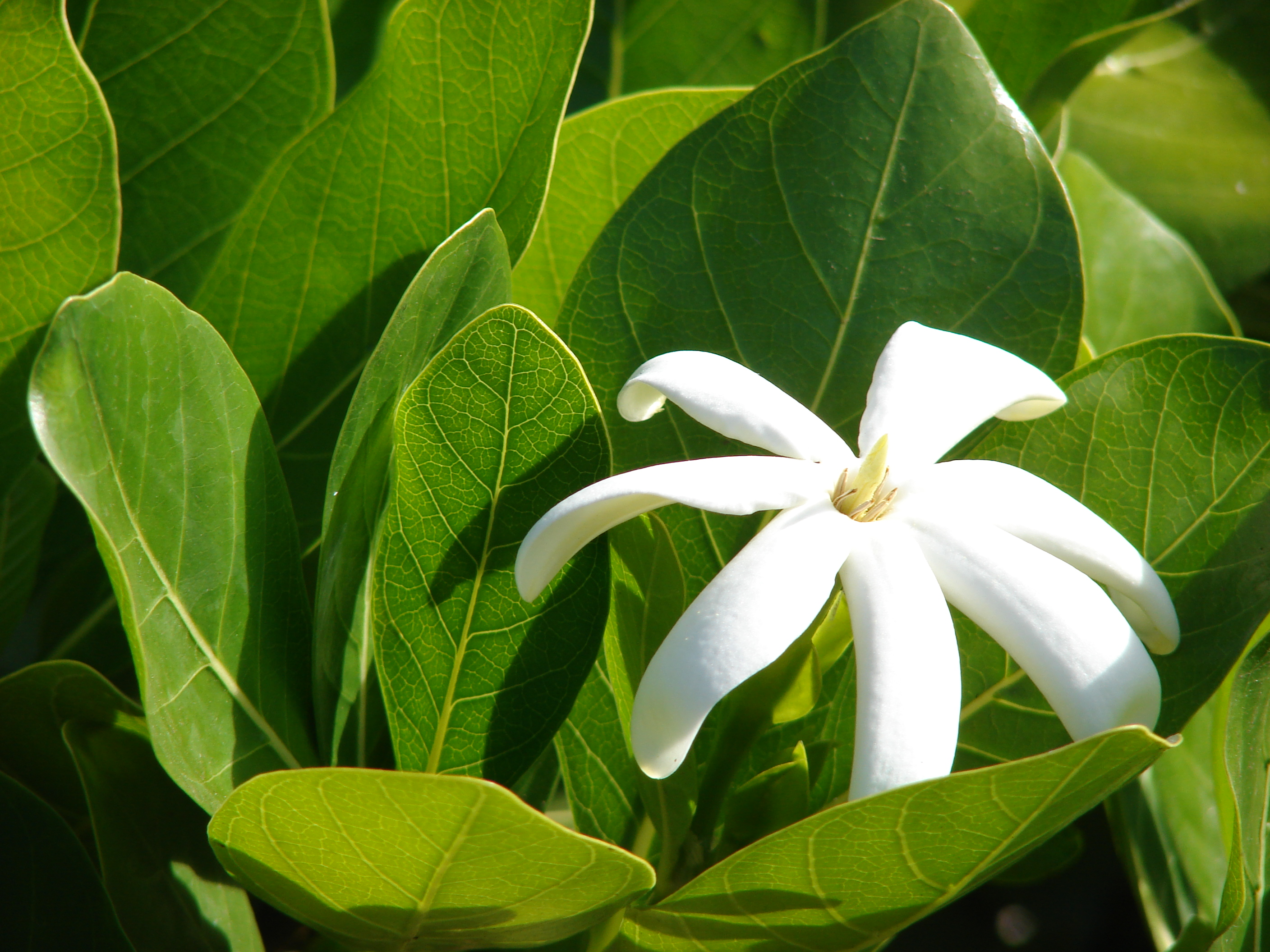
Tiaré maori tree at the Lahaina Aquatic Center. A specific tree that Ruatapu planted, Te tiaré a Ruatapu, is said to still be the largest of its species in the Cook Islands.

After three days of travel, Ruatapu found two large uninhabited islands sharing a lagoon, collectively naming the area Manuenua because of the large groups of tavake that were nesting there. He spent four days resting here, freeing the birds he was given, planting some of the tiaré maori roots and the coconut to grow a tree which he named Te Tuia Rongo, or Tuiorongo, and naming the planted tiaré maori roots (Te) Aravaine.

=== Settling at Aitutaki ===
Next, travelling west-north-west, he arrived at a lagoon with a number of small islands and one large island, where he passed through a small reef passage named Kopuaonu and stayed on Oaka Island, at the shingle spit called Te Okaokaanga-i-te niu-a Ruatapu. The next morning he found and ate a large unga slightly further inland, naming the spot Kaiunga. Next he planted the last of his tiaré maori root, naming it Ngaevaevaiteinaiteupoko-o Tapotuki Tongatapu after his second wife Tapotuki Tonga, or sometimes known as Te tiaré a Ruatapu. He then moved onto the mainland of this lagoon, naming the place where he landed Maitai, and moving slightly further inland he named Paengamanuiri after erecting an altar for the worship of 'evil' spirits, where the appellation of Vai-tiaré made out of tiaré flowers may still be seen today, and then moving even further in he built his marae called Aumatangi. This was all very near to a small settlement called Vaitupa, on the island of Ututakienuao Ru, today called Aitutaki. The ariki was Chief Taruia.

Finally he settled among the people of Vaitupa, taking Tutunoa as his wife, by whom he had four children. Two boys; Kirikava and Te Urutupui, a girl named Tongirau, and a boy named Touketa. Some traditions record that Te Arauenua was the secondborn son, while Tongirau may not be recorded.) When Kirikava had grown old enough, he asked his father to teach him fishing practices. So Ruatapu gathered the bark of an au tree and treated it with kiriau - a process of leaving it in the sea for a few days before bringing it to land, to keep it from rotting for about a year. He called the people of Vaitupa to help make the nets, as they had never had nets on the island before. Together they completed a small net called a tuturua, which Ruatapu gave to his son Te Urutupui. After completing a bigger net for Kirikava, the villagers were divided into two groups, one for each net.

Both nets caught great catches of fish each. Kirikava divided the big fish (and two turtles) amongst the men in his party, but forgetting to give some to his father, while Te Urutupui gave Ruatapu the finest fish of his catchment of small fish. By showing gratitude to his father in this action, he ensured his net would always catch many fish. The next time the nets were left and pulled out, the brothers did the same as before, Kirikava's actions only making Ruatapu angry for not following tapu traditions. Kirikava replied that because Ruatapu was an ariki, so too must he, and that since he was the master of his own net, he could decide what to do with it. This being the last straw, Ruatapu banished Kirikava from his house and disowned him, stating he would not be an ariki for very long. At this Kirikava left the home, and settled his own marae called Aputu and married Te Nonoioiva, with whom he had a son named Maevarangi. Te Urutupui also took Vainepuarangi as his own wife, both wives were brought to the island by one Ru. Tongirau married a man named Te Araroa, and had a child named Te Aunuio-ota, who Ruatapu would train in wrestling and spear-fighting.

Ruatapu grew older, and instructed Te Urutupui to take his wife to Manuenua where he could live as ariki. He gave them the canoe Tueumoana, and it took three days for them to arrive at the smaller island where Ruatapu had earlier planted the flowers and coconuts. They moved over to the bigger island and named it Te Auo Tepui.

Two years later, Rongovei arrived to Manuenua in his canoe, the Tanemaitai, and became very good friends with Te Urutupui, who told him to go back to the island of his father and bring back a wife and rule as ariki. This he did, landing at a passage called Ruaikakau near the settlement of Reureutematao Te Erui, where he took Tiapara and Punanga-atua as his wives before visiting Ruatapu to deliver news of his son. They returned to Manuenua and lived on the smaller island.

=== Becoming Ariki ===
One day, Ruatapu went up to the highest point of Aitutaki where he rested under an utu tree, out of anger towards his son Kirikava, in search of a new home. He rested under this tree at a spot which he called Teutumarama, before venturing further. Kirikava ran to catch up with him upon finding out he was gone, and begged Ruatapu not to leave. Ruatapu told him to leave, threatening to kill him with his spear and axe if he did not. Kirikava replied: “All right, my father, if it pleases you to kill your son, do so. I won’t try to stop you.” to which Ruatapu broke down and wept. He asked him to sit down so they could talk to each other, and they arranged two lines of black stones as they resolved their differences, calling the spot Te Ruatoke. Ruatapu instructed him to return home to Vaitupa where his brother and sister still lived, promising not to forget them if he became the ariki. This Kirikava did and Ruatapu continued on into the Arutanga district to a settlement called Anainga, where he found the people bringing food to the ariki, Chief Taruia. Ruatapu decided to take Taruia's place as ariki, and created a small model canoe called a kopae out of coconut leaves. He set it in the lagoon at Ruatea where one of Taruia's warriors caught it, and ran to show him, amazed and having never seen anything like it. Taruia, living at Orongo, said this was an akairo (sign) that another ariki was present on the island and that his people should find this ariki somewhere at a place called Te Upokoenua in the northern end of the island, where indeed Ruatapu was found sitting in the sand, and was brought back to Taruia via an inland route as opposed to by the coast, else the god Rongo would devour him. Upon arrival, Taruia insisted Ruatapu stay with him and accept food.

Some days later Ruatapu suggested they dam a small creek named (Vai)Reirei from running into the ocean, wasting fresh water. This was a contest of skill, which Ruatapu completed under two days, successfully damming the creek. A second challenge which Ruatapu suggested, was to see who could build a canoe the fastest before travelling to other islands. Taruia asked what purpose there would be in travelling, as all islands were about the same anyway, and no more exciting than Aitutaki. At this Ruatapu laughed, saying there were many bigger islands, and some with beautiful women of much lighter complexion - some almost white - and with a brighter hair tone, all of this sounded much better to Taruia than what his island already offered. Once again, Ruatapu proved to be the more skilled ariki, completing his canoe first and calling it Te Atua-apaipai.

Ruatapu brought the canoe down to the lagoon, and said he'd venture out in the morning. Taruia asked him not to go as his own canoe was almost finished, and they could go together. Ruatapu would not agree to this at first, saying he would go first and call back out to Taruia from Rarotonga. Afterwards, he agreed to wait until the day after to give Taruia time to finish the canoe.

On the day they were ready, Ruatapu set out his canoe two hours ahead of Taruia, and intentionally capsized it knowing Taruia would find him in the water. This happened near a small island named Mainainara, and the exact spot where it happened was named Raukuruvaka, or Raukuraka. It was not long before Taruia found him and Ruatapu pleaded for his help. Taruia laughed at him, telling him that he instead would wait in Rarotonga and call back out to Ruatapu, just as he said he would to Taruia. He laughed again before sailing away out of sight. Ruatapu quickly righted his canoe and headed back for Aitutaki, calling all the mataipo together and telling the people that he did not know whether Taruia was alive. The people agreed that Ruatapu should become Aitutaki's new ariki.

Taruia, having safely landed at Avarua in Rarotonga, slowly began to realise what Ruatapu had done, and feared he had stolen the title of ariki from him. He gathered some strong men from amongst his new friends at Rarotonga and sailed back to reclaim his position. The people of Aitutaki saw Taruia's war party heading back near Tapuotuki, and Ruatapu decided to engage them in a fight, so they battled at the Ruaikakau passage, in the water. Taruia and his people withdrew and travelled for three weeks to another island, Māngarongaro, where Taruia's descendants still live today. In some traditions, his early descendant Urirau returned to Aitutaki and reclaimed the position of ariki through his success in performing a ritual at the marae of Rongo.

Ruatapu, now an old man with death closing in on him, sent for his son Kirikava to come live with him in the chief's house - Paepaeoronga - and become the new ariki upon his death. Soon, news came from Ruatapu's home village Taputapuatea that a new warrior named Tuotakura had become known amongst many islands as talented in martial arts skills such as wrestling and spear-fighting. He lived on the island of Tahiti. Since Kirikava had disobeyed his father when he was younger, he could not take on this warrior. However after much convincing, Ruatapu allowed for his people to build Kirikava a canoe to take him to Tahiti.

In a few days after arriving at Tahiti, he had watched other young warriors duel with Tuotakura, and knew he would be no match. Indeed, he proved to be no match in a contest of wrestling, and went home ashamed. This defeat, which Ruatapu could not correct himself as he was too old, depressed him so much that it sent him into bad health, and before long he had died, making Kirikava the new ariki of Aitutaki.

== Māori traditions ==
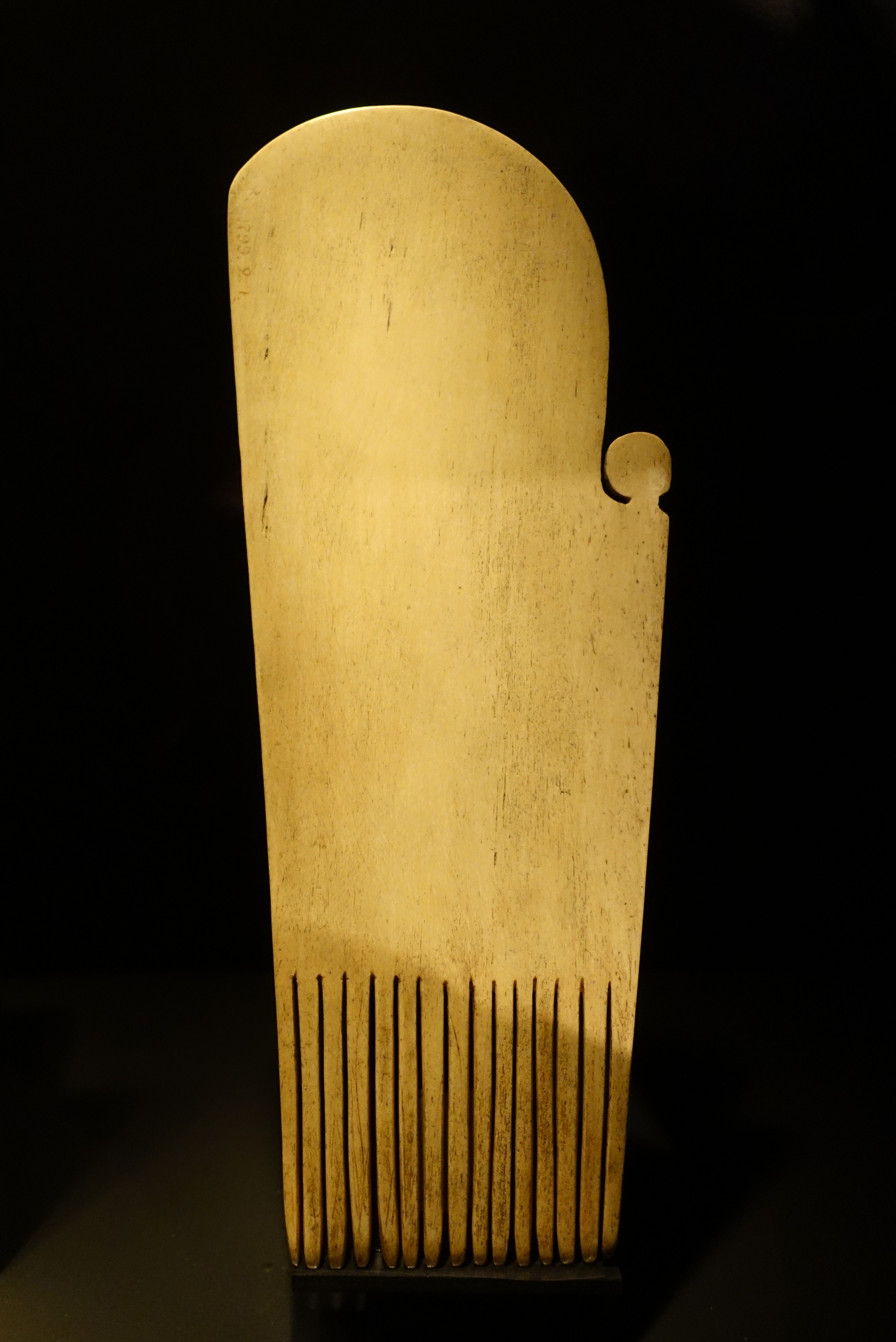
A Māori whalebone comb at Etnografiska museet, collected by Captain James Cook - so often, the denial of a sacred comb is the catalyst for Ruatapu's revenge.

In the Māori traditions of Ruatapu's life, he is always a son of Chief Uenuku, ariki of Hawaiki, and is belittled by him for being his only son born of a slave wife, and therefore being unable to use a sacred comb in his hair. With the exception of Paikea, Ruatapu kills Hawaiki's nobility aboard a canoe in every telling. The story is particularly well-known to tribes that originated in the Gisborne District such as Ngāti Porou, Ngāti Kahungunu, and Ngāi Tahu, and especially Ngāti Porou's hapū Ngāti Konohi.

In one telling of the legend, Ruatapu had been belittled by Uenuku for using the sacred comb of his elder brother, Kahutiaterangi. As revenge, Ruatapu enticed most of Uenuku's children into his canoe, sailed them to the ocean, and then sank it in an event called Te Huripureiata. Kahutiaterangi survived with the help of a whale and was thereafter known as Paikea. Meanwhile, Ruatapu convinced the gods of the tides to destroy the land and its inhabitants. Paikea fled to high ground and was saved through the intervention of the goddess Moakuramanu. One version of the myth holds that Ruatapu drowned in the flood and that his bowels became the first jellyfish, or the rebuke came when Ruatapu dared to walk on the roof of Uenuku's house.

Another telling says that Ruatapu used Uenuku's own hairpiece, believing himself to be the senior son, as the eldest, when in fact Kahutiaterangi was the senior son owing to a difference in lineage. Ruatapu then went away and built his own large canoe that could hold 140 people. Once finished he announced that he would set off in it, and then killed everyone aboard with a spear, save for Paikea, who took to the ocean and was saved by the gods.

In yet another telling says that Chief Uenuku made a canoe for the nobility and was preparing the hair of all 70 of his noble children for their first sail inside of it. Uenuku himself, combed, oiled, and tied the hair of every last one of them, except Ruatapu. When Ruatapu asked why his father had not treated his hair, Uenuku told him he could not because he was the only son of a slave woman, and his hair was not tapu like his brothers'. This put Ruatapu to shame, and so he refused to eat dinner that night, instead going down to the canoe and putting a hole in its bottom, before filling it with wood chips and hiding the canoe's bailer. In the morning when they launched the canoe, Ruatapu hid the hole with his heel. When they were far out at sea he released the hole and removed the chips. The water rushed in, and nobody could find the bailer as Ruatapu had hidden it onshore. Everybody drowned, except Paikea, who was saved through his mother's ancestor Tangaroa who summoned the whale. Ruatapu's last attempt at killing Paikea was to use an incantation to hurl waves at him. This backfired as Paikea was too far away now, and the waves just rolled back onto Ruatapu thus drowning him.

=== Ngāti Porou tradition ===
In a tradition of Ngāti Porou, Ruatapu became angry when his father Uenuku elevated his younger half-brother Kahutiaterangi ahead of him in status. Ruatapu lured Kahutiaterangi and a large number of young men of high birth into his canoe, and took them out to sea where he drowned them. He called on the gods to destroy his enemies and threatened to return as the great waves of early summer, shouting out to Kahutiaterangi that he would return to fight him: "The great waves of the eighth month, they are me! I am then approaching!" In an endnote, Reedy writes:

In the eighth month of the Māori calendar, in the early summer, large waves known as ngā tai o Rangawhenua, Rangawhenua's waves, sometimes break upon the shore on the East Coast. In this episode Ruatapu announces that in the eighth month he will take this form, and follow Paikea.

Such accounts or conclusions may result from Christian influence, inspired by the Genesis flood narrative. The eighth month of the Māori calendar is Kohitātea (December–January) according to Ngāi Tūhoe.
