= Lake Ngaroto =

Lake in New Zealand

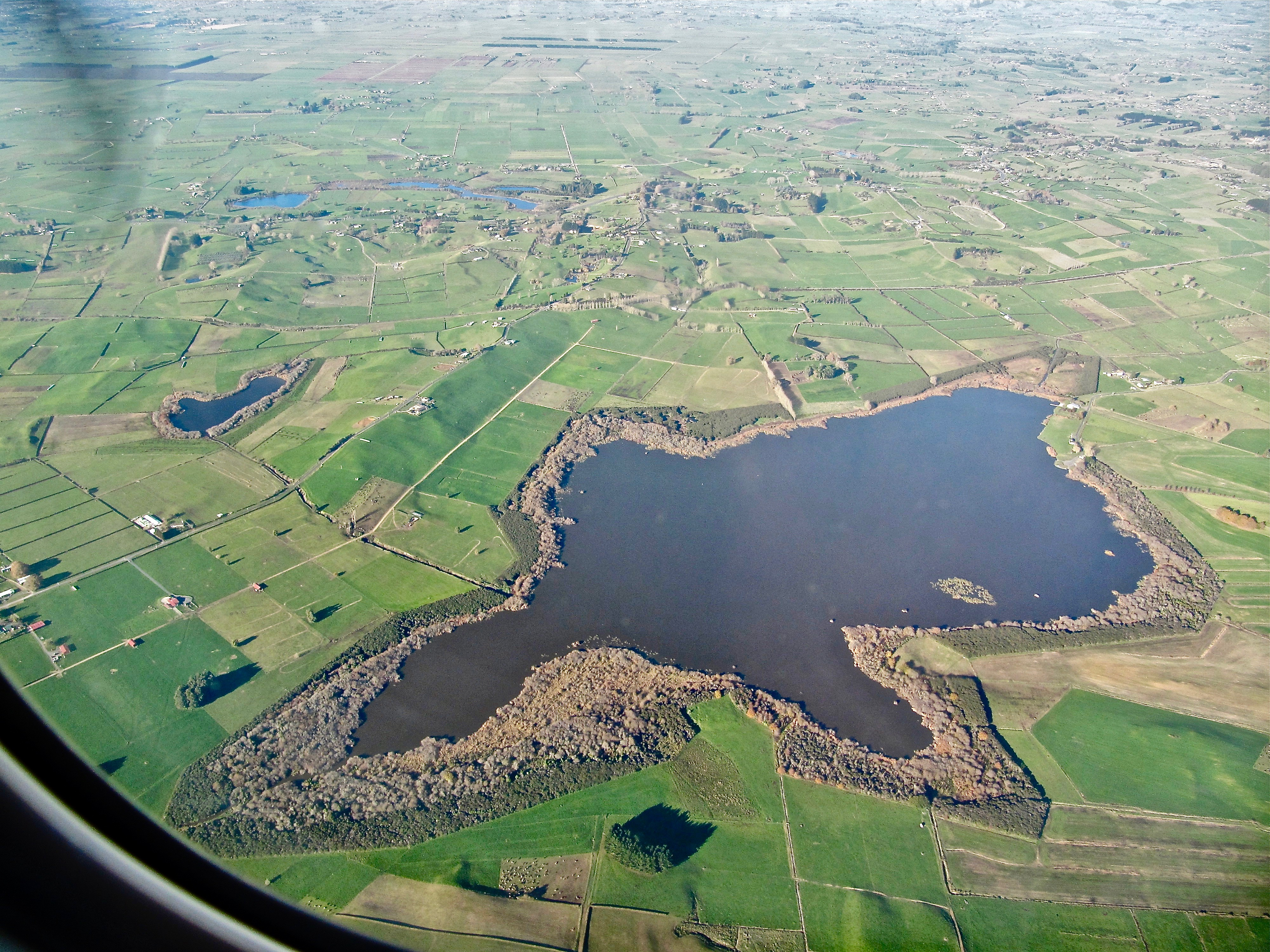
- Lake Ngaroto in 2009, as seen from an aircraft approaching Hamilton airport, with Lake Ngarotoiti to the north (left) and Lake Serpentine (Rotopiko) to the east (top)

- Location within North Island
- Location: North Island
- Coordinates: 37°57′24″S 175°17′17″E
- Type: peat
- Basin countries: New Zealand
- Max. length: 1.7 km (1.1 mi)
- Max. width: 0.8 km (0.50 mi)
- Surface area: 108 ha (270 acres)
- Average depth: 2 m (6 ft 7 in)
- Max. depth: 4 m (13 ft)
- Surface elevation: 34 m (112 ft)

Lake Ngaroto is a peat lake in Waipa District of New Zealand.

Located 19 km south of Hamilton and 8 km north-west of Te Awamutu, it has a surface area of 108 ha (270 acres), making it the largest of the Waipa peat lakes.

The New Zealand Ministry for Culture and Heritage gives a translation of "the lakes" for Ngāroto.

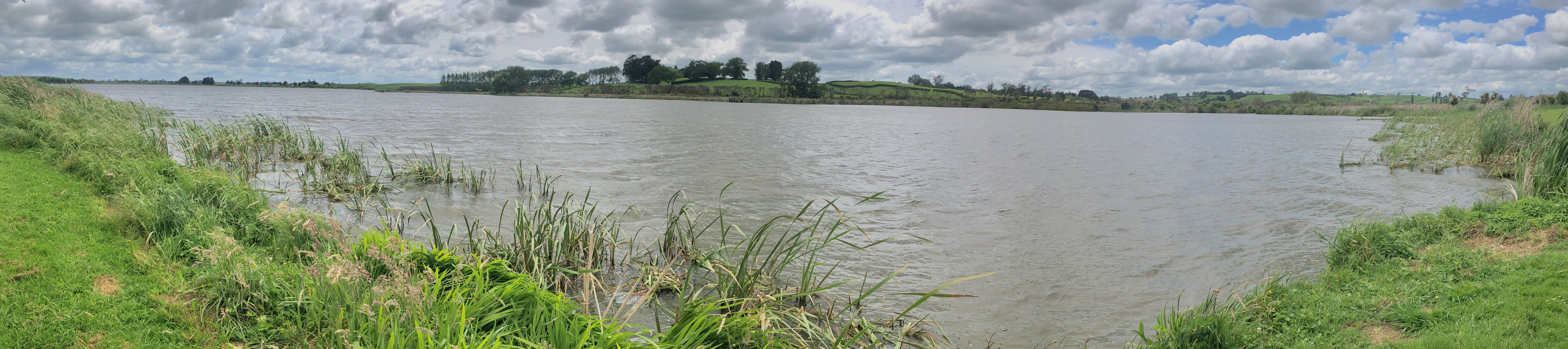
Lake Ngaroto in 2020 from south

== History ==
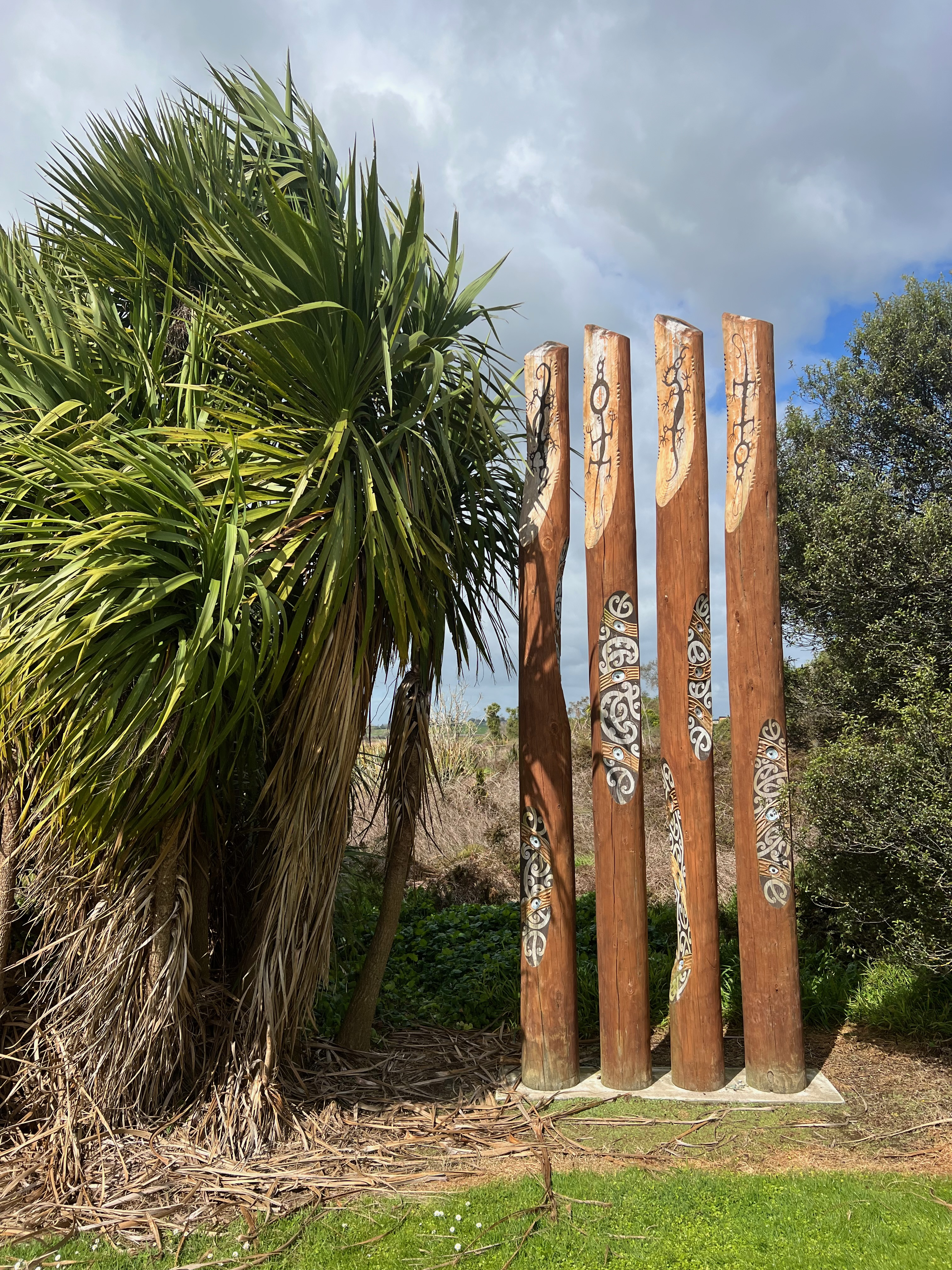
Lake Ngāroto 2016 pou, representing 7 atua (gods) and lizards

The Battle of Hingakaka was fought nearby, and the sacred carving Te Uenuku lost at this time. It was re-discovered in 1906, and now resides in the Te Awamutu Museum. In 2016 a pou, representing 7 atua, was erected near the spot where Te Uenuku is thought to have been found.

The Ngaroto Drainage Board was formed in 1898. By 1928 hundreds of acres, formerly lake-bed, had been drained.

Restoration of the lake began in 1995.

== Pollution ==
The lake is hypertrophic, leading to eutrophication. It has very high levels of nutrients, microscopic algae and suspended sediment and its water clarity is low and decreasing by around 10 cm (3.9 in) a year. A health warning was issued in 2020 for cyanobacteria. Cyanobacteria killed fish and birds in 2022. The lake is now monitored by a harmful algal bloom indicator, a buoy to measure pigment produced by the cyanobacteria and satellite imagery.

== Recreation ==
- Power boats are banned from the lake, so Lake Ngaroto is popular for sailing and rowing.
- During the New Zealand Duck Shooting Season (May and June), the lake is used for duck shooting.
- Waipa District council has constructed a 6km track around the lake, part gravel and part boardwalk. It is popular with walkers and runners and recreational cyclists. There are several public toilets.
- A Te Awamutu-Ngā Roto-Pirongia cycleway is planned, but two land purchases have delayed it.

== See also ==
Ngaroto railway station
