= Murupaenga =

Murupaenga (c. 1770 – 1826) was a tribal leader and war leader of the Ngāti Rango (or Ngāti Rongo) hapū (subtribe) of the Ngāti Whātua iwi in New Zealand. He was born possibly about 1770. He was a leader of Ngāti Whātua in many battles, including assisting Waikato and Ngāti Maniapoto to defeat a huge Ngāti Toa and Ngāti Raukawa-led army in the Battle of Hingakaka in about 1807, and the defeat of Ngāpuhi forces in the Te Kai-a-te-karoro battle at Moremonui in 1807 or 1808, soon after Hingakaka. Ngāti Rango lived in the South Kaipara area, and Murupaenga lived at Makarau, north of Kaukapakapa, during the time when he was most prominent.
