= Pikauterangi =

New Zealand Māori chief (fl. 1780)

Pikauterangi (died c. 1807) was a New Zealand Māori tribal leader. He was the paramount chief of Ngāti Toa in the late 18th and/or early 19th century. He led Ngāti Toa into battle and defeat, beginning their exodus south.

== Life ==
Pikauterangi was the eldest son of chief Te Maunu. He married Te Kahurangi and Nihoniho, two sisters who, along with their elder brother Wharerau, were from the Ngāti Kurī hapū of Ngāti Toa. Their children became important chiefs in Ngāti Toa also. Te Pēhi Kupe was a grandson.

In 1807 or thereabouts, Pikauterangi led the unsuccessful Ngāti Toa invasion of the Waikato and Waipā, in the Battle of Hingakākā, reputedly the largest battle ever in New Zealand. Pikauterangi raised an army of 10,000 warriors against Te Rauangaanga (father of the first Māori king Pōtatau Te Wherowhero), who rallied 3,000 fighters from Waikato Tainui and Ngāti Maniapoto to defend their home territories against the invasion. Pikauterangi was killed by Te Rauangaanga in the battle and Ngāti Toa and their allies were defeated.
