= Pokaia =

Pokaia (died 1807) was a Ngāpuhi chief from Northland, New Zealand. He was killed in an ambush by the Ngāti Whātua at the battle of Moremonui, where the Ngāpuhi use of muskets marked the first occasion Māori used firearms in warfare. Pokaia's sister Te Kona was the mother of Hōne Heke.
