= Battle of Moremonui =

Battle fought in 19th century New Zealand

Coordinates: 35°53′49″S 173°41′37″E

- Part of the Musket Wars
| Date | 1807 or 1808 |
| Location | Ripirō Beach, north of Dargaville, Northland, New Zealand |
| Result | Ngāti Whātua victory |

Belligerents
| Ngāpuhi | Ngāti Whātua; Te Roroa |

Commanders and leaders
| Pokaia † | Murupaenga; Tāoho; Tuwhare |

Strength
| Total: 500 toa (warriors): Several armed with muskets | Total: Unknown |

Casualties and losses
| Total: 150–300 | Total: Unknown but probably minor |

The Battle of Moremonui (Māori: Te Haenga o te One, lit. 'The Marking of the Sand', or Te Kai-a-te-Karoro, lit. 'The Seagulls' Feast') was fought between Ngāti Whātua and Ngāpuhi, two Māori iwi (tribes), in northern New Zealand in 1807 or 1808. The Ngāpuhi force had a few muskets, making this the first occasion Māori used muskets in warfare. The Ngāti Whātua force ambushed the Ngāpuhi, and won the battle, which occurred at Moremonui Gully where it enters Ripirō Beach, 19 kilometres (12 miles) south of Maunganui Bluff on the west coast of Northland. It could reasonably be called the first battle of the Musket Wars among Māori, which took place over the following few decades.

== Background ==
The battle of Moremonui was preceded by skirmishes in 1806 between Ngāpuhi in the north, led by one of their rangatira (chiefs), Pokaia, on one side, and Kaipara subtribes of Ngāti Whātua in the south on the other. The southern groups were led by Tāoho, rangatira of Te Roroa, and Murupaenga, rangatira of the Ngāti Rongo subtribe of Ngāti Whātua.

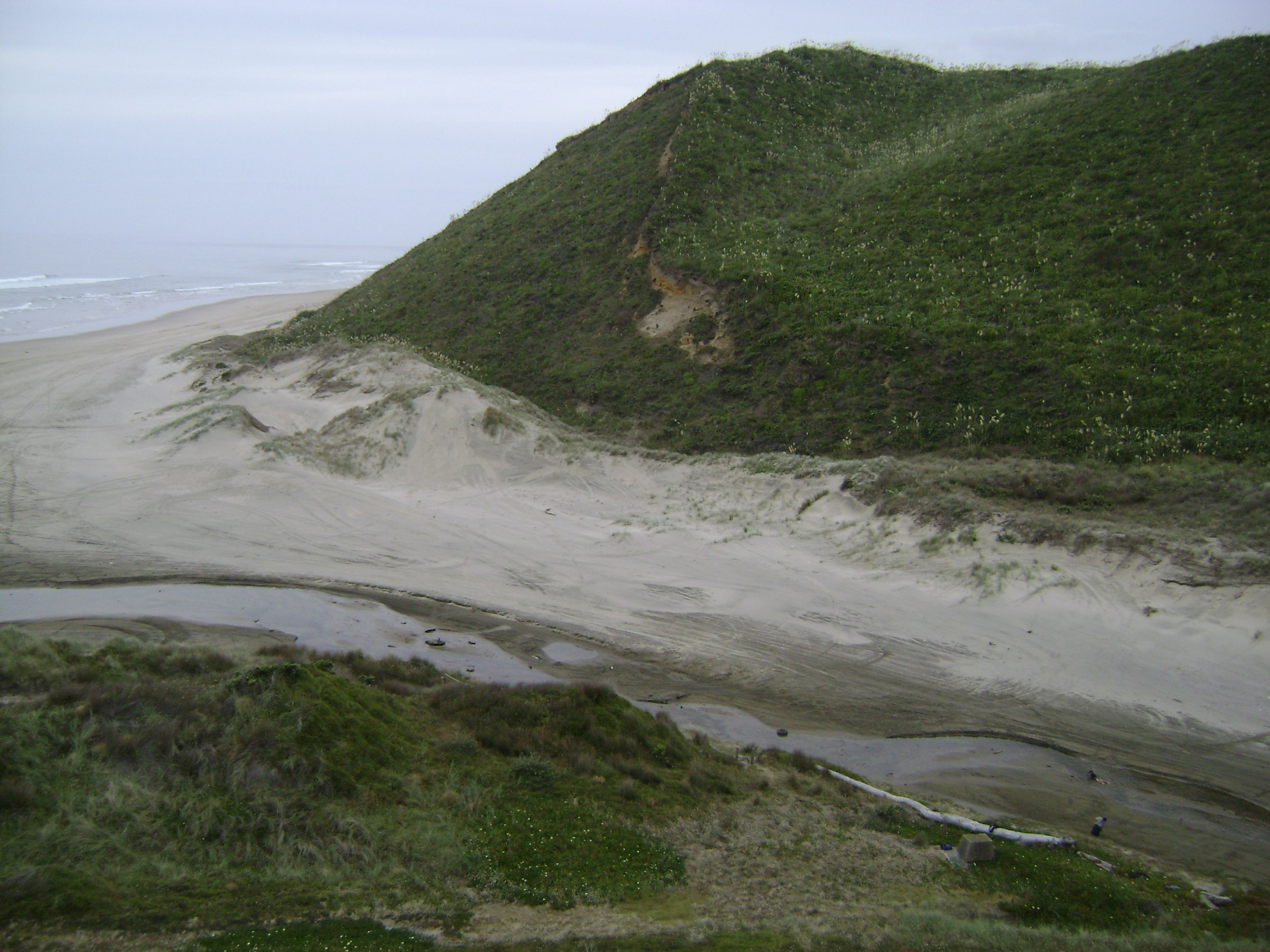
The mouth of Moremonui Gully viewed from the southern side, with battle monument at lower right

In 1807, Pokaia proposed that Ngāpuhi mount a major war expedition against Te Roroa. About 500 Ngāpuhi warriors, most from the Kaikohe area and a few from the Hokianga, assembled under Pokaia. In response to Ngāpuhi preparations, Ngāti Whātua forces assembled under Tāoho, Murupaenga, Te Wana-a-riri of Ngāti Whātua, and Te Hekeua of Te Uri-o-Hau, intending to meet the Ngāpuhi before they reached the northern Kaipara. Both sides were armed with the usual striking weapons, but the first European settlement had recently formed at Kororāreka in Ngāpuhi territory, and a few of the Ngāpuhi warriors had acquired muskets.

== The battle ==
The Ngāpuhi force came down the west coast and camped north of Maunganui Bluff. Alerted that they intended to proceed down Ripirō Beach at night to camp at Moremonui, the Ngāti Whātua got there first and hid in the Moremonui valley. The unsuspecting Ngāpuhi arrived at Moremonui at dawn and prepared a meal. While they were eating, Ngāti Whātua launched a surprise attack. The Ngāpuhi scrambled for their weapons and were driven to the beach, where the battle continued for some time. The Ngāpuhi muskets were useful, but loading and reloading them took time, and their numbers were not sufficient. Eventually Tāoho killed the Ngāpuhi leader Pokaia with his mere and the Ngāpuhi fled. Tāoho had connections with Ngāpuhi and, not wishing to completely annihilate them, ordered that a line be drawn in the sand of the beach, beyond which Ngāti Whātua warriors were not to pursue them.

== Aftermath ==
Ngāpuhi acknowledged the death of 150 of their party of 500, but other reports of their loss ranged up to 300. Among the dead were Hongi Hika's older brother Houwawe, his half-brother Hau Moka, and his sister Waitapu, whose body was mutilated to symbolise stopping the line of descent. Hongi Hika himself escaped, as did Kawiti, another Ngāpuhi leader, due to Tāoho's restraint in stopping further pursuit. So numerous were the bodies left on the beach and eaten by gulls, the battle was called Te Kai a te Karoro (the Feast of the Black-backed Gull). This battle is also known as Te Haerenga-o-te-one (the Marking of the sand), named after Te Uri o Hau chief Tieke's act of drawing a line in the sand.

Although only a small number of firearms were used, Moremonui could reasonably be called the first battle of the Musket Wars, as a thirst for utu (justice through revenge) motivated Hongi Hika's campaigns against the Ngāti Whātua over the next twenty years.
