= St Paul's Church, Hairini =

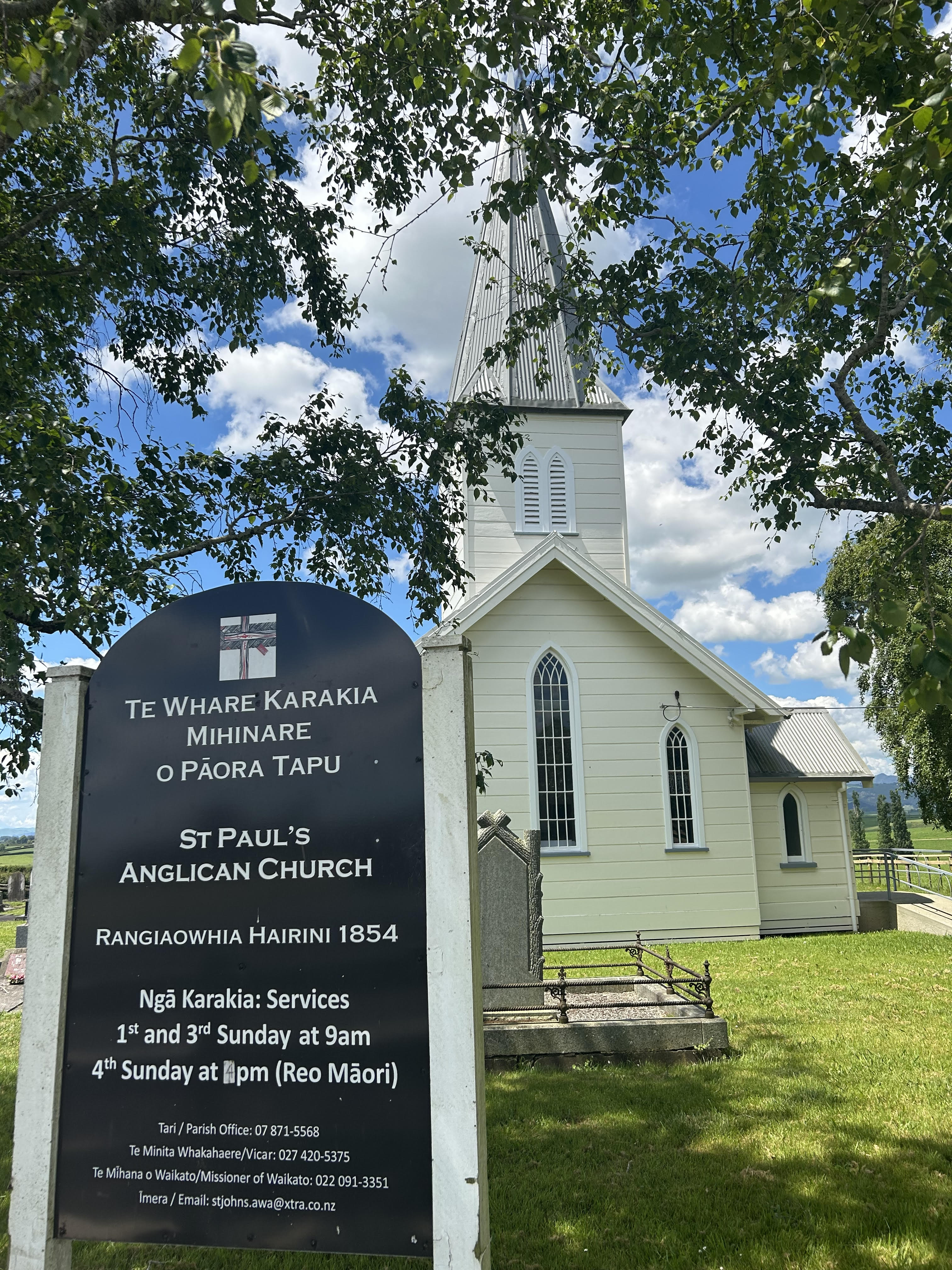
- St Paul's Church at Hairini
- St Paul's Church, Hairini
- 38°00′51.92″S 175°22′36.55″E
- Location: 87 Rangiaowhia Road, Te Awamutu
- Country: New Zealand
- Denomination: Anglican

Architecture
- Functional status: Active
- Architect: John Morgan
- Architectural type: Church
- Style: Gothic Revival
- Years built: 1854

Administration
- Province: Anglican Church in Aotearoa, New Zealand and Polynesia
- Diocese: Waikato and Taranaki
- Parish: St John's Parish, Te Awamutu

Heritage New Zealand – Category 1
- Official name: St Paul's Church (Anglican)
- Designated: 6 June 1983
- Reference no.: 27

St Paul's Church is a heritage-listed Anglican church at Hairini, near Te Awamutu in the Waikato region of New Zealand. It served as the Anglican church for the now defunct Rangiaowhia village. Built in 1854 in the Gothic Revival style, the building was designed by Reverend John Morgan of the Church Missionary Society. The second oldest surviving building in the Waikato, the church was registered by the New Zealand Historic Places Trust as a Category I building in 1983.

== Background ==
The Church Missionary Society (CMS) had been spreading Christianity among the Māori people of the central Waikato region of New Zealand since the late 1830s. Reverend John Morgan had established a mission in 1841 at Te Awamutu, then known as Ōtāwhao, and in 1849 he sought funds from the CMS headquarters in London to replace the existing chapels, made of raupō, at his mission and that of Rangiaowhia, about 6 kilometres (3.7 mi) to the east, with more formal timber churches. This request, and others submitted by Morgan over the next three years were declined. In the interim, a Catholic church was erected at Rangiaowhia. Morgan used this development to incentivise the CMS, pointing out the advantage that this gave the Catholic Church in the region.

Finally, in 1852, CMS headquarters made £200 available, to be split evenly between both churches. However, the Central Committee of the CMS in New Zealand, which had approval of the usage of the funds, recommended this be put towards the church at Rangiaowhia. This was a disappointment to Morgan who wanted to prioritise the church for Ōtāwhao. He sought a reconsideration of the decision and in March 1853, he finally received permission to proceed with the Ōtāwhao church. Once that building, consecrated as St John's Church, was completed, construction commenced at Rangiaowhia.

== Construction and design ==
While awaiting the outcome of his request for a reconsideration of which church to prioritise for construction, Morgan had cleared the site at Rangiaowhia and sourced mataī timber. The building of what was to become St Paul's Church commenced in earnest in about April–May 1854. It was completed and being used for services later that year although the exact date of its opening is not known. The CMS funds paid for about a third of the overall construction cost, with the balance coming from donations from the local population, both Māori and settlers.

Designed by Morgan in a Gothic Revival style, St Paul's Church was built by English carpenters, William Chitham and John Edwards, who worked with Māori labourers. It was proportionally similar to St John's, the church Morgan had built at Ōtāwhao, although it was a little smaller. It consisted of a bell tower, a nave with dimensions of 16.7 metres (55 ft) by 10.6 metres (35 ft), and a chancel with dimensions of 4.4 metres (14 ft) by 3.3 metres (11 ft). Its roof, supported by a series of king post trusses, was clad with wooden shingles, although these were later replaced with sheets of corrugated galvanised iron. Lancet windows are provided to the walls, with two of them provided with stained glass. A steeple was added in 1858, its construction being attended to by a CMS teacher, Taati Te Waru. The steeple was of square form, with a pair of lancet windows, and topped by a broach spire. A porch was added to the south side of the building in 1901.

The interior of St Paul's Church is lined with kauri timber. It has one of the oldest stained glass windows in the country. Installed into the east wall of the building, the window dates to around 1856, possible one or two years earlier. It has a central pane which depict Paul the Apostle with a sword and book. The left pane has a quatrefoil with a representation of the blinded Elymas, while the right pane also has a quatrefoil which shows Paul the Apostle throwing a serpent into fire. Decorative elements are provided above and below the quatrefoils of the left and right panes.

== History ==
By the time of the construction of St Paul's, Rangiaowhia was a major source of food crops, with orchards and fields of wheat and corn surrounding it and Otawhao. There was much trade with Auckland. The region soon became a supply centre for the tribes, which supported the Māori King movement. As the movement sought to unify the Māori tribes, this was a threat to the colonial government. In July 1863, the British Army mounted an invasion of the Waikato and by the following February, the invasion force was approaching the valuable farming land around Ōtāwhao. On 21 February, they secured Ōtāwhao, which was largely unoccupied. They then advanced on and attacked Rangiaowhia, which was only lightly defended with many women and children present. About 24 Māori were killed or wounded during the attack and another 33 taken prisoner. Many Māori sheltered in St Paul's Church for protection. The British subsequently withdrew to Ōtāwhao.

After the attack of 21 February, Rangiaowhia was abandoned. However, St Paul's Church continued to be used by the local Māori although Morgan by this time had left the area. Pastoral care was provided by priests visiting from Auckland until 1874, when Reverend L. Brady was appointed vicar of the area. In the interim, the building began to suffer from lack of maintenance but by 1875 remedial work had been completed. It was briefly used as a school while a bespoke building for what became the local government school was built.

In 1910, it was discovered that the building had shifted on its piles as a result of a strong gale. This led to it being slightly relocated on new foundations. The spire had also been damaged around this time but was not repaired for a number of years. Renovation work was carried out in 1926 and again in 1954, a hundred years after the building was first used for church services. Further work was completed by the New Zealand Historic Places Trust in 1973 and in the mid-1980s, the latter involving a complete re-pile of the building. It was fully repainted and its interior refurbished.

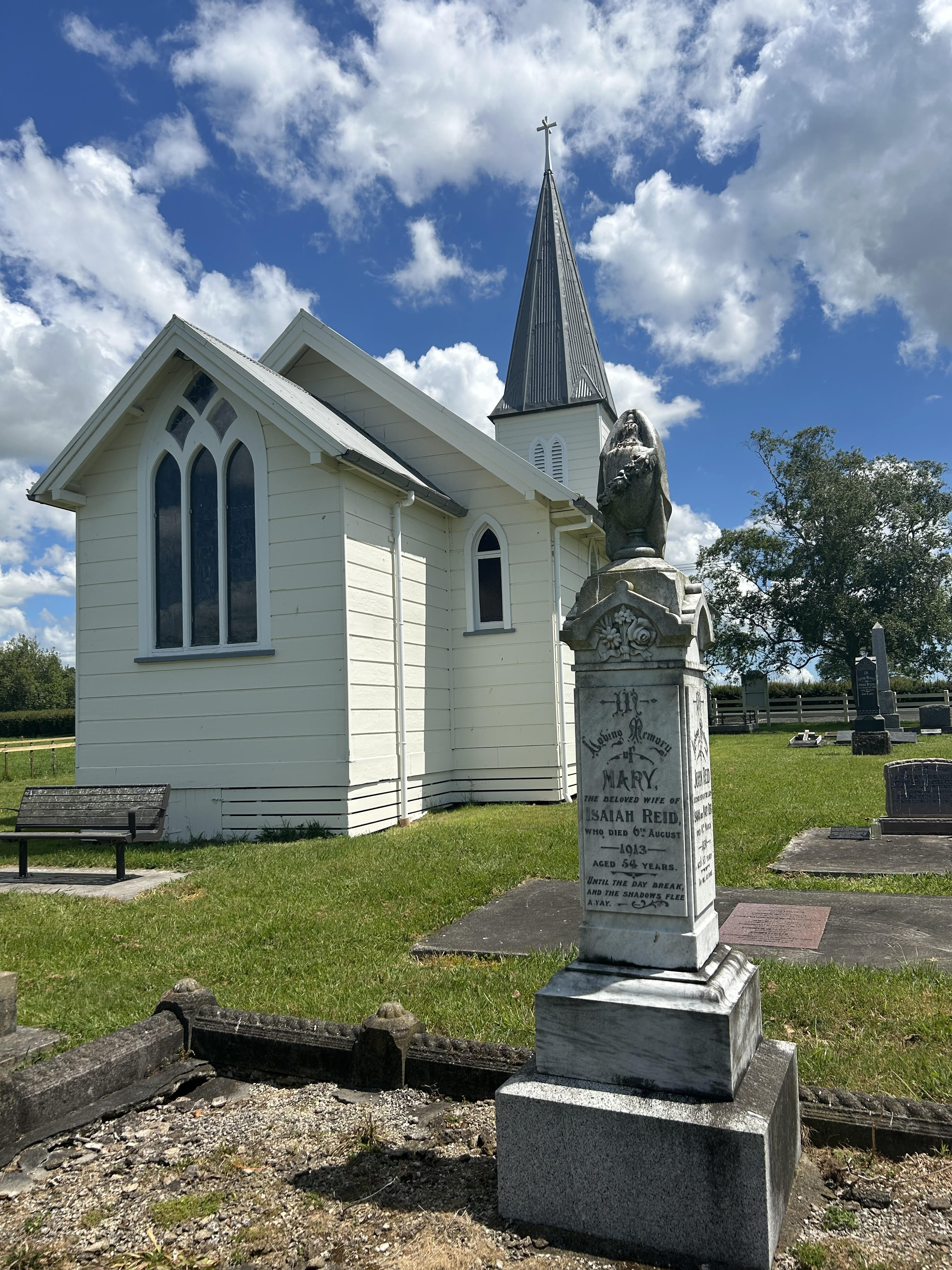
The northeast corner of St Paul's Church

== Legacy ==
St Paul's Church, also known as Te Whare Karakia Miniare o Pāora Tapu in te reo, remains in a rural setting with livestock grazing the adjacent field and is the only structure still extant from the former village of Rangiaowhia; the area is also known as Hairini. It was listed as a Historic Place Category 1 on 1 June 1983. A factor in its heritage listing is the age of the building, which is the second oldest in the Waikato, and its connections to the early missionary work of the CMS in the area. The church, part of the St John's Parish of the Diocese of Waikato and Taranaki, is still in use.
