= Jean Étienne Pezant =

French missionary (1811–1880)

Jean Étienne Pezant (1811–1880) was a French priest and missionary to New Zealand. He was born in Chanonat, near Clermont-Ferrand, France in 1811. In New Zealand, he signed documents as John Stephen Pezant.

He served in Tauranga, Matamata and Rangiaowhia. He retired in Blenheim, and was buried in Picton.
