= Lloyd Mandeno =

New Zealand electrical engineer (1888–1973)

Lloyd Mandeno OBE (3 October 1888 – 30 December 1973) was a New Zealand electrical engineer, inventor and local politician. He was born in Rangiaowhia, Waikato, New Zealand, on 3 October 1888. He is credited with nine hydroelectric installations and numerous inventions. He served on electric power boards, regional councils and as a deputy mayor.

Mandeno was born at Rangiaowhia, near Te Awamutu in the Waikato region to a farming family. He studied at St John's Collegiate School in Auckland and started at Auckland University College in 1905. The following year he transferred to Canterbury College from where he graduated in 1912 with a Bachelor of Engineering degree. He married Constance Mary Woodward at Mangere in 1913.

Mandeno invented, developed and successfully promoted widespread use of "single wire earth-return" (SWER) grids for rural electrification in New Zealand. This form of grid uses only a single wire, and made rural electrification dramatically more affordable and commonplace. It improves the standard of living of rural families. SWER is now used in many countries, including Australia, Canada, Brazil and some parts of the United States. In New Zealand, SWER is sometimes called "Mandeno's clothesline."

Mandeno was Chief Electrical Engineer at Frankton Power Station from 1913 to 1916. He promoted all-electric buildings, and invented, then improved an early electric storage water heater. He was a very early user of prefabricated steel poles. He invented molds to cast concrete poles on site. At Kaikohe he used New Zealand's first pole-erecting machine. On Urupukapuka Island in the Bay of Islands, he installed a submarine cable to Zane Grey’s fishing camp. He arranged the North Island's first electric milking shed and sawmill. Chateau Tongariro and its ski-lifts were powered by his systems. He developed high-pressure hot-water systems for Auckland and Tauranga hospitals.

Mandeno served on the Tauranga Electric Power Board. In 1926, Mandeno was accused of a conflict of interest by Tauranga's Mayor, Bradshaw Dive. Mandeno entered private practice at this time. Near this time, his health also declined from a digestive complaint, and he lost about 20 kg (40 lb) on a liquid diet which he maintained for several years.

From 1931 to 1956, Mandeno was on the One Tree Hill Borough Council. He was deputy mayor from 1944 to 1956.

His can-do attitude was cited. At Lake Taupō in 1962, he installed the Kuratau hydro station. The rocky gorge was discovered to be unstable after the lake had already begun to fill. On a very tight schedule, he designed a new rock-filled dam. When contractors refused to tender, he raced the waters, supervising construction himself.

By the end of his career he had designed and constructed nine hydroelectric power stations. A history of WEL Networks describes his distinguished career designing and building hydro power stations.

In the 1965 Queen's Birthday Honours, Mandeno was appointed an Officer of the Order of the British Empire, for services to engineering.

In 1970, his wife Constance died. In 1973, Lloyd Mandeno died. He was survived by his three children - all sons.
