= Peter Dmytruk =

Canadian Air Force officer

Peter Dmytruk (May 27, 1920 in Radisson, Saskatchewan – December 9, 1943 at Les Martres-de-Veyre, Puy-de-Dôme, Auvergne Province, Occupied France) was a Sergeant in the Royal Canadian Air Force who was killed fighting with the French Resistance during World War II.

== Life ==
Peter Dmytruk was born in Radisson, Saskatchewan in 1920 to a Ukrainian immigrant family. At the outbreak of World War II, Peter Dmytruk was living in Wynyard, Saskatchewan when he joined the Royal Canadian Air Force in July 1941. Following his training, he was shipped overseas where he served as a Halifax tail gunner with 405 Squadron RCAF. During a mission over France, just east of Paris, Flight Sergeant Dmytruk's plane was hit by German anti-aircraft fire. He survived the crash and after hiding in the woods, he was protected by locals who put him in touch with members of the French Underground. Dmytruk was led south through German-occupied France towards the escape route through the Pyrenees into Spain. Along the way, he was deeply impacted by the plight of the French people under Nazi occupation and chose not to be smuggled out of the country. Instead, he joined the French Resistance, which dubbed him, "Pierre le Canadien."

Peter Dmytruk's duties for the Resistance brought him to the small village of Les Martres-de-Veyre, about 15 kilometers south of Clermont-Ferrand where he gained a reputation amongst his French colleagues as a fearless fighter, undeterred by the ever-present danger. Following the sabotage of a German troop and munitions train, the Germans sent troops into Les Martres-de-Veyre. Normally, the usual Wehrmacht reprisal for such sabotage incidents involved executing all the men in the village. However, on December 9, 1943, Peter Dmytruk was arrested and because it was believed that the notorious "Pierre le Canadien" was responsible for the train sabotage, he was executed on the spot. As a result, the German military believed they had broken the backbone of the local Resistance movement.

== Aftermath ==
The people of Les Martres-de-Veyre buried the 23-year-old Peter Dmytruk with honours in the community cemetery. Because of the war, it would be more than a year before the Canadian government could confirm Dmytruk's death to his family. Following VE Day, however, he was amongst those individuals almost completely forgotten, as the Canadian people were anxious to put the War behind them.

However, acclaimed as a hero whose selfless courage helped bring freedom to France and whose death saved the life of many residents of Les Martres-de-Veyre, a street was named after him. The Fourth French Republic honoured Dmytruk with the Croix de Guerre and at the end of the War, beginning in 1946 and each year thereafter, the citizens of Les Martres-de-Veyre held a parade and memorial service at his monument.

Almost thirty years after his death, in August 1972, the surprised mayor of Wynyard, Saskatchewan received a letter from the mayor of Les Martres-de-Veyre, who proposed to honour the slain Canadian airman through the twinning of their two small towns and the creation of a new and larger memorial at Dmytruk's gravesite. On the thirtieth anniversary of his death, a 13-person delegation of Dmytruk's relatives and officials from Saskatchewan joined the French commemoration ceremony.

In 1999, Peter Dmytruk was awarded the "Nation Builders Awards" that honours the contributions of outstanding Ukrainian Canadians from the Province of Saskatchewan.
