= Corent =

- Commune
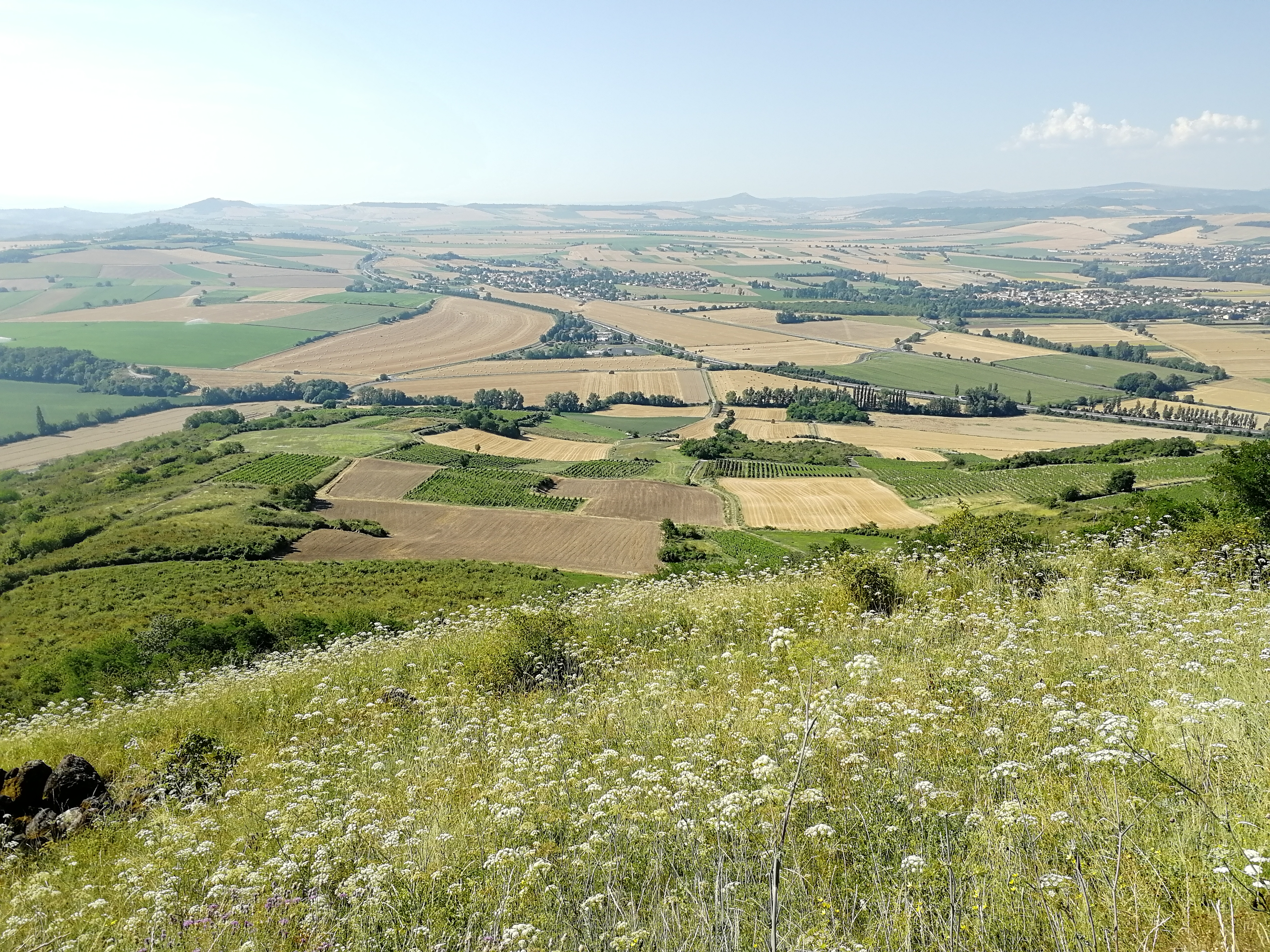
- View from the Corent plateau

- Coat of arms
- Location of Corent
- Location within France Location within Auvergne-Rhône-Alpes
- Coordinates: 45°40′05″N 3°11′43″E
- Country: France
- Region: Auvergne-Rhône-Alpes
- Department: Puy-de-Dôme
- Arrondissement: Clermont-Ferrand
- Canton: Les Martres-de-Veyre

Government
  - Mayor (2026–32): Thierry Julien
- Area^{1}: 2.68 km^{2} (1.03 sq mi)
- Elevation: 500 m (1,600 ft)
- Highest elevation: 610 m (2,000 ft)
- Lowest elevation: 330 m (1,080 ft)
- Population (2023): 799
  - Density: 298/km^{2} (772/sq mi)
- Time zone: UTC+01:00 (CET)
  - Summer (DST): UTC+02:00 (CEST)
- INSEE/Postal code: 63120 /63730
- ^{1} French Land Register data, which excludes lakes, ponds, glaciers > 1 km^{2} (0.386 sq mi or 247 acres) and river estuaries.

Corent (French pronunciation: [kɔʁɑ̃]) is a commune in the Puy-de-Dôme department in Auvergne-Rhône-Alpes in central France.

It sits approximately 2 miles north of Les Martres-de-Veyre on the side of the old volcanic Puy de Corent.

In 2001 excavation began on a Gallic (Celtic) and later Gallo-Roman Oppidum found in a field atop the puy. To this date, vast quantities of land have been excavated revealing the site as a main political, religious and economic center. Corent was an important fortified Celtic oppidum during the pre-Roman La Tène period (Late Iron Age), and there was already a dense fortified/walled settlement on the plateau during the Late Bronze Age Urnfield period.

== Gallic oppidum ==
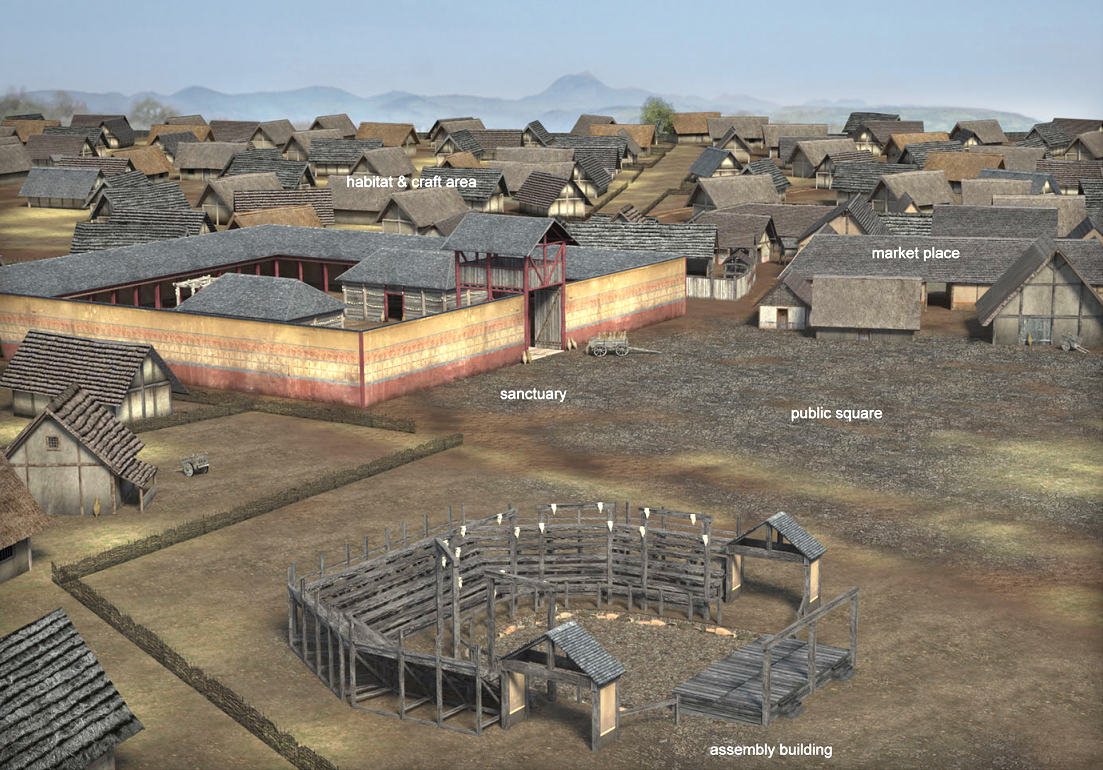
Reconstruction of the Corent oppidum, La Tène period.

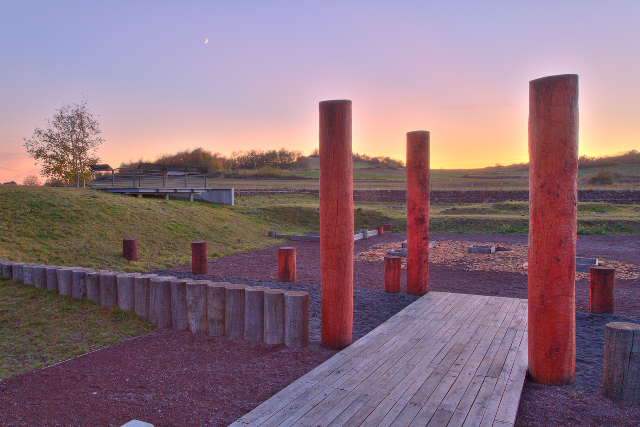
Corent sanctuary. See: Digital reconstruction

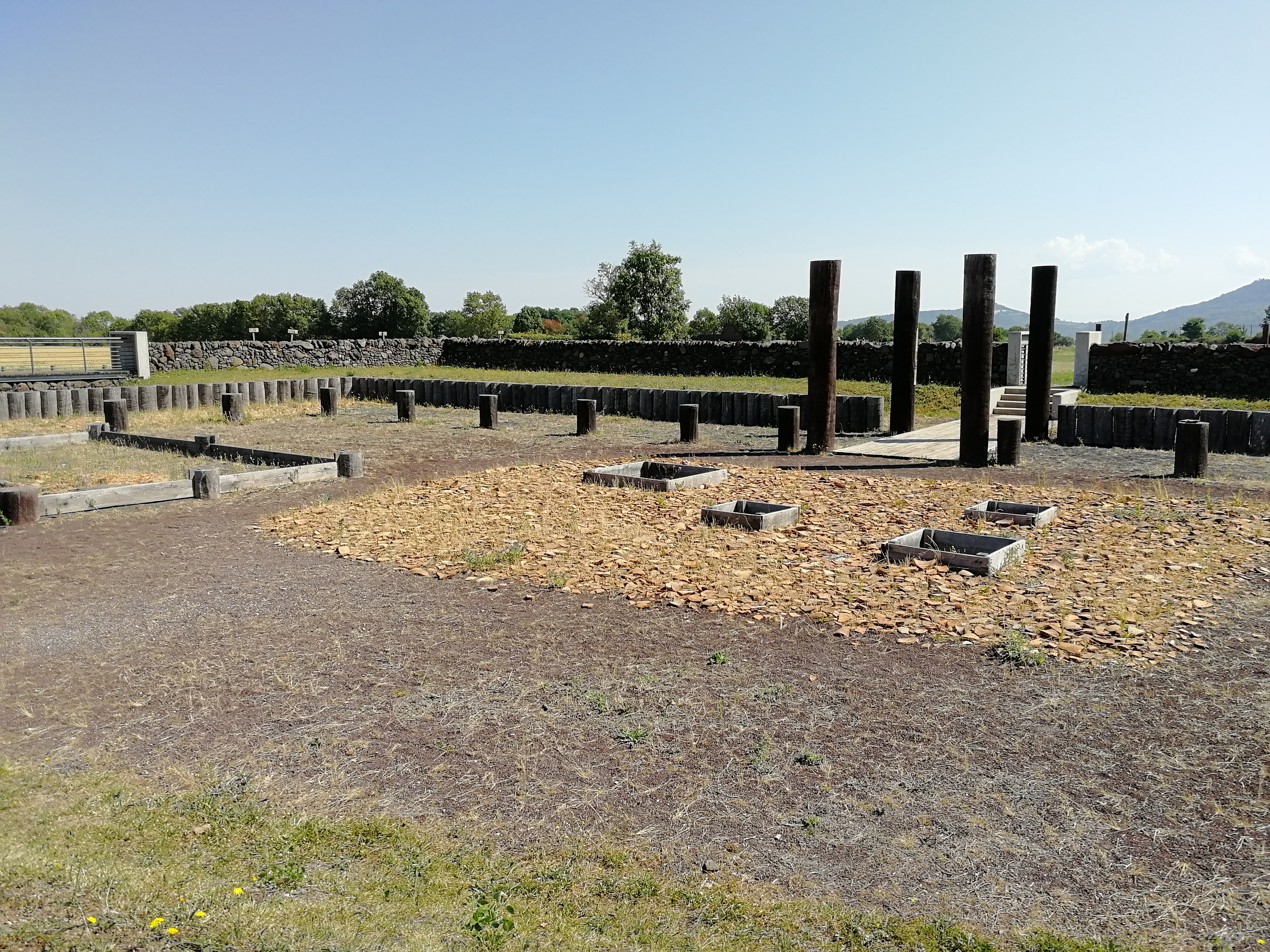
Sanctuary

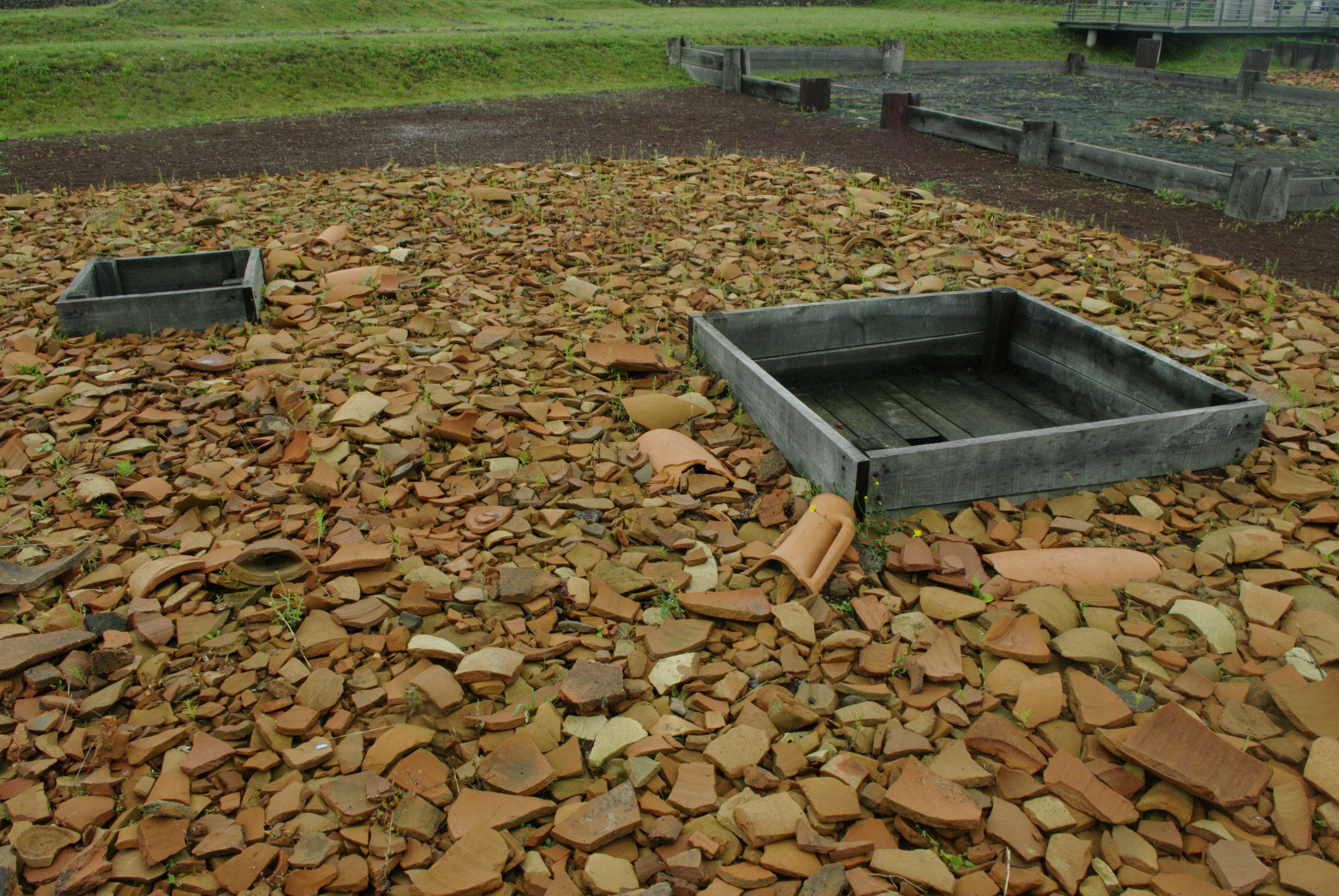
Sanctuary - libation pit

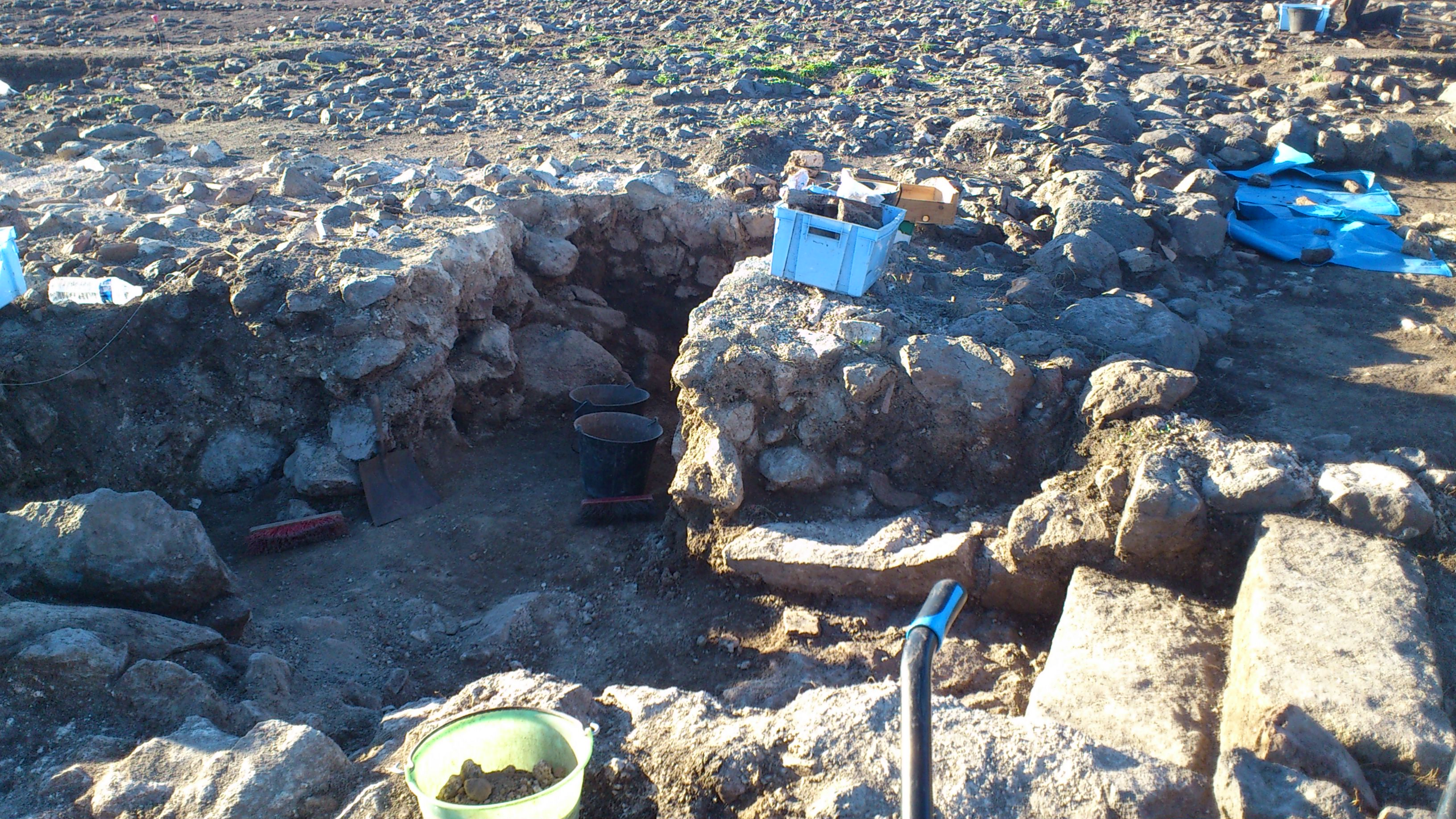
Excavations

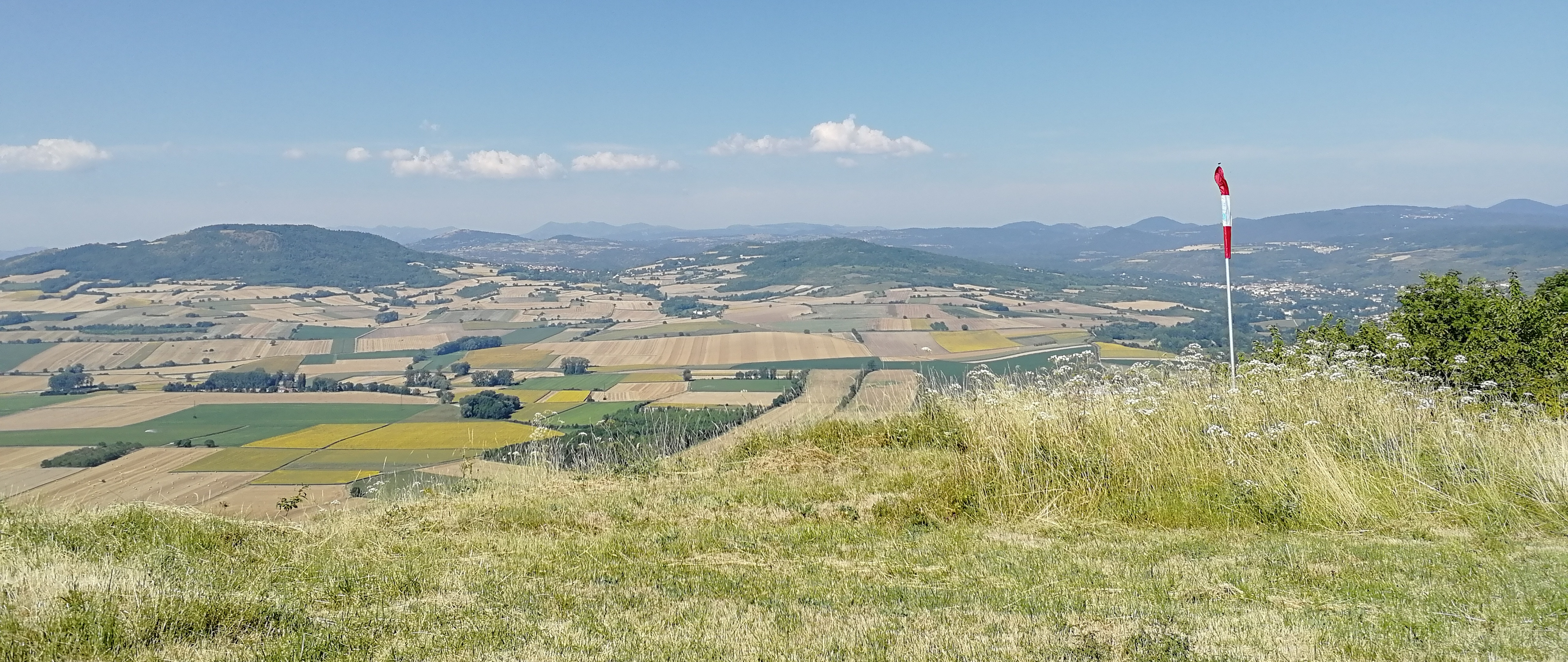
View from the plateau

== See also ==
- Communes of the Puy-de-Dôme department
