= Empfingen =

- Municipality
- Coat of arms

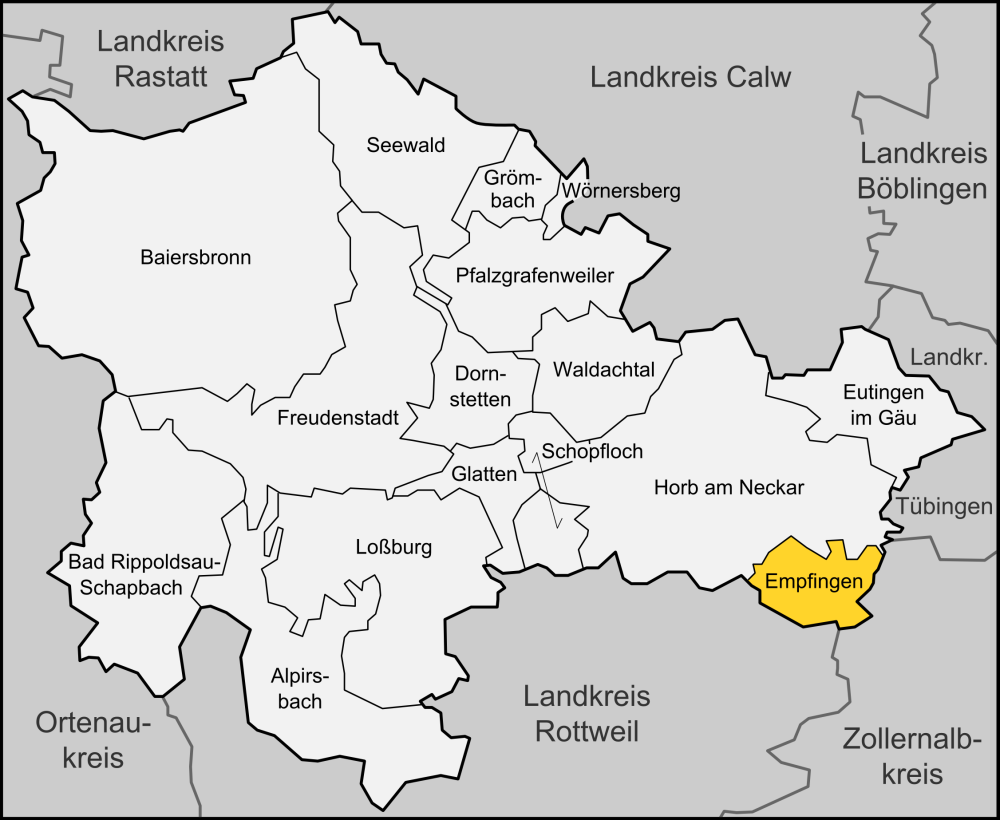
- Location of Empfingen within Freudenstadt district
- Interactive map of Empfingen
- Location within Germany Location within Baden-Württemberg
- Coordinates: 48°23′32″N 8°42′43″E
- Country: Germany
- State: Baden-Württemberg
- Admin. region: Karlsruhe
- District: Freudenstadt

Government
  - Mayor (2017–25): Ferdinand Truffner

Area
  - Total: 18.29 km^{2} (7.06 sq mi)
- Elevation: 496 m (1,627 ft)

Population (2025-12-31)
  - Total: 4,293
  - Density: 234.7/km^{2} (607.9/sq mi)
- Time zone: UTC+01:00 (CET)
  - Summer (DST): UTC+02:00 (CEST)
- Postal codes: 72186
- Dialling codes: 07485
- Vehicle registration: FDS, HCH, HOR, WOL
- Website: www.empfingen.de

Empfingen (German pronunciation: [ˈɛmpfɪŋən]) is a municipality in the district Freudenstadt in Baden-Württemberg in southern Germany.

Empfingen itself comprises two local districts, Wiesenstetten and Dommelsberg. Empfingen is close to the federal motorway 81 Stuttgart – Singen (A 81).

== Twin towns ==
- La Roche-Blanche, France.

== Events ==
- Beatparade
