= Saint-Amant-Tallende =

- Commune
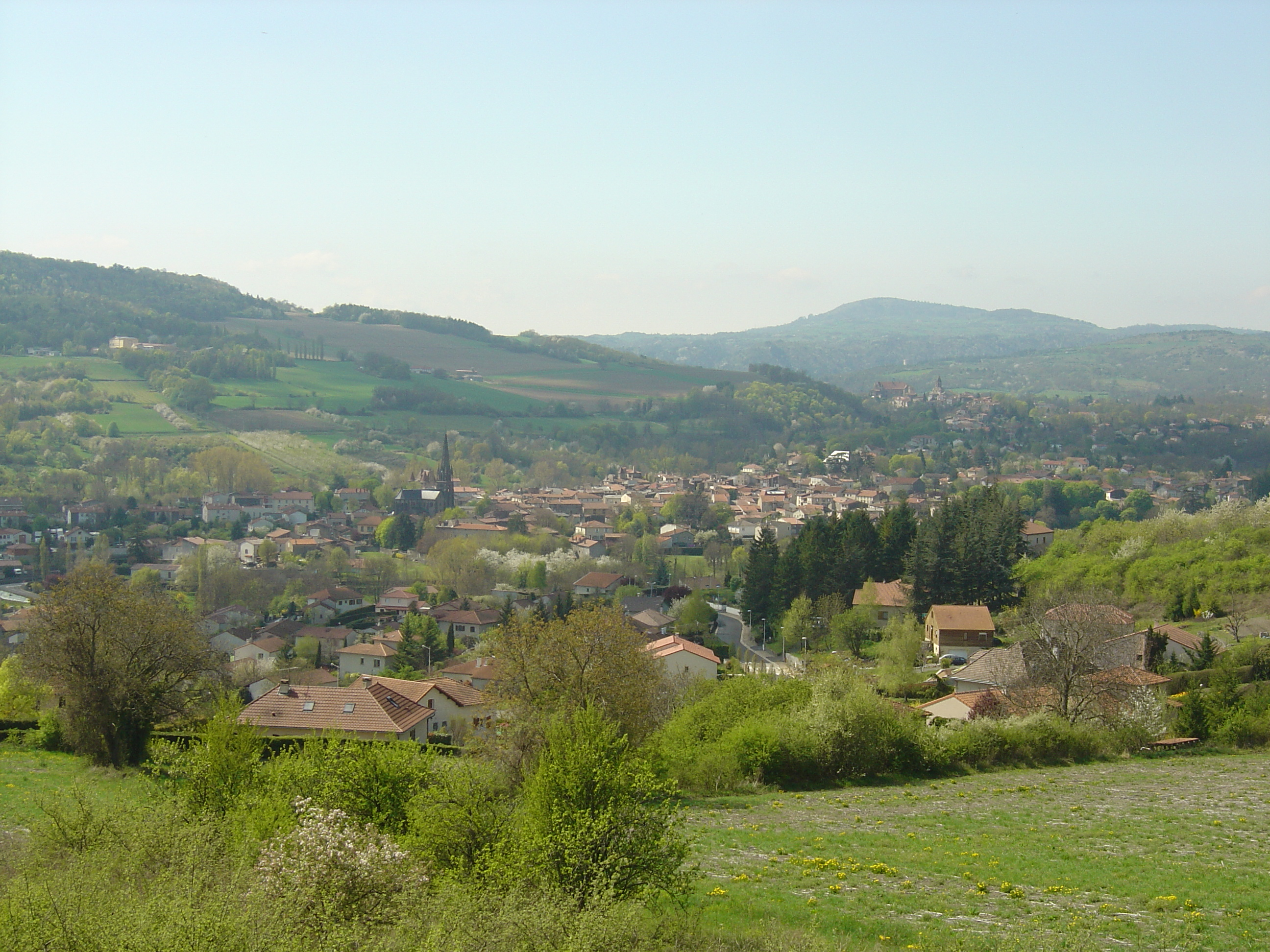
- A general view of Saint-Amant-Tallende

- Coat of arms
- Location of Saint-Amant-Tallende
- Location within France Location within Auvergne-Rhône-Alpes
- Coordinates: 45°40′08″N 3°06′29″E
- Country: France
- Region: Auvergne-Rhône-Alpes
- Department: Puy-de-Dôme
- Arrondissement: Clermont-Ferrand
- Canton: Les Martres-de-Veyre
- Intercommunality: Mond'Arverne Communauté

Government
  - Mayor (2020–2026): Nathalie Guillot
- Area^{1}: 4.97 km^{2} (1.92 sq mi)
- Elevation: 450 m (1,480 ft)
- Highest elevation: 686 m (2,251 ft)
- Lowest elevation: 408 m (1,339 ft)
- Population (2023): 1,866
  - Density: 375/km^{2} (972/sq mi)
- Time zone: UTC+01:00 (CET)
  - Summer (DST): UTC+02:00 (CEST)
- INSEE/Postal code: 63315 /63450
- ^{1} French Land Register data, which excludes lakes, ponds, glaciers > 1 km^{2} (0.386 sq mi or 247 acres) and river estuaries.

Saint-Amant-Tallende (French pronunciation: [sɛ̃.t‿amɑ̃ talɑ̃d]) is a commune in the Puy-de-Dôme department in Auvergne-Rhône-Alpes in central France.

== See also ==
- Communes of the Puy-de-Dôme department
