= Canton of Les Martres-de-Veyre =

Coordinates: 45.69°N 3.19°E

The canton of Les Martres-de-Veyre is an administrative division of the Puy-de-Dôme department, central France. It was created at the French canton reorganisation which came into effect in March 2015. Its seat is in Les Martres-de-Veyre.

It consists of the following communes:

1. Authezat
2. Chanonat
3. Corent
4. Le Crest
5. Les Martres-de-Veyre
6. Orcet
7. La Roche-Blanche
8. Saint-Amant-Tallende
9. La Sauvetat
10. Tallende
11. Veyre-Monton
