= La Sauvetat, Puy-de-Dôme =

La Sauvetat
- Commune
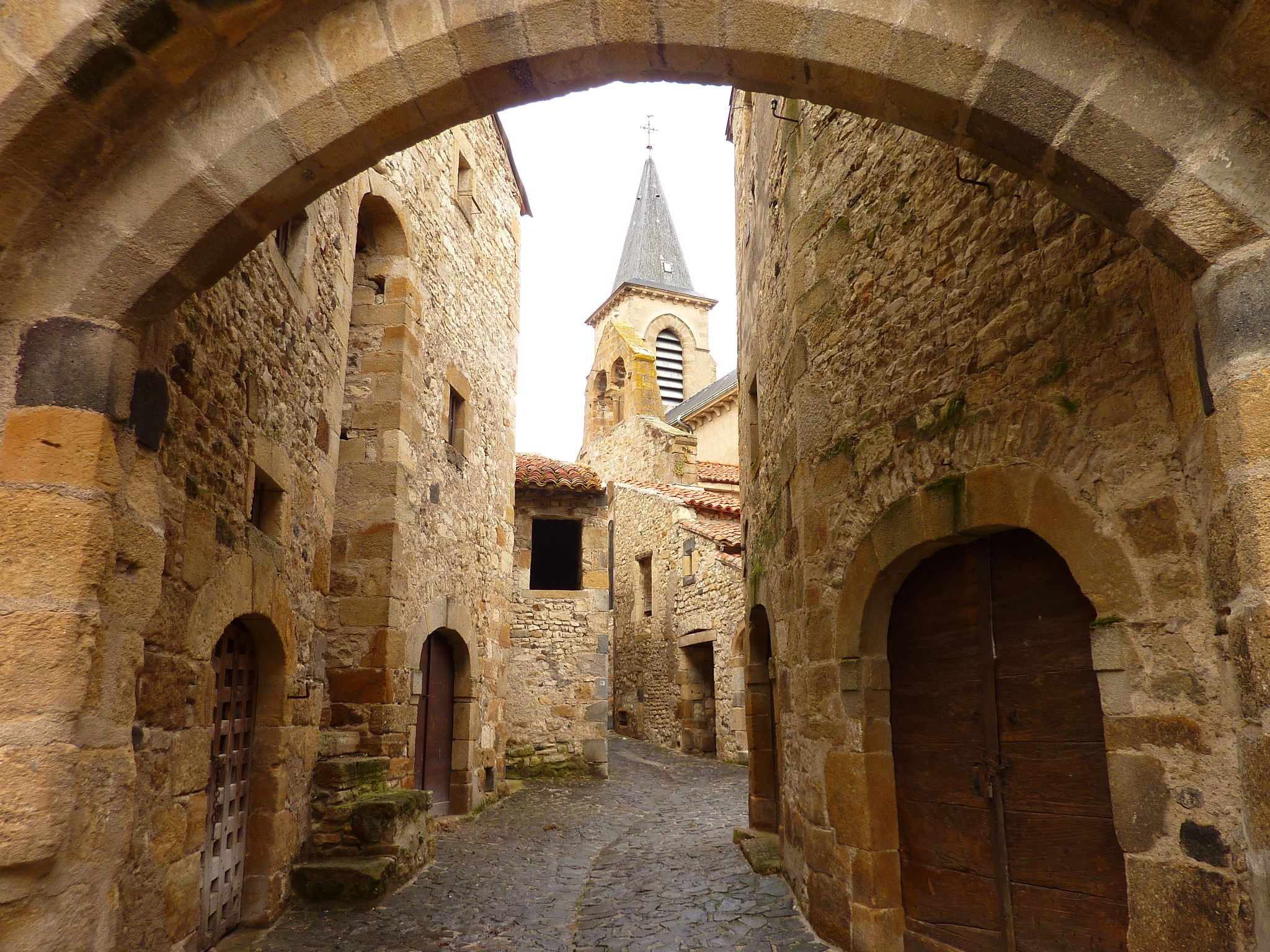
- Fort of La Sauvetat

- Coat of arms
- Location of La Sauvetat
- Location within France Location within Auvergne-Rhône-Alpes
- Coordinates: 45°38′12″N 3°10′16″E
- Country: France
- Region: Auvergne-Rhône-Alpes
- Department: Puy-de-Dôme
- Arrondissement: Clermont-Ferrand
- Canton: Les Martres-de-Veyre
- Intercommunality: Mond'Arverne Communauté

Government
  - Mayor (2026–32): Marie-Josèphe Bonhomme
- Area^{1}: 7.98 km^{2} (3.08 sq mi)
- Elevation: 372 m (1,220 ft)
- Highest elevation: 580 m (1,900 ft)
- Lowest elevation: 356 m (1,168 ft)
- Population (2023): 737
  - Density: 92.4/km^{2} (239/sq mi)
- Time zone: UTC+01:00 (CET)
  - Summer (DST): UTC+02:00 (CEST)
- INSEE/Postal code: 63413 /63730
- ^{1} French Land Register data, which excludes lakes, ponds, glaciers > 1 km^{2} (0.386 sq mi or 247 acres) and river estuaries.

La Sauvetat (French pronunciation: [la sovta]) is a commune in the Puy-de-Dôme department in Auvergne-Rhône-Alpes in central France.

== See also ==
- Communes of the Puy-de-Dôme department
