= La Roche-Blanche, Puy-de-Dôme =

La Roche-Blanche
- Commune
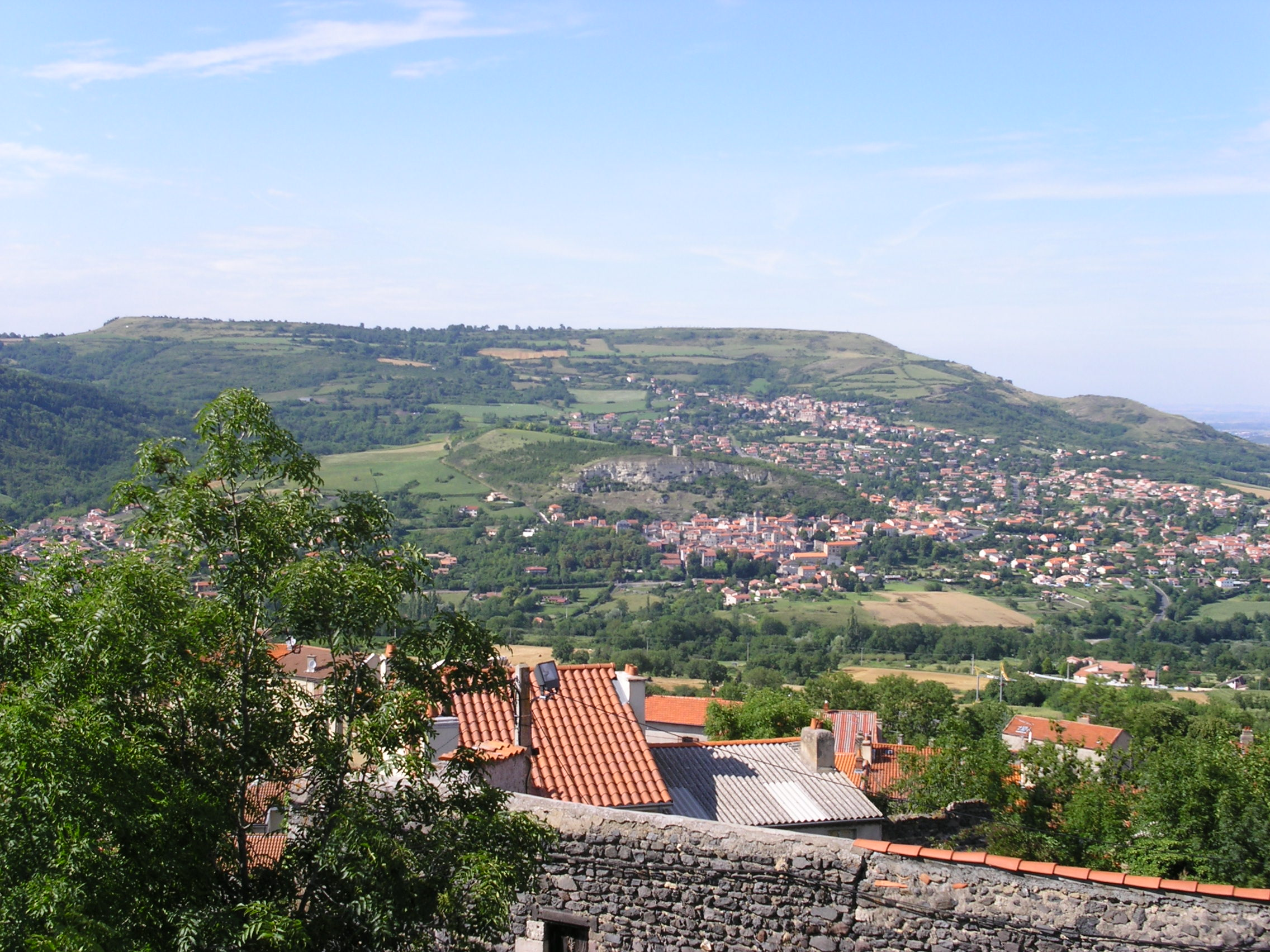
- A general view of La Roche-Blanche

- Coat of arms
- Location of La Roche-Blanche
- Location within France Location within Auvergne-Rhône-Alpes
- Coordinates: 45°42′04″N 3°07′38″E
- Country: France
- Region: Auvergne-Rhône-Alpes
- Department: Puy-de-Dôme
- Arrondissement: Clermont-Ferrand
- Canton: Les Martres-de-Veyre

Government
  - Mayor (2020–2026): Jean-Pierre Roussel
- Area^{1}: 11.6 km^{2} (4.5 sq mi)
- Elevation: 420 m (1,380 ft)
- Highest elevation: 744 m (2,441 ft)
- Lowest elevation: 348 m (1,142 ft)
- Population (2023): 3,311
  - Density: 285/km^{2} (739/sq mi)
- Time zone: UTC+01:00 (CET)
  - Summer (DST): UTC+02:00 (CEST)
- INSEE/Postal code: 63302 /63670
- ^{1} French Land Register data, which excludes lakes, ponds, glaciers > 1 km^{2} (0.386 sq mi or 247 acres) and river estuaries.

La Roche-Blanche (French pronunciation: [la ʁɔʃ blɑ̃ʃ]; Occitan: La Ròcha Blancha) is a commune in the Puy-de-Dôme department in Auvergne in central France.

== Population ==
Historical population
Year	Pop.	±% p.a.
1968	1,403	—
1975	1,903	+4.45%
1982	2,262	+2.50%
1990	2,664	+2.07%
1999	2,917	+1.01%
2007	3,194	+1.14%
2012	3,192	−0.01%
2017	3,422	+1.40%
2023	3,311	−0.55%
Source: INSEE

== Twin towns ==
The commune is twinned with:

- Empfingen, Germany

== See also ==
- Gergovie
- Communes of the Puy-de-Dôme department
