= Orcet =

- Commune
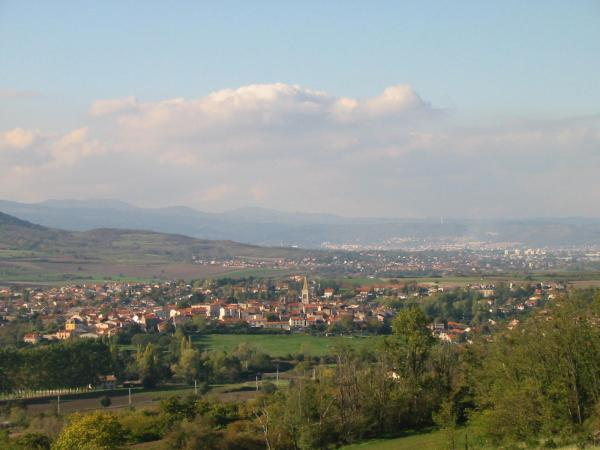
- A general view of Orcet

- Coat of arms
- Location of Orcet
- Location within France Location within Auvergne-Rhône-Alpes
- Coordinates: 45°42′14″N 3°10′08″E
- Country: France
- Region: Auvergne-Rhône-Alpes
- Department: Puy-de-Dôme
- Arrondissement: Clermont-Ferrand
- Canton: Les Martres-de-Veyre
- Intercommunality: Mond'Arverne Communauté

Government
  - Mayor (2026–32): Dominique Guélon
- Area^{1}: 6 km^{2} (2.3 sq mi)
- Elevation: 400 m (1,300 ft)
- Highest elevation: 477 m (1,565 ft)
- Lowest elevation: 349 m (1,145 ft)
- Population (2023): 2,897
  - Density: 480/km^{2} (1,300/sq mi)
- Time zone: UTC+01:00 (CET)
  - Summer (DST): UTC+02:00 (CEST)
- INSEE/Postal code: 63262 /63670
- ^{1} French Land Register data, which excludes lakes, ponds, glaciers > 1 km^{2} (0.386 sq mi or 247 acres) and river estuaries.

Orcet (French pronunciation: [ɔʁsɛ]) is a commune in the Puy-de-Dôme department in Auvergne in central France.

== Population ==
Historical population
Year	Pop.	±% p.a.
1968	790	—
1975	1,349	+7.94%
1982	2,210	+7.31%
1990	2,522	+1.66%
1999	2,681	+0.68%
2007	2,719	+0.18%
2012	2,673	−0.34%
2017	2,669	−0.03%
2023	2,897	+1.38%
Source: INSEE

== See also ==
- Communes of the Puy-de-Dôme department
