= Authezat =

- Commune
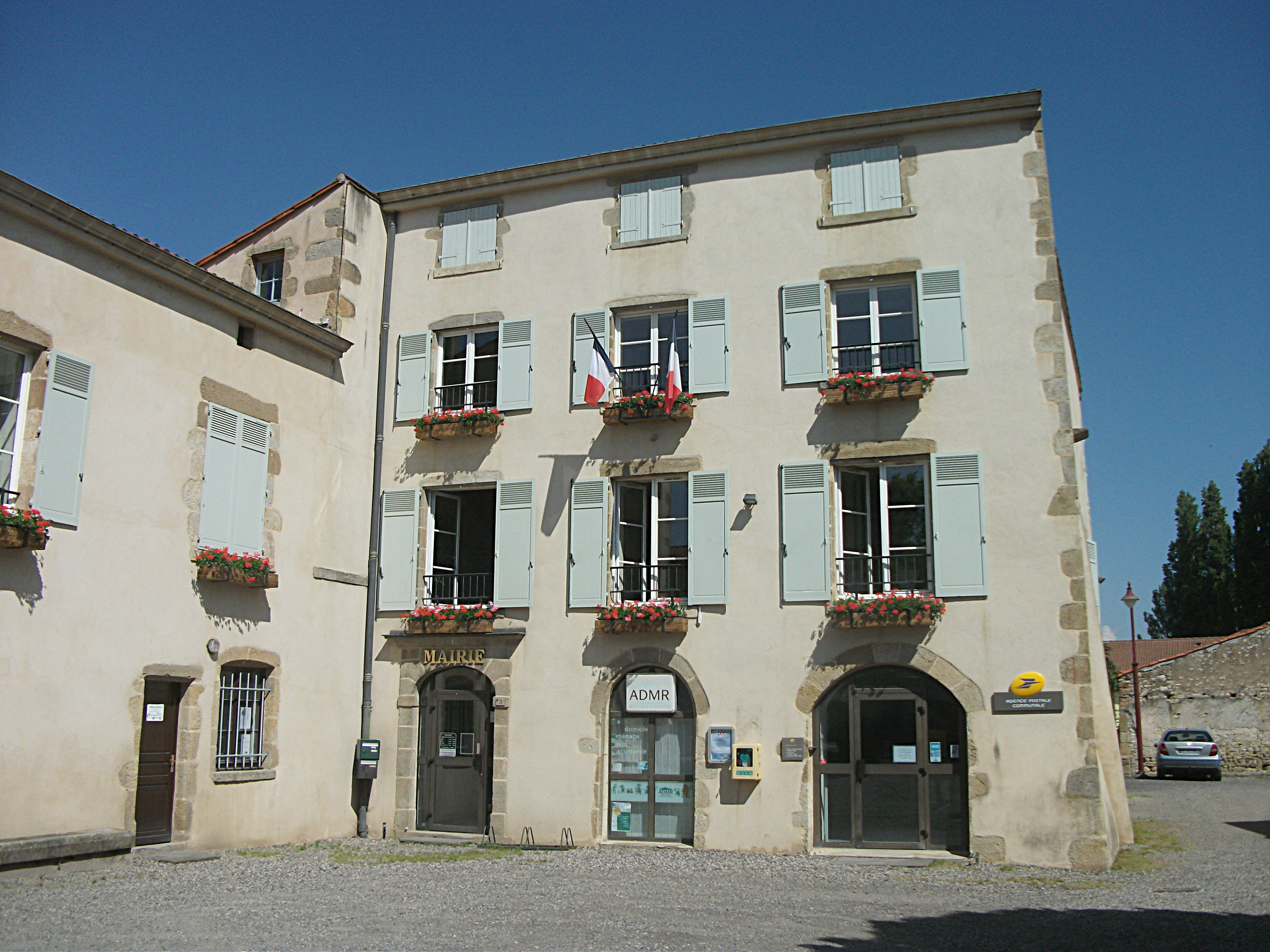
- The town hall in Authezat
- Location of Authezat
- Location within France Location within Auvergne-Rhône-Alpes
- Coordinates: 45°37′56″N 3°11′07″E
- Country: France
- Region: Auvergne-Rhône-Alpes
- Department: Puy-de-Dôme
- Arrondissement: Clermont-Ferrand
- Canton: Les Martres-de-Veyre
- Intercommunality: Mond'Arverne Communauté

Government
  - Mayor (2020–2026): Pierre Metzger
- Area^{1}: 5.79 km^{2} (2.24 sq mi)
- Elevation: 370 m (1,210 ft)
- Highest elevation: 452 m (1,483 ft)
- Lowest elevation: 337 m (1,106 ft)
- Population (2023): 661
  - Density: 114/km^{2} (296/sq mi)
- Time zone: UTC+01:00 (CET)
  - Summer (DST): UTC+02:00 (CEST)
- INSEE/Postal code: 63021 /63114
- ^{1} French Land Register data, which excludes lakes, ponds, glaciers > 1 km^{2} (0.386 sq mi or 247 acres) and river estuaries.

Authezat (French pronunciation: [ot(ə)za]) is a commune in the Puy-de-Dôme department in Auvergne-Rhône-Alpes in central France.

== Population ==
Historical population
Year	Pop.	±% p.a.
1968	316	—
1975	320	+0.18%
1982	366	+1.94%
1990	490	+3.71%
1999	499	+0.20%
2007	628	+2.92%
2012	656	+0.88%
2017	679	+0.69%
2023	661	−0.45%
Source: INSEE

== See also ==
- Communes of the Puy-de-Dôme department
