= John Morgan (missionary) =

Irish minssionary (1812–1865)

- Born: 6 May 1812; Low Hill, Liverpool, England
- Died: 8 June 1865 (aged 53); Māngere, Auckland, New Zealand
- Occupations: Anglican Minister and Missionary
- Spouse: Maria Mathew Coldham (married 26 August 1835)

John Morgan (6 May 1812 – 8 June 1865) was an Anglican missionary and a member of the Church Missionary Society (CMS) mission in New Zealand in the 19th century. He was an important missionary to the Māori who established the Te Awamutu district.

== Biography ==
Morgan was born on 6 May 1812 in Low Hill, Liverpool, the son of John and Patty Morgan. Morgan joined the Church Missionary Society and attended the Church Missionary Society College, Islington, London in 1832. On 21 May 1833, Morgan arrived in the Bay of Islands, New Zealand, in the Prince of Denmark, to join the CMS mission. In December of that year he worked with William Thomas Fairburn, John Alexander Wilson and James Preece to establish the Puriri mission station in the Thames area on the Waihou River. He moved to the Mangapouri mission station in May 1835, which was located near Te Awamutu on the northern bank of the Puniu River, close to where it joins the Waipā River. On 26 August 1835 he married Maria Mathew Coldham, the sister of Marianne Williams. In about 1842 he established the Otawhao mission station.

In 1846 Morgan helped to construct 3 water mills that were built by the local Māori to mill wheat for sale.

In 1849 he attended the St John's College, Auckland and was appointed a deacon on 24 June 1849. On 18 December 1853 he was ordained as a priest. He returned to the Waikato and continued teaching in the schools for Māori people. He also designed St John's Church at his mission station at Otawhao and St Paul's Church at nearby Rangiaowhia. In the early 1860s he acted as a government agent and reported on the Māori King Movement in the Waikato. His activities resulted in his expulsion from Otawhao in April 1863 following the Invasion of the Waikato by colonial government forces. He acted as a chaplain to the military forces from 1863 to 1864. He resigned from the CMS in October 1864 and died at Māngere, on 8 June 1865.
