= Rangiaowhia =

- former Village
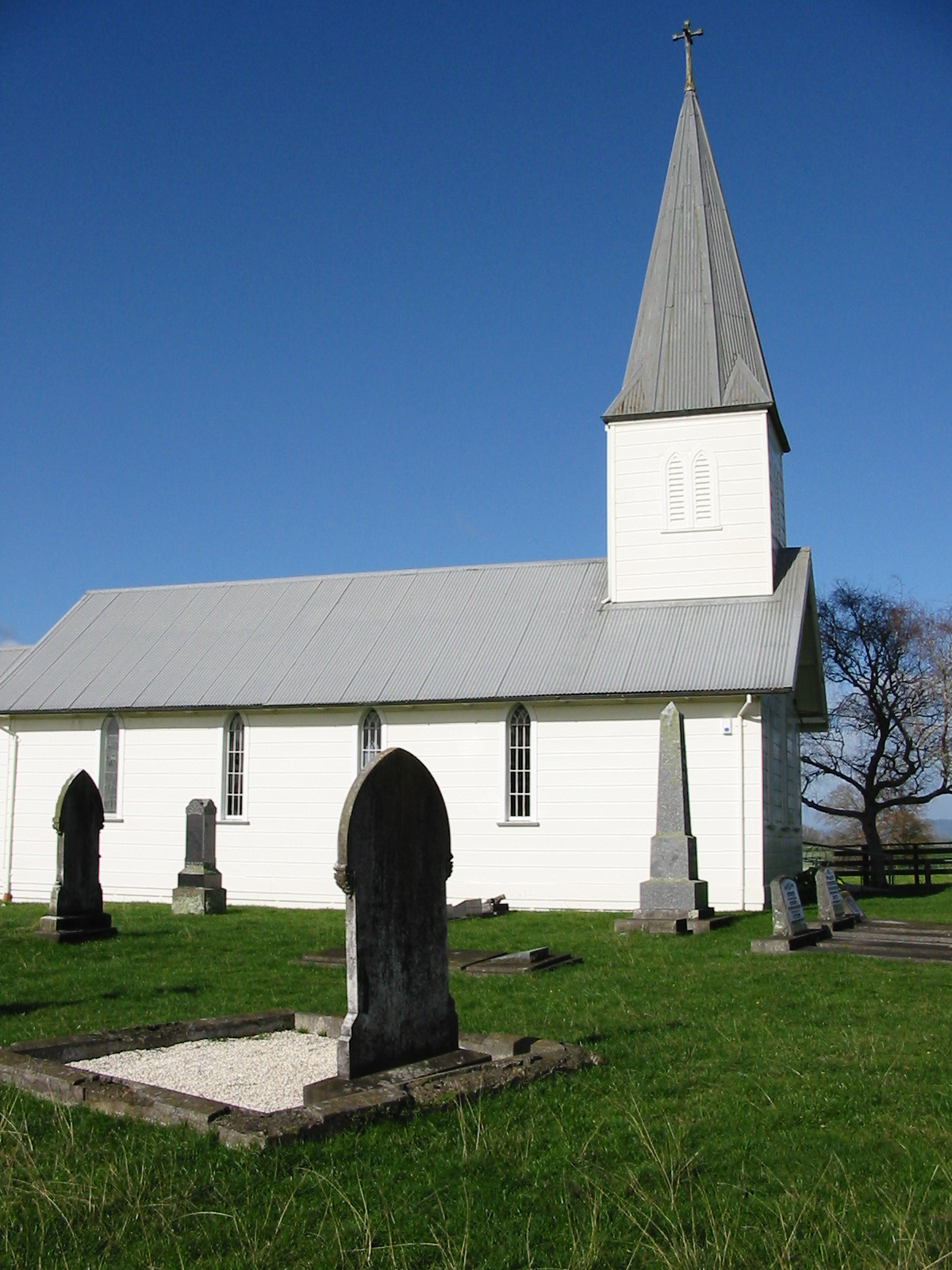
- St Paul's Church (Anglican) at Rangiaowhia
- Interactive map of Rangiaowhia
- Coordinates: 38°00′52″S 175°22′36″E
- Country: New Zealand
- Region: Waikato region
- District: Waipā District
- Ward: Pirongia-Kakepuku General Ward
- Community: Te Awamutu-Kihikihi Community
- Electorates: Taranaki-King Country; Hauraki-Waikato (Māori)

Government
  - Territorial Authority: Waipā District Council
  - Regional council: Waikato Regional Council
  - Taranaki-King Country MP: Barbara Kuriger
  - Hauraki-Waikato MP: Hana-Rawhiti Maipi-Clarke

Area
  - Territorial: 7.14 km^{2} (2.76 sq mi)
- Elevation: 60 m (200 ft)

Population (2023 Census)
  - Territorial: 108
  - Estimate (1852): 700
  - Density: 15.1/km^{2} (39.2/sq mi)
- Time zone: UTC+12 (NZST)
  - Summer (DST): UTC+13 (NZDT)

Rangiaowhia (or Rangiawhia, or Rangiaohia) was, for over 20 years, a thriving village on a ridge between two streams in the Waikato region in New Zealand, about 4 km (2.5 mi) east of Te Awamutu. From 1841 it was the site of a very productive Māori mission station until the Invasion of the Waikato in 1864. The station served Ngāti Hinetu and Ngāti Apakura. Only a church remains from those days, the second oldest Waikato building.

== History ==
In 1851 Rangiaowhia was described as, "About a thousand acres— soon greatly to be added to . . . under cultivation. . . A very numerous population of natives engaged in industry and agriculture. . . in a few years will be the granary of Auckland. . . The whole scene reminds one of English farms. Yellow cornfields bound the horizon; orchards cluster round the houses. The mill, the flail, the plough, the spade, are seldom idle. . . the village bell calls to church or school. cultivating and rendering fruitful the wild wastes of their district,— accumulating guarantees for the continuance of peace, — in all ways setting an example to their countrymen . . . I sincerely trust that many Rangiaowhias,— such remarkable instances of the progress of the Maori race,— may soon be found throughout New Zealand."

In 1852 the village was described as two miles long and with a population of about 700.

An 1857 letter suggests that the area was divided between 14 hapū, who had converted their 'waste' lands to agriculture.

Immediately prior to invasion in 1864, magistrate, John Eldon Gorst, wrote, "The land around Rangiaowhia and Te Awamutu, extending to and including part of Kihikihi, belongs to natives of the great Waikato tribe. . . Besides the great villages of Rangiaowhia, Kihikihi, and Kuakotari, numerous little hamlets are dotted about the country, consisting of three or four native houses surrounded by their patches of cultivated land. Even those parts of the country which appear to be only a barren waste of heavy fern land would be found, on enquiry, to have been once under cultivation, and to be now used as a pasturage for horses, cattle, or pigs . . . Rangiaowhia, for instance, is surrounded by a fence many miles in circuit; roads are made in various directions; bridges have been thrown over impassible swamps; and a good many mill-dams have been constructed. A considerable part of the land was covered, a generation ago, with ancient forest, which the industry of the Waikatos has cleared."

=== Churches ===
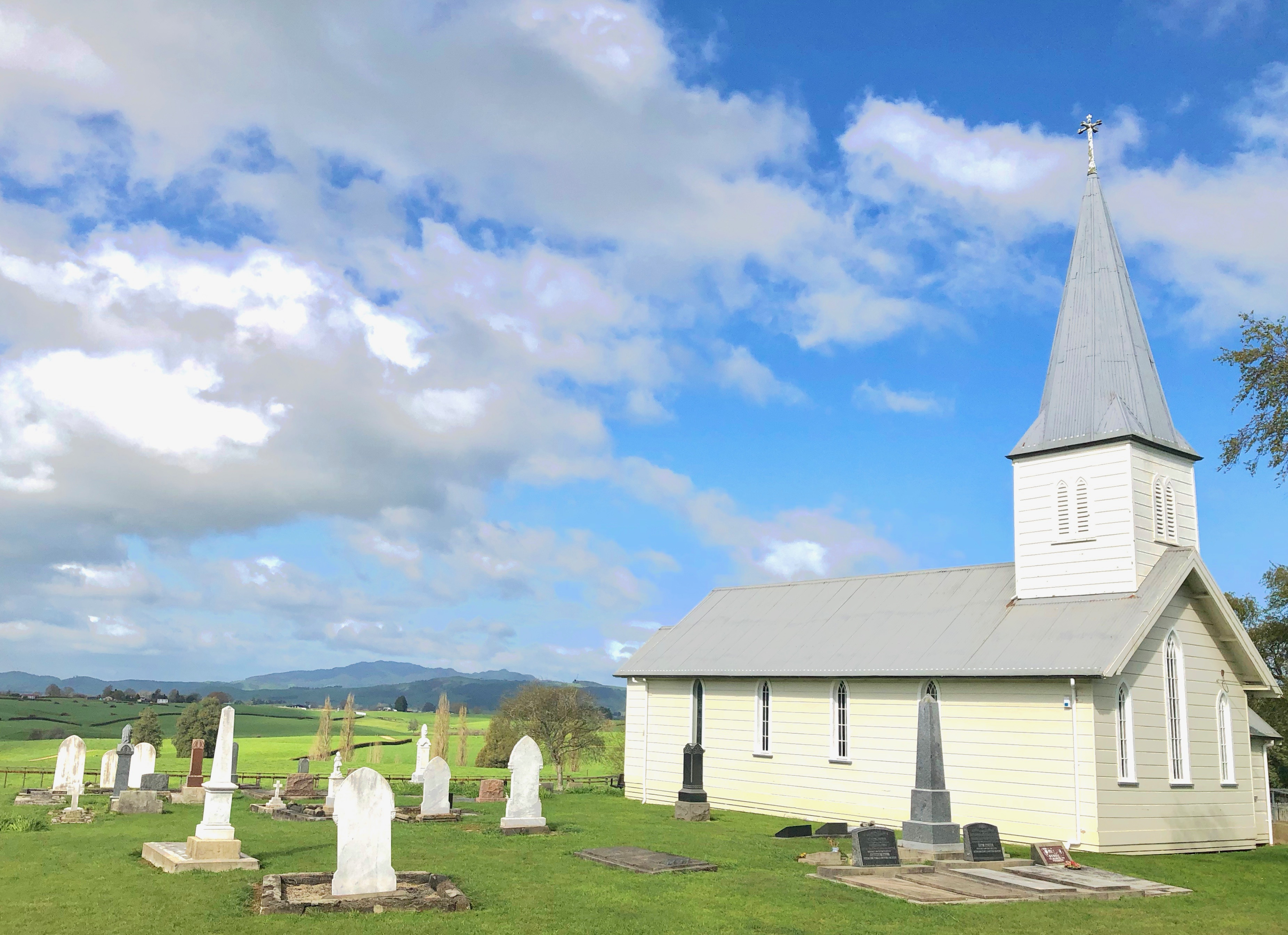
St Paul's church, with Maungatautari in the distance

St Paul's Church was built in Gothic Revival style in 1852–1856 as part of the Church Missionary Society station, replacing a raupo chapel. It and the slightly earlier Old St John's at Te Awamutu are the oldest surviving Waikato buildings. It initially consisted of a bell tower, nave and chancel. The chancel has two stained glass windows, depicting St Paul's encounter with a magician. They were brought from Britain by Bishop Selwyn in 1855 and thought to have been donated by Lady Burdett Coutts. Missionary teacher, Taati Te Waru, added a steeple around 1857. The church sheltered Māori during the Imperial forces attack and was then empty until repaired in the 1870s as a parish church and school. It continues to be used for services.

The Catholic Holy Angels mission station was about 400 metres north of St Paul's. Father Jean Pezant relocated it there from Matamata in 1844. In 1850 he was succeeded by Father Joseph Garavel. Part of the mission station burnt down in an accidental fire in 1865. The church was demolished in 1931. The cemetery remains, with a memorial pou erected in 2015. The bishop's house was across the valley, to the east.

=== School ===
Both Anglican and Catholic missions had schools. Rev. John Morgan ran an Anglican school with over 40 pupils, charging £5 a year for board and tuition in English, singing, industry and religion. In May 1860 Father Garaval had 24 boys in the school when he left due to the war. In 1876 the school had only one girl attending.

=== Crops ===
Shortly after Rev Morgan took over Otawhao (Te Awamutu) mission station in 1841, wheat was grown there and, next year, also at Rangiaowhia. Soon Rangiaowhia wheat fields covered some 450 acres (180 ha). Other crops were barley, oats, potatoes, peach, apple, pear, plum, quince, gooseberry and almond. Cows were also milked and pigs sold in Auckland. A blacksmith maintained the ploughs and other implements.

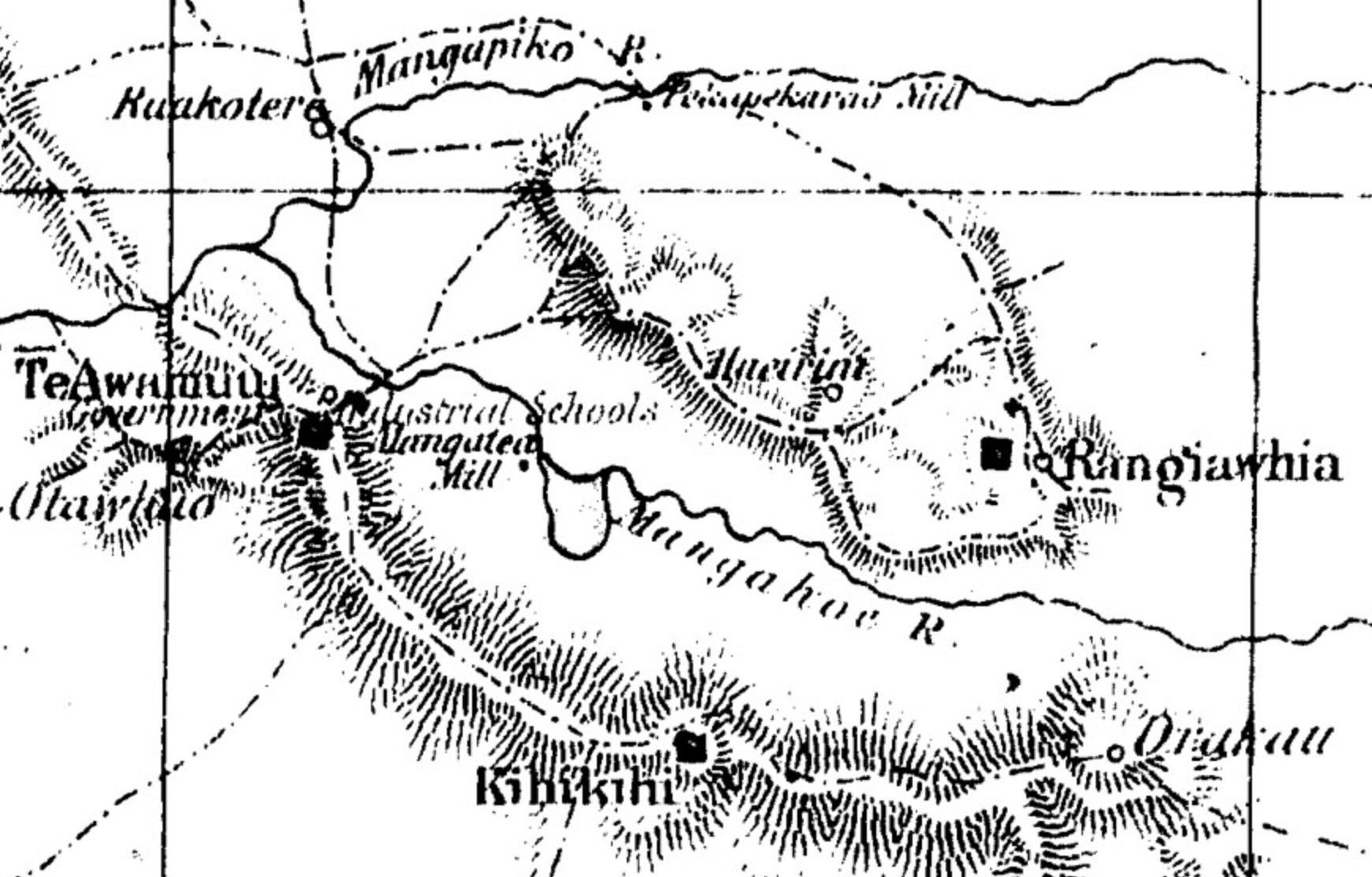
extract of Rangiaowhia area on 1864 military map showing Pekapekarau mill

=== Mills ===
In March 1846 a £200 contract (excluding carriage of timber and building the dam and leat) with Stewart McMullen to erect a mill was started. The mill started grinding in 1847. Its 2 ft 10 in (0.86 m) scoria millstone came from Mt Eden. By 1848 Rangiaowhia flour was sold in Auckland for about £70 and, in later years, reached about £330. The 1846 mill was at Pekapekarau (or Perepekerau on another 1865 map), in the valley to the west, between Hairini and Rangiaowhia. A replacement mill was built between 1851 and 1855 for £400 on Te Rua-o-Tawhiwhi stream, to the east of Rangiaowhia. Both streams feed the Mangapiko Stream, one of the Waipā's tributaries. There were also mills at most of the surrounding settlements.

Governor Grey visited the mill in 1849 and was presented with 2 bags of flour for Queen Victoria. He also spent half a day at Rangiaowhia in 1857, In the gold rushes of 1849–52, Rangiaowhia flour was often shipped to San Francisco and Melbourne.

=== Invasion ===
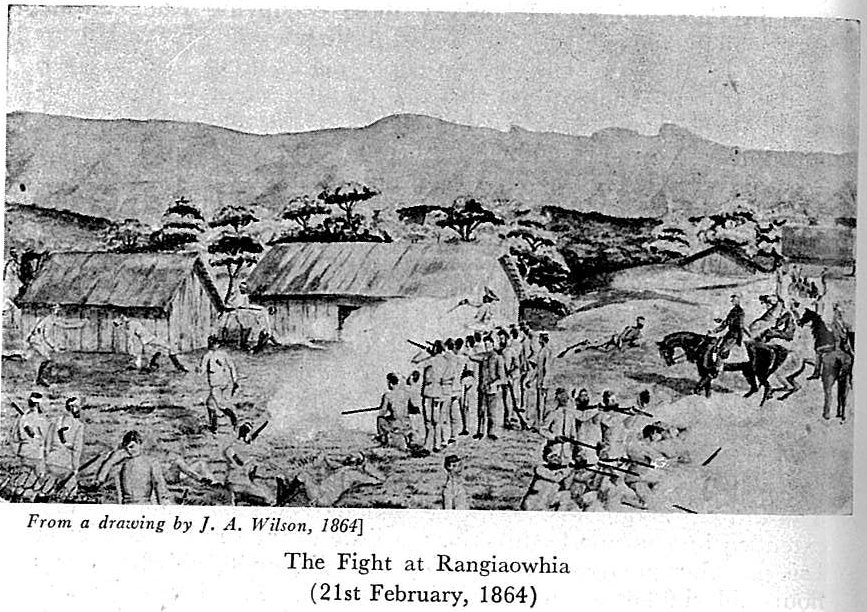

Pōtatau was installed as King at Rangiaowhia in 1858, after which it became a target for government control. To guard against this the roads to Rangiaowhia were defended by a new chain of defensive pā at Paterangi, and at Rangiatea (near Te Rahu, north of Te Awamutu). However, General Cameron, in his Invasion of the Waikato, avoided them by taking 1,230 troops overnight from Te Rore via Waiari, leaving a large masking force in front of Paterangi and arriving in Te Awamutu at dawn.

Bishop George Selwyn, the head of the Anglican Church in New Zealand, who had been "controversially accompanying the Crown forces as official army chaplain", was told nine days before the February attack that women, children and elderly would be taking refuge at unfortified and undefended Rangiaowhia, and had been asked to "consult with Cameron and ensure that the people there would not be harmed". Kingitanga leaders understood they would be unharmed. There were about 200 Ngāti Apakura and Ngāti Hinetu people at Rangiaowhia, supplying food to the garrisons at the pā.

At dawn on 21 February 1864, armed cavalry, followed by foot troops attacked Rangiaowhia. Most terrified villagers fled, a few shot at the troops, some sheltered in the churches, at least seven were burnt to death in their houses and at least one attempted to surrender, but was murdered by troops ignoring their orders. Women were raped and killed in front of children. About a dozen houses were burned down. Official British records state 12 Māori were killed, including two chiefs, and over 30 taken prisoner. Their own losses totaled five, including several officers. Some unofficial estimates suggest there were more than 100 Māori deaths. As the village was largely occupied by women, children and older men, the deaths have been regarded as murder, rather than an act of war.

Later that day, the men of Rangiaowhia abandoned Paterangi, Pikopiko, and Rangiatea pā to defend their families, digging a rifle-trench with a narrow opening to block the road from Te Awamutu on the crest of the ridge at Hairini. Next morning, the 22nd, the cavalry advanced on Hairini, backed by artillery and foot soldiers. Three British and about 20 Māori died, though those numbers are also disputed. The troops then looted the village, though it has been suggested that the Hairini defence was a diversionary tactic, to allow more time to move more goods and animals south to safety. However, enough was left for looting to continue for at least a month after the invasion.

The role of Bishop Selwyn in the Rangiaowhia attack is unclear. He came with the invading forces, but also helped with Māori burials. The wife and two daughters of Kereopa Te Rau were killed in the attack, and his sister was killed in defence of the Hairini line a few days later. Colonel Marmaduke Nixon, who had led the Rangiaowhia cavalry charge, was mortally wounded. His remains are buried at the Nixon memorial in Ōtāhuhu, Auckland. There were no memorials to the victims of Rangiaowhia until the 150th anniversary was commemorated in 2014 with the unveiling of a plaque.

In 2021 a documentary about the Rangiaowhia attack called NZ Wars: Stories of Tainui was released by Great Southern Television and Aotearoa Media Collective for RNZ. It is presented by Mihingarangi Forbes, and contains interviews with historian Vincent O’Malley, and iwi historians Rahui Papa, Brad Totorewa, Tom Roa, Mamae Takerei and Kawhia Muraahi.

=== Redoubt ===
A 200-man redoubt was built later in February, in what is now the Hall domain, formerly a school. In the 1870s a blockhouse was added, manned by the Armed Constabulary.

== Post 1864 ==
Within a month of the invasion, the William Fox government issued a proclamation that rebels who surrendered would get some of their land back, but those who didn't would have their land confiscated. By 1868 there was concern at the resentment the takeover by military settlers was causing. The church was restored in 1875. Rangiaowhia riding was formed as one of 5 ridings in Waipa county in 1876, with Puniu River as its southern boundary. A state school near the hall ran from 1874 to 1939, when several schools were amalgamated into an expanded Te Awamutu school. The school house of about 1900 remains, as does the hall, built on the domain in 1907.

=== Land return ===
As a matter of restorative justice and partnership, in 2022, the Anglican church purchased a 4.7 hectares property at 61 Rangiaowhia Road, adjacent to St Paul’s church, to return to Ngāti Apakura. In September 2023, members of the Anglican Church Te Haahi Mihingare and Ngāti Apakura met in St Paul's church and acknowledged their original association in the mid-nineteenth century, as well as the inability of Bishop Selwyn to protect Ngāti Apakura non-combatants in the 1864 attack. The title deed for the land was then transferred to the Ngāti Apakura Runanga Trust, supporting a long held vision of the hapū to develop again, in their own capacity, on their Rangiaowhia ancestral lands, 160 years later. In March 2024, the property was valued at $1,950,000.

== Demographics ==
Rangiaowhia covers 7.14 km^{2} (2.76 sq mi). The locality is part of the larger Rotoorangi statistical area.

Historical population
| Year | Pop. | ±% p.a. |
|---|---|---|
| 2001 | 93 | — |
| 2006 | 90 | −0.65% |
| 2013 | 99 | +1.37% |
| 2018 | 123 | +4.44% |
| 2023 | 108 | −2.57% |

Rangiaowhia had a population of 108 in the 2023 New Zealand census, a decrease of 15 people (−12.2%) since the 2018 census, and an increase of 9 people (9.1%) since the 2013 census. There were 54 males and 54 females in 42 dwellings. The median age was 43.5 years (compared with 38.1 years nationally). There were 18 people (16.7%) aged under 15 years, 15 (13.9%) aged 15 to 29, 48 (44.4%) aged 30 to 64, and 30 (27.8%) aged 65 or older.

People could identify as more than one ethnicity. The results were 94.4% European (Pākehā), 16.7% Māori, 2.8% Pasifika, and 2.8% Asian. English was spoken by 100.0%, and other languages by 2.8%. The percentage of people born overseas was 19.4, compared with 28.8% nationally.

Religious affiliations were 27.8% Christian, and 2.8% Buddhist. People who answered that they had no religion were 63.9%, and 5.6% of people did not answer the census question.

Of those at least 15 years old, 12 (13.3%) people had a bachelor's or higher degree, 51 (56.7%) had a post-high school certificate or diploma, and 27 (30.0%) people exclusively held high school qualifications. The median income was $37,000, compared with $41,500 nationally. 15 people (16.7%) earned over $100,000 compared to 12.1% nationally. The employment status of those at least 15 was 48 (53.3%) full-time and 15 (16.7%) part-time.

=== Prominent people ===
Lloyd Mandeno (1888–1973), engineer and inventor
