= Te Awamutu =

Town in Waikato, New Zealand

- Town
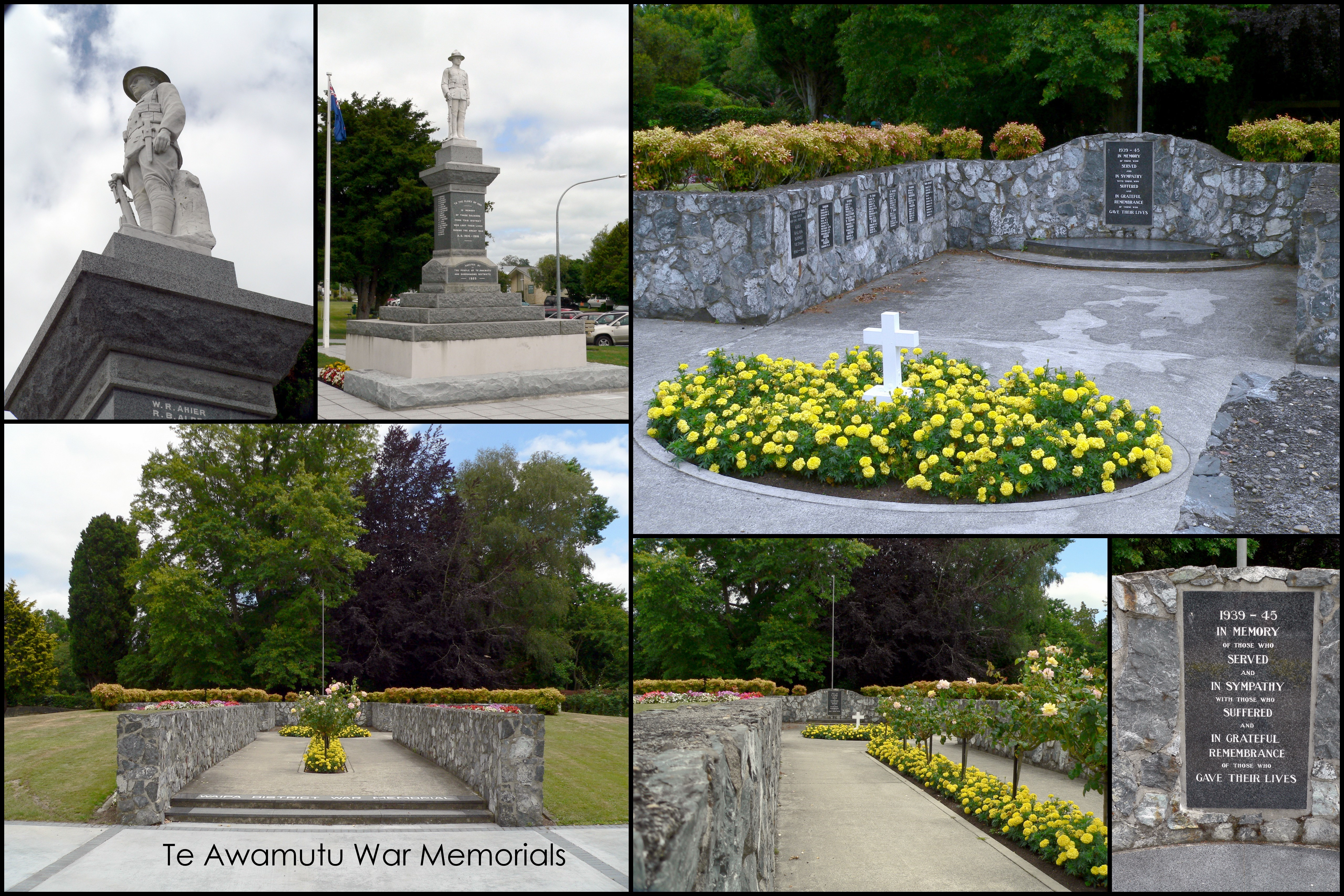
- Te Awamutu war memorials
- Nicknames: T.A., "The Rose Town of New Zealand"
- Interactive map of Te Awamutu
- Coordinates: 38°01′S 175°19′E
- Country: New Zealand
- Region: Waikato
- District: Waipā District
- Ward: Te Awamutu-Kihikihi General Ward
- Community: Te Awamutu-Kihikihi Community
- Electorates: Taranaki-King Country; Hauraki-Waikato (Māori)

Government
  - Territorial Authority: Waipā District Council
  - Regional council: Waikato Regional Council
  - Mayor of Waipa: Mike Pettit
  - Taranaki-King Country MP: Barbara Kuriger
  - Hauraki-Waikato MP: Hana-Rawhiti Maipi-Clarke

Area
  - Total: 14.18 km^{2} (5.47 sq mi)

Population (June 2025)
  - Total: 13,950
  - Density: 983.8/km^{2} (2,548/sq mi)
- Time zone: UTC+12 (NZST)
  - Summer (DST): UTC+13 (NZDT)
- Website: City: teawamutu.co.nz Region: http://www.ew.govt.nz

Te Awamutu is a town in the Waikato region in the North Island of New Zealand. It is the council seat of the Waipā District and serves as a service town for the farming communities which surround it. Te Awamutu is located some 30 kilometres (19 mi) south of Hamilton on State Highway 3, one of the two main routes south from Auckland and Hamilton.

Te Awamutu has a population of 13,950 (June 2025), making it the fifth-largest urban area in the Waikato behind Hamilton, Taupō, Cambridge and Tokoroa.

The town is often referred to as "The Rose Town of New Zealand" because of its elaborate rose gardens in the centre of the town. Many local businesses use "Rosetown" in their name, and the symbol of the rose is widely used on local signs and billboards. The local paper, Te Awamutu Courier, had a symbol of a rose in the masthead on its front page.

== History and culture ==
Tainui Māori first settled in the area in about 1450, according to noted Tainui historian Te Hurinui-Jones. Te Awamutu means "the river cut short", as it marked the end of the navigable section of the Mangapiko Stream.

Te Awamutu was the birthplace of the first Māori King, Pōtatau Te Wherowhero (died 1860).

The first European missionaries visited the area in 1834. A missionary settlement was set up by Benjamin Yate Ashwell of the Church Missionary Society (CMS). and Māori Christians in July 1839 after they observed Tainui warriors, who had been fighting at Rotorua, return with 60 backpacks of human remains and proceed to cook and eat them in the Otawhao Pā. In 1842 the Rev. John Morgan moved to the Otawhao Mission Station. Otawhao was to the south west of Te Awamutu, on the rise overlooking what is now Centennial Park.

The CMS missionaries established a flourishing trade school that focused on developing agricultural skills. The missionaries introduced European crops such as wheat, potatoes and peaches. In 1846 Morgan provided advice and some capital to help local Māori to construct eight water mills to grind wheat into flour. Morgan assisted in finding a suitable miller to operate the mills and to train Māori in this skill.

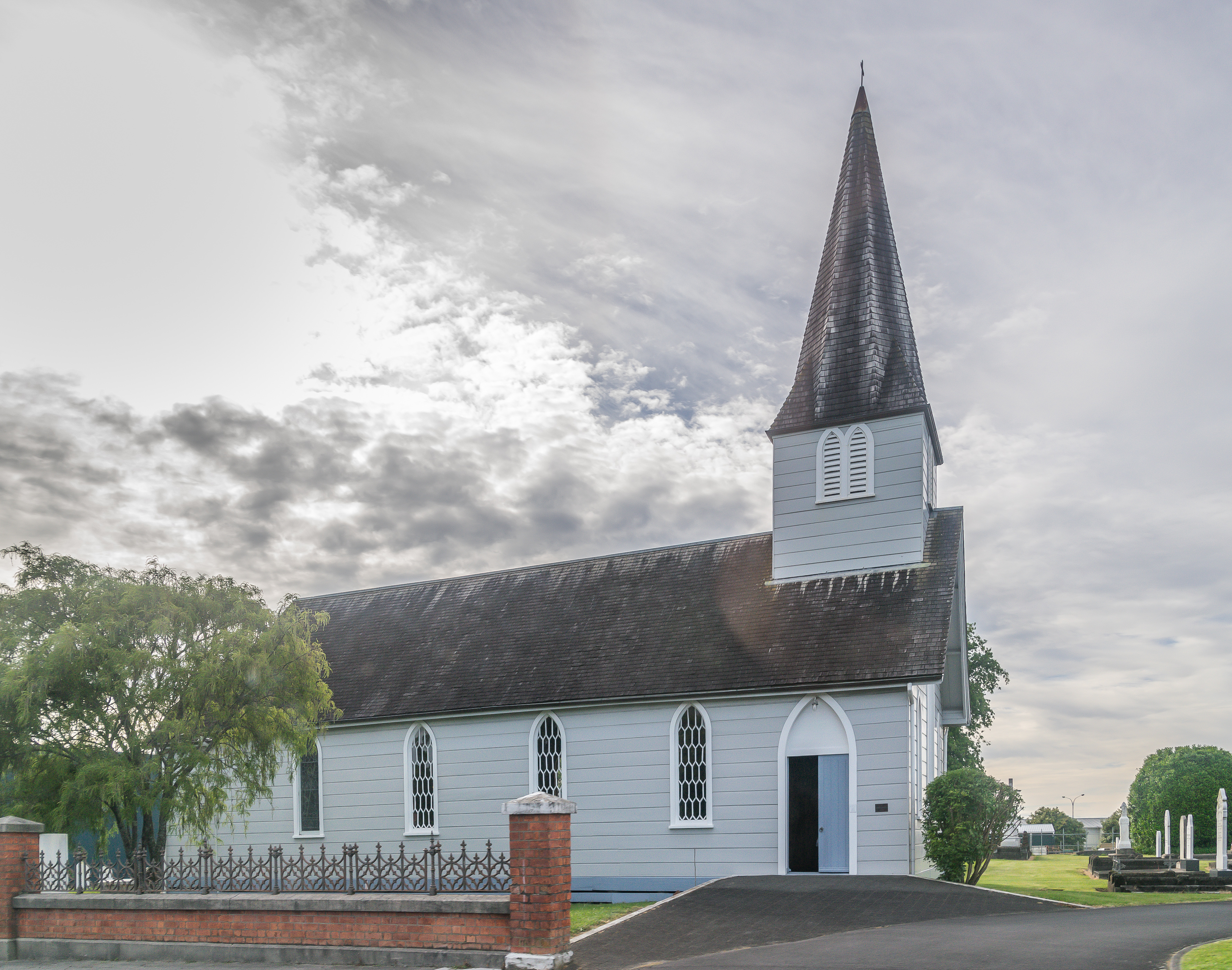
St John's church built 1853

Possibly the oldest surviving building in the Waikato is Old St John's Church, built in 1853 as part of the mission station. It is in Gothic Revival style. During the 1850s the wider area prospered on the back of sending surplus farm produce to Auckland. For a brief period wheat was even sent overseas. By the late 1850s prices dropped as cheaper flour and other foodstuffs were imported from Australia. This caused huge resentment among local Māori who had grown use to the wealth provided by trade. Some of the more warlike Māori such as Rewi Maniapoto blamed the missionaries for having a negative influence on Māori tikanga (cultural practices). He attempted to kill the local missionary and burnt down the trade school and other mission buildings. Some Christian Māori warned Europeans to leave the Waikato as their lives were in danger. Te Awamutu was a major site during the New Zealand Wars of the 19th century, serving as a garrison town for the colonial settlers from 1864. European settlement began at the conclusion of the Waikato Wars (1863–1865).

=== Marae ===
The local Mangatoatoa Marae and Te Maru o Ihowa meeting house is a meeting place for the Ngāti Maniapoto hapū of Ngutu, Pare te Kawa and Parewaeono, and the Waikato Tainui hapū of Ngāti Ngutu and Ngāti Paretekawa.

=== Local government ===
Rangiaowhia, or Rangiaohia Highway Board administered the roads in the town until Te Awamutu Town Board's election on 1 November 1884. The board first met on 8 November, though there had been an earlier attempt to form a board and there was an unsuccessful challenge to the legality of the election. Te Awamutu Borough Council took over from the board and first met on 10 May 1915. It was merged into Waipā District Council on 23 October 1989.

== Geography ==
Te Awamutu literally means in English "The River's End". The town is on gently undulating land close to the banks of a tributary of the Waipā River. The Waikato Plains lie to the north and east, and the promontory of Mount Pirongia, 20 kilometres to the west, is easily visible. Inside the township are two streams called the Mangapiko Stream and the Mangaohoi Stream. The Mangaohoi ends and becomes the Tributary of the Mangapiko near Memorial park.

The town is close to the extinct Kakepuku and Pirongia volcanoes (and other volcanoes of the Alexandra Volcanic Group). Maungatautari, another extinct volcanic cone, now the site of New Zealand's largest ecological restoration project, is also nearby.

Other towns surrounding Te Awamutu include Cambridge, 25 kilometres to the northeast, Ōtorohanga, 30 kilometres to the southwest, and Raglan 50 kilometres to the northwest. The small town of Kihikihi lies just to the south of Te Awamutu.

The main thoroughfare is Alexandra Street, so named because it was once the main road to the town of Alexandra (since renamed to Pirongia to avoid confusion with the town of Alexandra in the South Island).

== Demographics ==
Te Awamutu covers 14.18 km^{2} (5.47 sq mi) and had an estimated population of 13,950 as of June 2025, with a population density of 984 people per km^{2}.

Historical population
Year	Pop.	±% p.a.
2006	10,146	—
2013	10,854	+0.97%
2018	12,543	+2.93%
2023	13,380	+1.30%

Te Awamutu had a population of 13,380 in the 2023 New Zealand census, an increase of 837 people (6.7%) since the 2018 census, and an increase of 2,526 people (23.3%) since the 2013 census. There were 6,429 males, 6,903 females, and 45 people of other genders in 5,136 dwellings. 2.7% of people identified as LGBTIQ+. The median age was 40.2 years (compared with 38.1 years nationally). There were 2,532 people (18.9%) aged under 15 years, 2,355 (17.6%) aged 15 to 29, 5,580 (41.7%) aged 30 to 64, and 2,910 (21.7%) aged 65 or older.

People could identify as more than one ethnicity. The results were 80.4% European (Pākehā); 24.1% Māori; 3.2% Pasifika; 6.9% Asian; 0.6% Middle Eastern, Latin American and African New Zealanders (MELAA); and 2.0% other, which includes people giving their ethnicity as "New Zealander". English was spoken by 96.7%, Māori by 5.5%, Samoan by 0.4%, and other languages by 7.4%. No language could be spoken by 2.5% (e.g. too young to talk). New Zealand Sign Language was known by 0.5%. The percentage of people born overseas was 16.9, compared with 28.8% nationally.

Religious affiliations were 33.2% Christian, 1.1% Hindu, 0.4% Islam, 1.2% Māori religious beliefs, 0.7% Buddhist, 0.4% New Age, 0.1% Jewish, and 1.6% other religions. People who answered that they had no religion were 52.9%, and 8.4% of people did not answer the census question.

Of those at least 15 years old, 1,833 (16.9%) people had a bachelor's or higher degree, 5,883 (54.2%) had a post-high school certificate or diploma, and 3,129 (28.8%) people exclusively held high school qualifications. The median income was $40,600, compared with $41,500 nationally. 924 people (8.5%) earned over $100,000 compared to 12.1% nationally. The employment status of those at least 15 was 5,469 (50.4%) full-time, 1,257 (11.6%) part-time, and 264 (2.4%) unemployed.

Individual statistical areas
Name	Area (km^{2})	Population	Density (per km^{2})	Dwellings	Median age	Median income
Te Awamutu North	2.82	1,185	420	447	41.8 years	$42,000
Te Awamutu West	1.18	1,482	1,256	534	37.4 years	$44,600
Goodfellow Park	0.95	1,788	1,882	747	38.3 years	$36,000
Te Awamutu Stadium	1.17	1,815	1,551	693	42.5 years	$42,700
Te Awamutu Central	0.71	384	541	180	47.0 years	$34,800
Pekerau	4.01	3,084	769	1,134	39.0 years	$41,900
Fraser Street	1.14	1,506	1,321	579	44.4 years	$41,100
Sherwin Park	2.21	2,130	964	828	39.7 years	$38,200
New Zealand					38.1 years	$41,500

For earlier censuses, Te Awamutu was divided into four area units, central, east, south and west, as in this table. Māori formed 19.7% of the population in central, 22.8% in east, 23.2% in south and 25.7% in west.

	Year	Population	Households	Median age	Median income	National median
Te Awamutu total	2001	9,180	3,531			$18,500
Te Awamutu total	2006	9,819	3,828			$24,400
Te Awamutu total	2013	10,308	4,125			$28,500
Central	2001	2,892	1,179	40.5	$16,900	
Central	2006	3,153	1,281	42.1	$21,800	
Central	2013	3,321	1,368	41.6	$26,700	
East	2001	2,301	849	34.9	$17,200	
East	2006	2,511	975	38.9	$23,500	
East	2013	2,769	1,107	42.0	$27,400	
South	2001	2,862	1,098	38.7	$16,800	
South	2006	2,928	1,131	39.8	$21,300	
South	2013	2,913	1,176	41.8	$25,100	
West	2001	1,125	405	33.6	$18,100	
West	2006	1,227	441	35.4	$25,400	
West	2013	1,305	474	36.4	$28,500	

== Facilities and attractions ==
Te Awamutu Museum was established in 1935. The museum has a number of permanent exhibitions focusing on the history of Te Awamutu and the surrounding area.

The museum contains one of the most famous early Māori artefacts, a large carved post known simply as Te Uenuku. This impressive carving has caused much controversy because its style is markedly different from any other early Māori work, yet it is clearly of a Māori design.

Te Awamutu itself is located on SH3, one of the major routes used when touring the North Island of New Zealand.

The town has three large supermarkets, electronics retailers, a well equipped sports / leisure centre and The Kihikihi Trail cycleway, which opened in 2017.

The town has a large dairy factory, and serves as an important centre in the local dairy industry.

== Education ==
Te Awamutu has two state primary schools: Te Awamutu Primary School, with a roll of 590, and Pekapekarau School with a roll of 301. Te Awamutu Primary was founded in 1877. Pekapekarau opened in 1958 as Te Awamutu No 2 School, then was given the name Pekerau School, a misspelling of Pekarau. It changed its name to Pekapekarau School in 2022.

Many of these students then progress on to Te Awamutu Intermediate, established 1959, with a roll of 531, and Te Awamutu College, with a roll of 1,310. Te Awamutu District High School was established in 1921, split between two or more sites. It was replaced by Te Awamutu College in 1947.

There are also three other schools in the town:

- St Patrick's Catholic School is a Year 1–8 state integrated Catholic primary school, with a roll of 243. It was founded in 1921.
- Waipa Christian School is a Year 1–8 state integrated Christian primary school, with a roll of 109. It opened in the early 1990s, and plans to include years 9 and 10 in the future.
- Te Wharekura o Ngā Purapura o te Aroha is a Year 1–15 state school, with a roll of 94 as of July 2026 The school, which teaches in the Māori language, opened in 2007 and moved to its current site in 2020.

All these schools are co-educational. Rolls are as of July 2026.

== Notable residents ==
The town's best known residents are the Finn Brothers, Tim and Neil, whose musical careers have stretched from Split Enz through the internationally successful Crowded House to their current solo and collaborative works. The town is mentioned in Split Enz's song "Haul Away", and also in Crowded House's 1986 song "Mean to Me", the debut single from their self-titled debut album.

Writer Heather Morris, author of The Tattooist of Auschwitz, was born in the town in 1953. She was inducted into the Te Awamutu Walk of Fame in 2019.

Musician Spencer P. Jones (The Beasts of Bourbon, Paul Kelly and The Coloured Girls) was also born in Te Awamutu.

Two Anglican priests of note were the last incumbent vicars of the old St Johns Church. They were The Rev Martin Gloster Sullivan, vicar prior to WW2 who in 1950 became Dean of Christchurch Cathedral and, later Dean of St Paul's Cathedral London, and The Rev John David Hogg who was to become the Anglican Archdeacon of Waikato and Vicar General of the Waikato Diocese.

== See also ==
- Te Awamutu Railway Station
