= Old St John's Church, Te Awamutu =

Historic church in the Waikato region, New Zealand

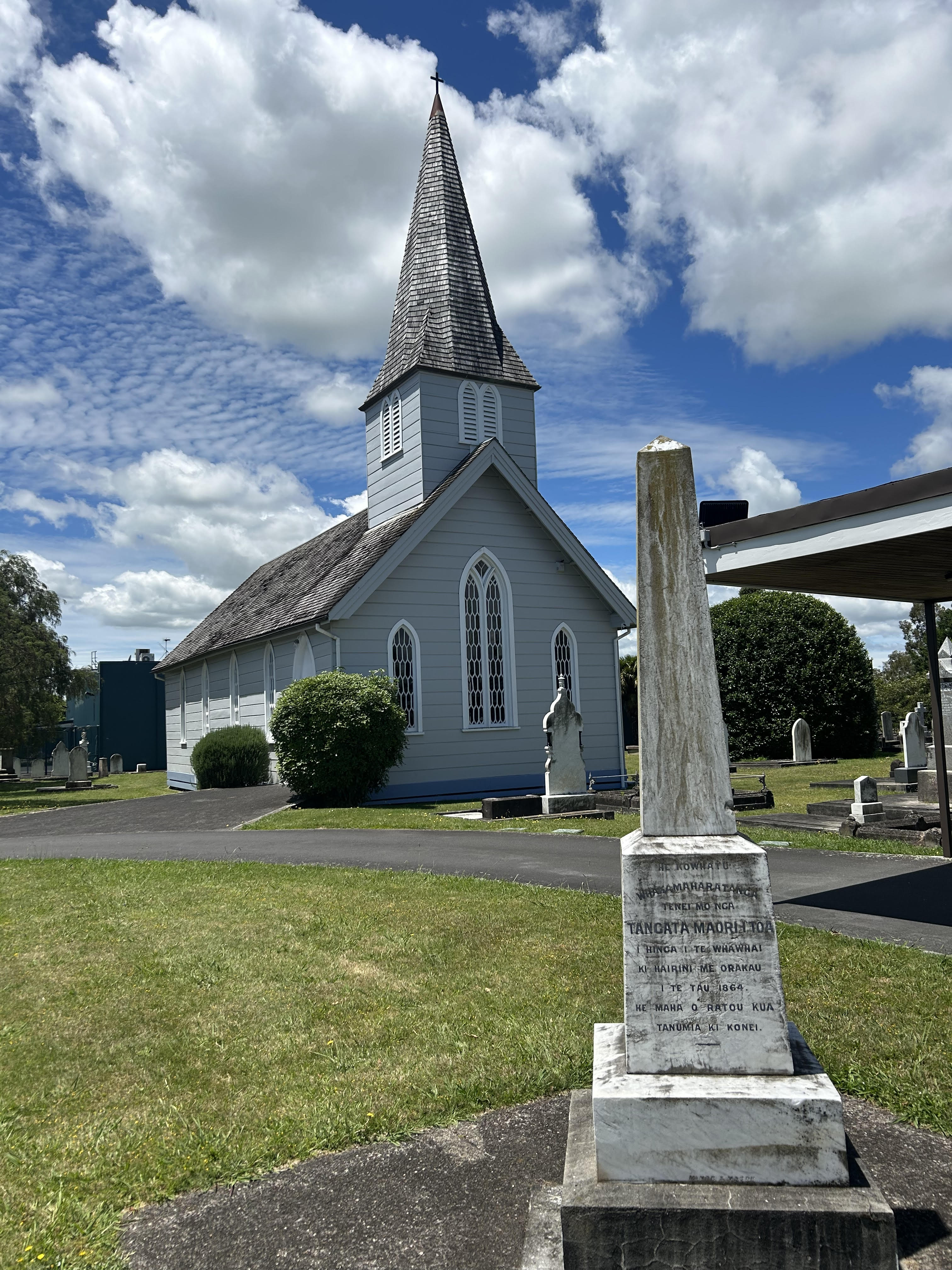
- Old St John's Church, and in the foreground, the 1914 memorial to the Kingite warriors that were killed in the fighting in the area around Te Awamutu during the invasion of the Waikato and are buried in the church's cemetery
- Old St John's Church, Te Awamutu
- 38°00′34.02″S 175°19′40.18″E
- Location: 126 Arawata Street, Te Awamutu
- Country: New Zealand
- Denomination: Anglican

Architecture
- Functional status: Active
- Architect: Reverend John Morgan
- Architectural type: Church
- Style: Gothic Revival
- Years built: 1853–1854

Administration
- Province: Anglican Church in Aotearoa, New Zealand and Polynesia
- Diocese: Waikato and Taranaki
- Parish: St John's Parish, Te Awamutu

Heritage New Zealand – Category 1
- Official name: St John's Church (Anglican)
- Designated: 6 June 1984
- Reference no.: 28

Old St John's Church is a heritage-listed Anglican church in Te Awamutu in the Waikato region of New Zealand. It served as the Anglican church for the now defunct Ōtāwhao mission. Built in the Gothic Revival style, the building was designed by Reverend John Morgan of the Church Missionary Society and constructed in the period 1853–1854. The oldest surviving building in the Waikato region, the church was registered by the New Zealand Historic Places Trust as a Category I building in 1984.

== Background ==
The Church Missionary Society (CMS) had been spreading Christianity among the Māori people of the central Waikato region of New Zealand since the late 1830s. Reverend John Morgan had established a mission in 1841 at Te Awamutu, then known as Ōtāwhao, and in 1849 he sought funds from the CMS headquarters in London to replace the existing chapels, made of raupō, at his mission and that of Rangiaowhia, about 6 kilometres (3.7 mi) to the east, with more formal timber churches. This request, and others submitted by Morgan over the next three years were declined. In the interim, a Catholic church was erected at Rangiaowhia. Morgan used this development to incentivise the CMS, pointing out the advantage that this gave the Catholic Church in the region.

Finally, in 1852, CMS headquarters made £200 available, to be split evenly between both churches. However, the Central Committee of the CMS in New Zealand, which had approval of the usage of the funds, recommended this be put towards the church at Rangiaowhia. This was a disappointment to Morgan who wanted to prioritise the church for Ōtāwhao. He sought a reconsideration of the decision and in March 1853, he finally received permission to proceed with the Ōtāwhao church.

== Construction ==
While awaiting the outcome of his request for a reconsideration of which church to prioritise for construction, Morgan had cleared the site at Ōtāwhao and sourced mataī timber for the building. The wood, about 25,000 feet in total, came from Rangiaowhia and was pit sawn by the local Māori. It was dressed on site at Ōtāwhao mission. The building itself, designed by Morgan in a Gothic Revival style, was built by English carpenters, William Chitham and John Edwards, who worked with Māori labourers.

The church consisted of a nave with dimensions of 55.5 feet (16.9 m) by 26.25 feet (8.00 m) and at its east end, a chancel with dimensions of 15.25 feet (4.65 m) by 11 feet (3.4 m). It has a bell tower, supported by four columns, topped with a steeple. The mataī was used for both the framing and the cladding, the latter shaped as weatherboards. It was roofed with kahikatea timber shingles although these were replaced in 1972. As built, the interior of the building was not lined. However, in September 1864, a lining of rimu timber was installed. At the same time, a vestry was added and extra seating provided to each side of the building.

Arched windows, likely salvaged by Morgan from a chapel at Te Papa Mission Station in Tauranga, were provided. Above the altar, stained glass windows were installed in July 1854, two months after the church began to be used for services. Traditionally, these stained glass windows were stated to have been a gift from Queen Victoria, but in fact were sourced from a church in Auckland. They are likely to be some of the oldest stained glass windows in the country, being made sometime during the period 1850 to 1853. Further stained glass windows, donated by parishioners, replaced conventional windows at the northern end of the nave in the following years.

== History ==
By the time of the construction of St John's, the area around Ōtāwhao was a major source of food crops, with orchards and fields of wheat and corn surrounding it and Rangiaowhia. There was much trade with Auckland. The region soon became a supply centre for the tribes, which supported the Māori King movement, whose followers were known as Kingites. As the movement sought to unify the Māori tribes, this was a threat to the colonial government. Morgan served as an informant, supplying the government with information on the Māori in the area. As tensions between the Kingites and the government increased, Morgan was withdrawn from the mission in March 1863. By this time, he had lost much credibility with the local population who were aware of his activities on behalf of the government. After Morgan's departure, the mission was cared for by Hohaia Ngahiwi, one of its catechists. It also benefited from the patronage of Te Paea Tīaho, the sister of the Māori King Tāwhiao; this ensured that the mission was not sacked by the Kingites.

Then, in July, the British Army mounted an invasion of the Waikato and by the following February, the invasion force was approaching the valuable farming land around Ōtāwhao. On 21 February, the British secured Ōtāwhao, which was largely unoccupied. From then, St John's served as a chapel for the British and militia troops that garrisoned what became known as Te Awamutu; this was easier for the British soldiers to pronounce than Ōtāwhao. Anglican, Presbyterian and Catholic services were held at the church, so it was interdenominational during the time it served as the garrison's chapel.

The surrounding cemetery received several of the dead, both British and Māori, from the fighting in the area. While the graves of two officers are clearly identified with stone markers, the others were provided with wooden markers and over time the locations have been lost. Some of the wooden markers are preserved within the church, as is a memorial tablet honouring the Māori killed at Rangiaowhia and in the Battle of Orakau. This was erected by personnel of the 65th Regiment, part of the garrison in Te Awamutu. Once the military left in 1866, St John's became the parish church for Te Awamutu. The church was initially in the care of a local resident, but in 1874 Reverend L. C. Brady became the parish priest.

In 1965 a new St John's Church was built adjacent the existing church, the latter becoming known as Old St John's Church. With the assistance of the New Zealand Historic Places Trust, the predecessor to Heritage New Zealand, the church underwent a major restoration from the late 1960s to early 1970s, which included replacing the roof and the framing of the bell tower. In 1991 it was discovered that the wooden piles on which the building was sited had deteriorated significantly, to the point it was deemed necessary to close the church for safety reasons. Over the next two years, work on the foundations were carried out and it was reopened in September 1993.

== Legacy ==
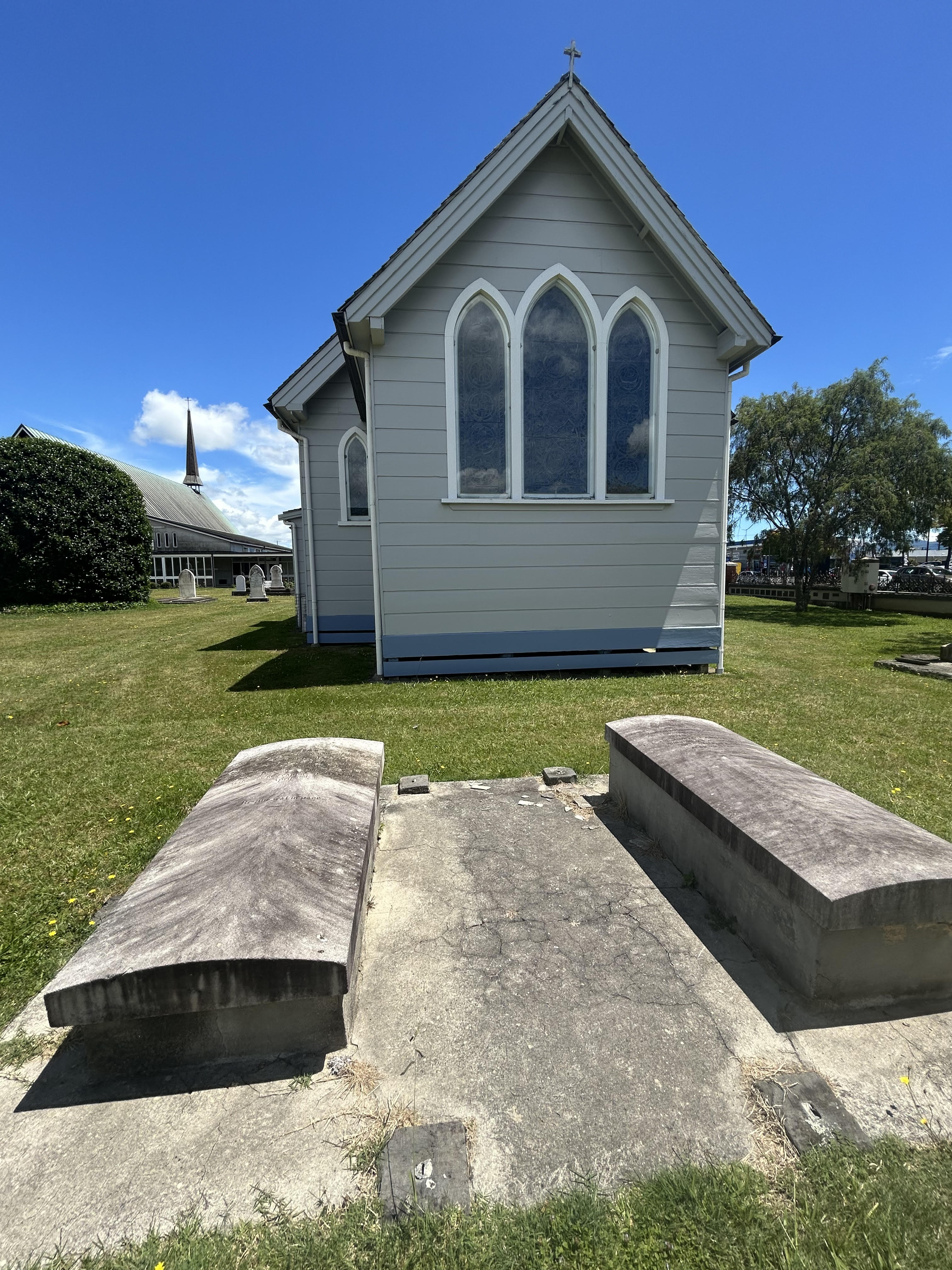
The rear of Old St John's Church; a portion of the newer St John's Church is visible on the left

Listed as a Historic Place Category 1 on 1 June 1984, a factor in the heritage listing of Old St John's Church is the age of the building, which is the oldest in the Waikato, and its connections to the early missionary work of the CMS in the area. Its role in the commemoration of the invasion of the Waikato is also of historical significance; a monument to the British and colonial personnel killed in the fighting was erected in the cemetery in 1888 and several years later, in 1914, a memorial was erected in honour of six Kingite warriors who were buried in the cemetery.

Old St John's Church continues to be used by the Diocese of Waikato and Taranaki as part of the St John's Parish of the Diocese of Waikato and Taranaki.
