= Les Martres-de-Veyre =

- Commune
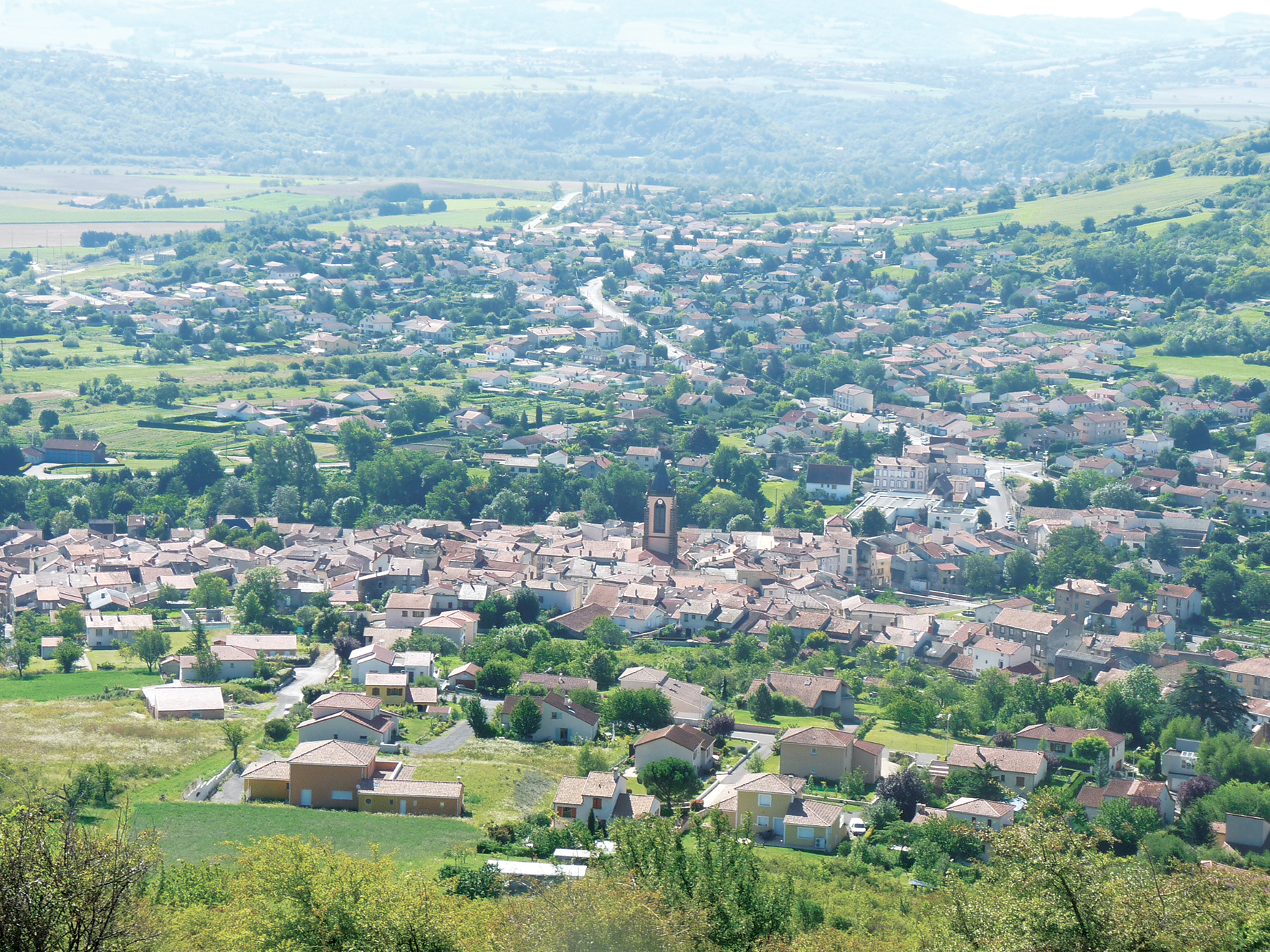
- A general view of Les Martres-de-Veyre

- Coat of arms
- Location of Les Martres-de-Veyre
- Location within France Location within Auvergne-Rhône-Alpes
- Coordinates: 45°41′06″N 3°11′26″E
- Country: France
- Region: Auvergne-Rhône-Alpes
- Department: Puy-de-Dôme
- Arrondissement: Clermont-Ferrand
- Canton: Les Martres-de-Veyre
- Intercommunality: Mond'Arverne Communauté

Government
  - Mayor (2020–2026): Pascal Pigot
- Area^{1}: 9.28 km^{2} (3.58 sq mi)
- Elevation: 346 m (1,135 ft)
- Highest elevation: 500 m (1,600 ft)
- Lowest elevation: 323 m (1,060 ft)
- Population (2023): 3,826
  - Density: 412/km^{2} (1,070/sq mi)
- Time zone: UTC+01:00 (CET)
  - Summer (DST): UTC+02:00 (CEST)
- INSEE/Postal code: 63214 /63730
- ^{1} French Land Register data, which excludes lakes, ponds, glaciers > 1 km^{2} (0.386 sq mi or 247 acres) and river estuaries.

Les Martres-de-Veyre (French pronunciation: [le maʁtʁ də vɛʁ], literally Les Martres of Veyre; Occitan: Las Martras) is a commune in the Puy-de-Dôme department in Auvergne in central France.

== Population ==
Historical population
Year	Pop.	±% p.a.
1968	2,293	—
1975	2,633	+1.99%
1982	2,615	−0.10%
1990	3,151	+2.36%
1999	3,914	+2.44%
2007	3,956	+0.13%
2012	3,921	−0.18%
2017	3,976	+0.28%
2023	3,826	−0.64%
Source: INSEE

== See also ==
- Communes of the Puy-de-Dôme department
