= Veyre-Monton =

- Commune
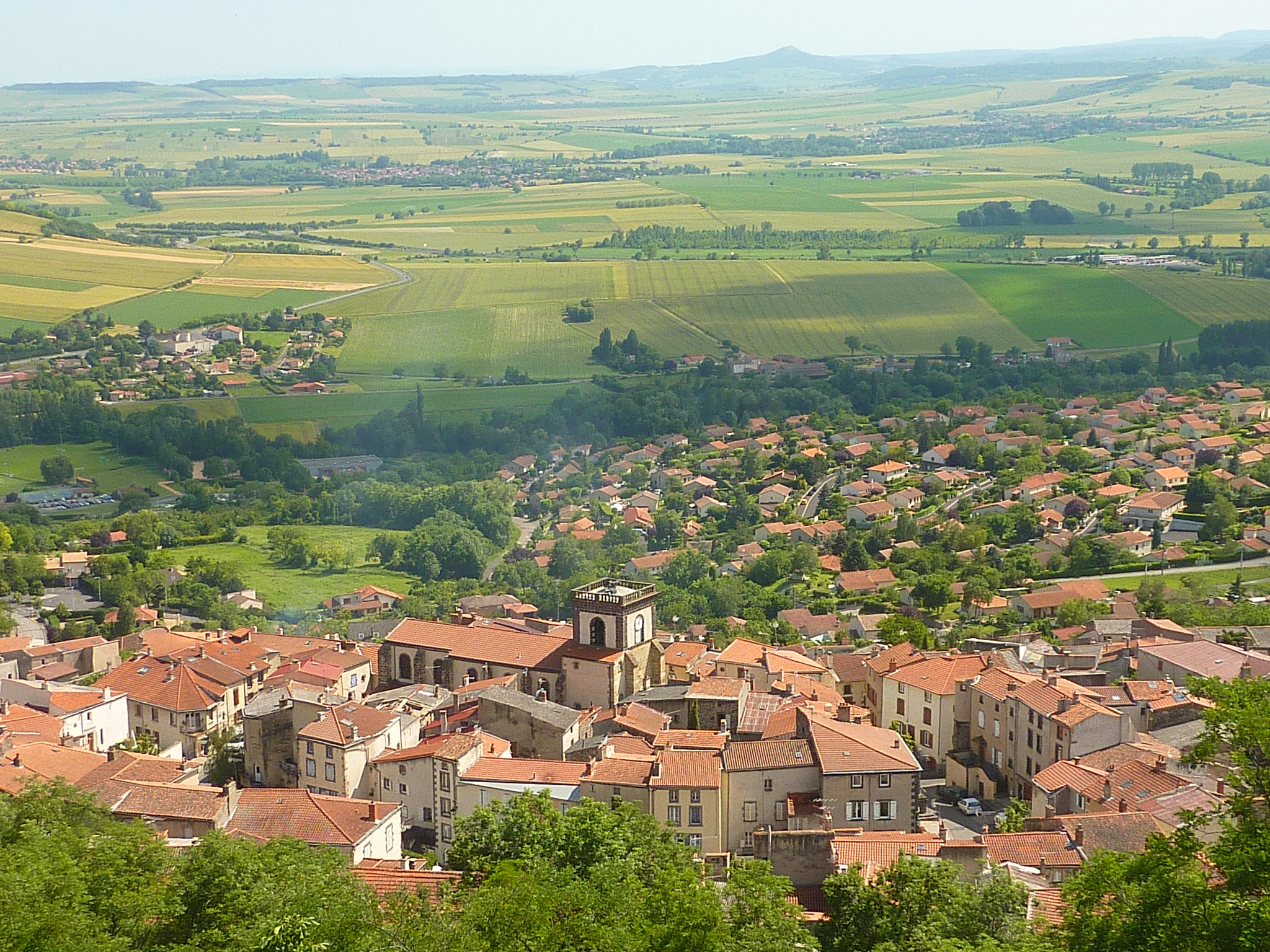
- A general view of Veyre-Monton

- Coat of arms
- Location of Veyre-Monton
- Location within France Location within Auvergne-Rhône-Alpes
- Coordinates: 45°40′37″N 3°09′29″E
- Country: France
- Region: Auvergne-Rhône-Alpes
- Department: Puy-de-Dôme
- Arrondissement: Clermont-Ferrand
- Canton: Les Martres-de-Veyre
- Intercommunality: Mond'Arverne Communauté

Government
  - Mayor (2020–2026): Gilles Pétel
- Area^{1}: 12.11 km^{2} (4.68 sq mi)
- Elevation: 450 m (1,480 ft)
- Highest elevation: 621 m (2,037 ft)
- Lowest elevation: 347 m (1,138 ft)
- Population (2023): 3,721
  - Density: 307.3/km^{2} (795.8/sq mi)
- Time zone: UTC+01:00 (CET)
  - Summer (DST): UTC+02:00 (CEST)
- INSEE/Postal code: 63455 /63960
- ^{1} French Land Register data, which excludes lakes, ponds, glaciers > 1 km^{2} (0.386 sq mi or 247 acres) and river estuaries.

Veyre-Monton (French pronunciation: [vɛʁ mɔ̃tɔ̃]; Occitan: Vaira e Monton) is a commune in the Puy-de-Dôme department in Auvergne in central France.

== Population ==
Historical population
Year	Pop.	±% p.a.
1968	1,187	—
1975	1,652	+4.84%
1982	2,572	+6.53%
1990	3,381	+3.48%
1999	3,443	+0.20%
2007	3,335	−0.40%
2012	3,464	+0.76%
2017	3,542	+0.45%
2023	3,721	+0.83%
Source: INSEE

== See also ==
- Communes of the Puy-de-Dôme department
