= Chanonat =

- Commune
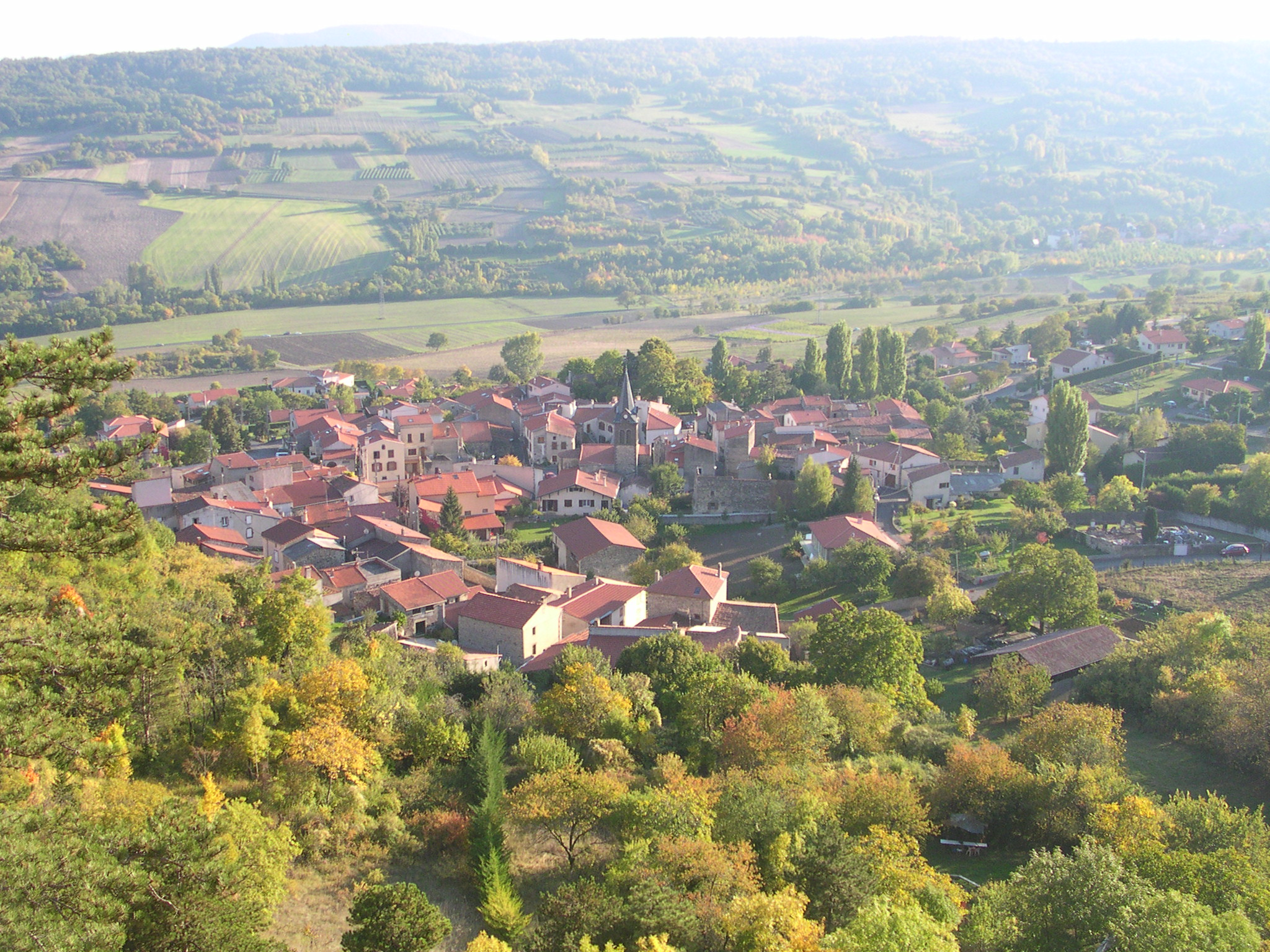
- Jussat

- Coat of arms
- Location of Chanonat
- Location within France Location within Auvergne-Rhône-Alpes
- Coordinates: 45°41′42″N 3°05′46″E
- Country: France
- Region: Auvergne-Rhône-Alpes
- Department: Puy-de-Dôme
- Arrondissement: Clermont-Ferrand
- Canton: Les Martres-de-Veyre
- Intercommunality: Mond'Arverne Communauté

Government
  - Mayor (2026–32): Julien Brunhes
- Area^{1}: 12.70 km^{2} (4.90 sq mi)
- Elevation: 510 m (1,670 ft)
- Highest elevation: 800 m (2,600 ft)
- Lowest elevation: 450 m (1,480 ft)
- Population (2023): 1,729
  - Density: 136.1/km^{2} (352.6/sq mi)
- Time zone: UTC+01:00 (CET)
  - Summer (DST): UTC+02:00 (CEST)
- INSEE/Postal code: 63084 /63450
- Website: chanonat.fr
- ^{1} French Land Register data, which excludes lakes, ponds, glaciers > 1 km^{2} (0.386 sq mi or 247 acres) and river estuaries.

Chanonat (French pronunciation: [ʃanɔna]) is a commune in the Puy-de-Dôme department in Auvergne-Rhône-Alpes in central France.

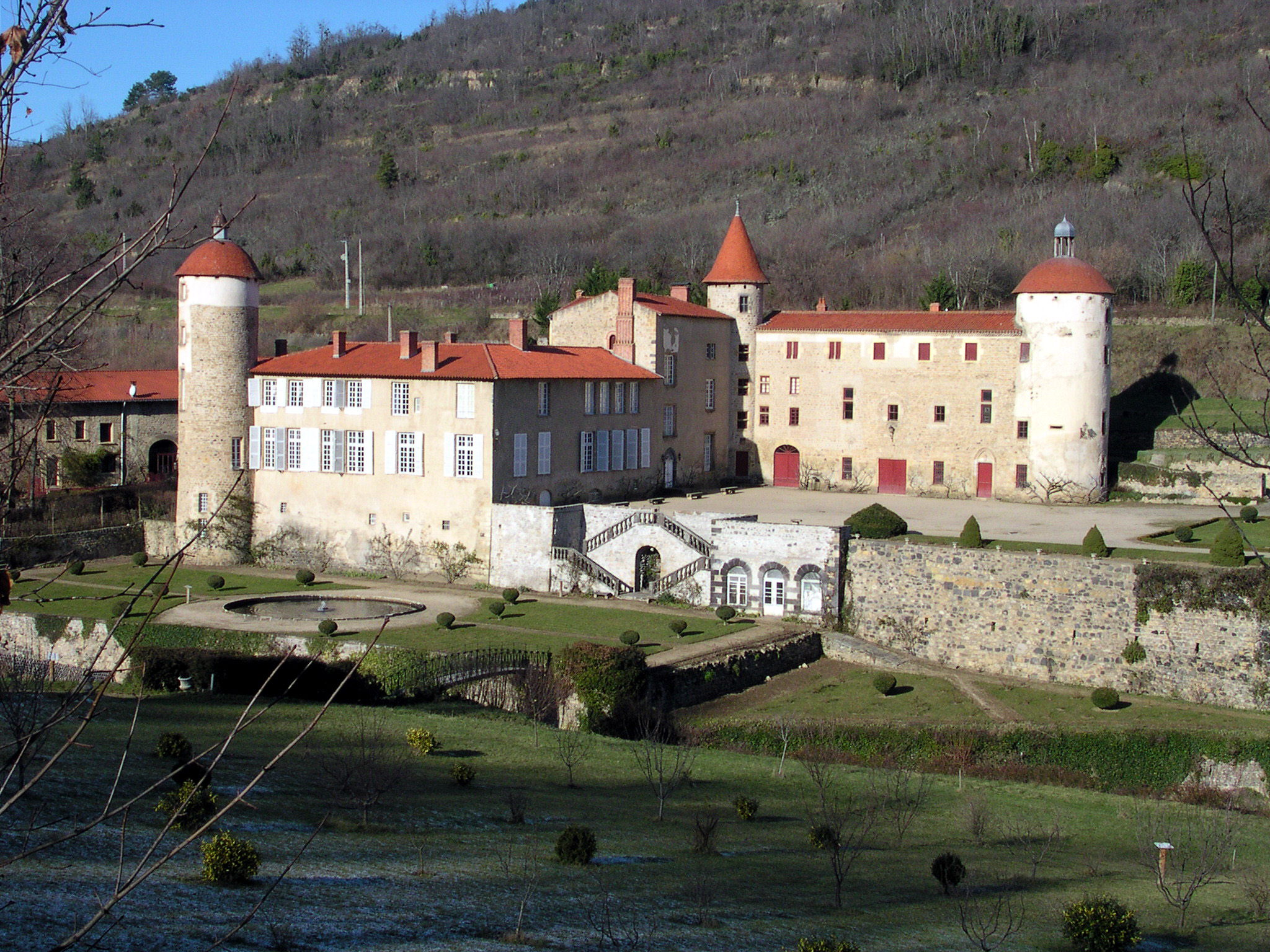
La Batisse castle near Chanonat

== See also ==
- Communes of the Puy-de-Dôme department
